= Greystaines =

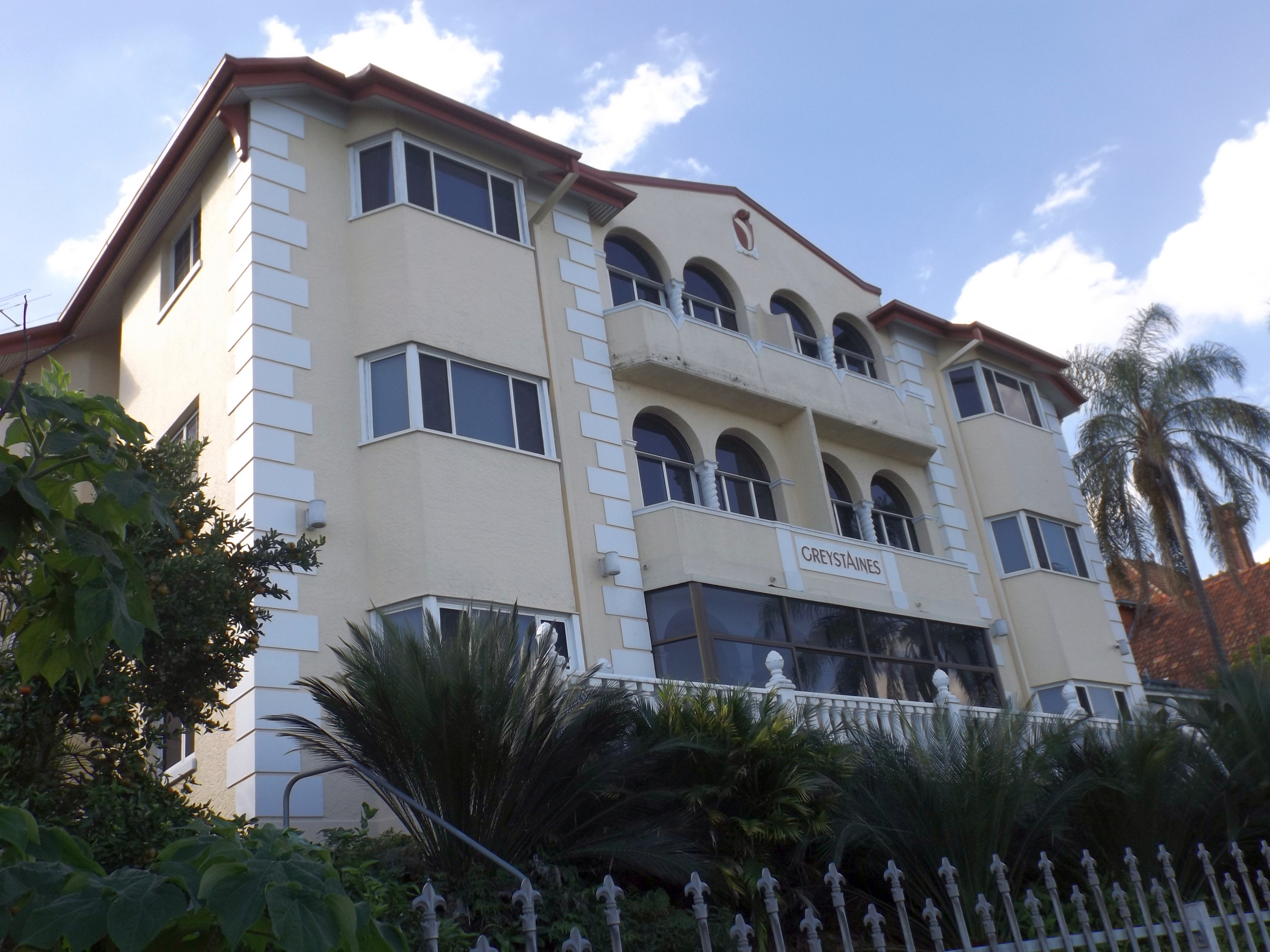
- Building in 2015

- Location within Queensland Location within Australia
- 27.4389°S 153.0546°E
- Location: 240 Kingsford Smith Drive, Hamilton, City of Brisbane, Queensland, Australia

History
- Design period: 1919–1930s (interwar period)
- Built: 1934–

Site notes
- Architect: George Ray
- Architectural style: Mediterranean

Queensland Heritage Register
- Official name: Greystaines, Greystaines Flats
- Type: state heritage (built)
- Designated: 26 May 2006
- Reference no.: 602551
- Significant period: 1934–present
- Significant components: residential accommodation – flat/s
- Builders: Douglas Francis Roberts

Greystaines is a heritage-listed 8 bedroom, 6 bathroom, 3 kitchen house with 6 car garage (previously an apartment block) at 240 Kingsford Smith Drive, Hamilton, City of Brisbane, Queensland, Australia. A substantial, three-storeyed building, it was designed by George Rae, a Brisbane-based architect who designed some of Brisbane's best interwar buildings, and built from 1934 onwards by Douglas Francis Roberts for Mr Sydney James Dove and his wife Audree Thomasina Dove. It was also known as Greystaines Flats. It was added to the Queensland Heritage Register on 26 May 2006.

== History ==
The land where Greystaines was built, along the southern slope of Hamilton Hill overlooking the Brisbane River and with frontage to the road along the river leading to Eagle Farm was first proclaimed for sale in September 1853. Allotments 6 to 9 of portion 1 (totalling just under 32 acres (13 ha)) were acquired by William Robert Howe Weekes. In 1857 access to the area was improved by the construction of a bridge over Breakfast Creek near the confluence with the Brisbane River. From the early 1860s many of the Hamilton allotments were subdivided into smaller parcels, attracting a number of prominent middle-class residents who built comfortable homes on the slopes of Hamilton (later Toorak) and Hemmant (later Eldernell) hills, overlooking the river. Weekes subdivided his land about 1865, creating much of today's pattern of subdivision and roads in the area, including Hillside Crescent, Eden Lane, Crescent Road (originally Weekes Street) and Arran Avenue (originally Robert Street). On the long strip of land at the foot of Hamilton Hill bounded by Hillside Crescent, Eden Lane and Crescent, Hamilton and Toorak roads, two substantial homes had been erected by 1883. "Braesid" occupied the western third of the site and "Norwood", the home of Brisbane dentist David Eden from the late 1870s, occupied the eastern two-thirds. The later site of Greystaines formed part of the Norwood Estate.

By the mid-1890s a house extant to the east of Norwood, still within the Norwood estate appears to have occupied the later site of Greystaines. In 1906, Eden resurveyed the Norwood estate and sold off the eastern half, with boundaries to Eden's Lane, Hamilton Road and Crescent Road, in two parcels. The site of the flats was transferred to George Longland who occupied a residence at this location from at least 1908. An aerial photograph dated c. 1925 shows a large house on the site.

Longland transferred his interest in this property to Jessie Jane Buchanan, as trustee, in 1918 and she transferred the property to Alan Gordon Corrie in 1923. Following Corrie's death in 1925, the property was transferred in late 1928 early 1929 to Sydney James Dove and his wife Audree Thomasina Dove, as joint tenants. In 1934 Mr and Mrs Dove commissioned Brisbane architect George Rae to design a modern block of six brick flats for the site.

The site was well chosen for the construction of apartments, offering a number of attractions to potential tenants. The position was high, with extensive views overlooking the Brisbane River and adjacent suburbs; the tram service along Hamilton Road (later Kingsford Smith Drive) provided regular, reliable access to the Brisbane central business district and to inner city attractions such as theatres and restaurants. Two street frontages made for greater convenience of access. Given this prime location in one of Brisbane's premier residential suburbs, the site warranted a substantial, well-designed building that offered apartments of a comfortable size and convenience attracting middle class occupants who could afford a comparatively higher rent.

At the time, George Rae was in his early thirties and one of Brisbane's most successful young architects. He had just established his own architectural practice in Brisbane (1933) after working in partnership in this city as Atkinson, Powell and Conrad 1927–31 and Lange L Powell and George Rae 1931–33, both among the most prominent architectural firms of the day. His more substantial purpose-designed apartment buildings are amongst the most important of their type and their period in Brisbane and include: Carrington (corner of Warry Street and Gregory Terrace, Spring Hill) erected in 1933; Highview (on Dornoch Terrace, Highgate Hill) designed in 1933–34; Casa del Mar (44 Moray Street, New Farm) erected in 1934 and Green Gables (Julius Street Flats New Farm) (corner of Julius and Moray streets, New Farm) erected in 1935.

By April 1934 Rae had completed the design Greystaines and was calling tenders for the construction. In mid-1934 the contract was let to well-known Brisbane master builder Douglas Francis Roberts, who resided nearby at Albion. When Brisbane City Council building approval was obtained early in June 1934, the flats were priced at £4,000. This represented a substantial investment for a Brisbane apartment building, where most of the better class of brick or concrete apartment buildings of this period cost between $3,000 and $6,000 to construct (exclusive land costs).

In mid-1934 Mr and Mrs Dove took out a mortgage on their Hamilton Road property. This possibly financed the construction of Greystaines.

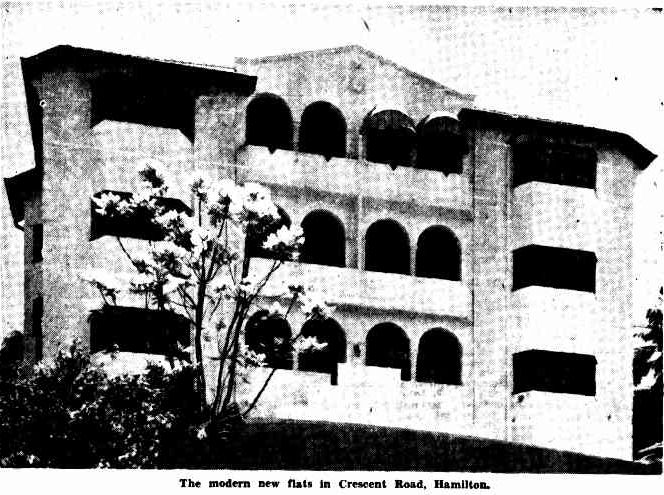
Greystaines, 1934

Early in November 1934 the Courier-Mail reported that Greystaines had been completed and published a photograph of the new building. The design was considered very modern and "a Colonial adaptation of Mediterranean architectural style". The apartments were of a comfortable size, well appointed and finished; clearly intended for middle-class tenants.

The building’s roofs were mottled tiles. When apartments, they had separate garages, two bedrooms, lounge, living room, laundry, kitchen, bathroom and balconies front and back. The interior wall decorations were wallpaper, the bathrooms tiled.

Greystaines was erected during a revival of an apartment building "boom" in Brisbane in the interwar period, curtailed by the severe economic depression of the early 1930s. With the easing of the depression the construction of purpose-built flats led a recovery in Brisbane residential construction from 1933. In 1933–34 apartment buildings reputedly were returning up to 8–12% on capital and were one of the most attractive small investments of the day.

Greystaines, constructed in 1934, was one of the first of the larger blocks of residential flats erected in this suburb. In the second half of the 1930s Hamilton became a popular venue for purpose-built apartment construction, rivalling New Farm. Many larger blocks of flats along the southern slopes of Hamilton, Toorak and Eldernell hills from the period 1934–41 survive.

In the 1930s with no provision for strata title of property, the construction of apartment buildings tended to be a long-term investment for developers, rather than a speculative venture aimed at rapid on-selling. Mr and Mrs Dove retained ownership of Greystaines Flats until the property was transferred to Guy Dart Atherton in July 1941. Ownership changed again in 1950, when sold to Thomas Keith Watson Muir or £15,000, who retained the property for nearly 30 years.

Around 1950 part of the frontage of the building was resumed to allow widening of the road. It changed hands in 2005 for $2,550,00 and was converted into a single dwelling.

== Description ==
Greystaines is situated on the south east slope of Toorak or Hamilton Hill, fronting Kingsford Smith Drive. It has views of the Brisbane River and across Bulimba, Newstead and the City centre. It had a multi-hipped roof of terracotta tiles. The central bay in the front elevation had a wide gable, below which, on each level, was arcaded verandas with barley twist columns supporting the arches opening onto exposed balconies with balustrades. Either side of the central front bay there were projecting bays with bay windows. Detailing was spare and well executed. Cornices were plain, skirtings simple. There was a wide plate rail in the halls. Doors had full height vertical recessed panels and the drawing rooms on the upper floors had wide doors with multiple rectangular panes of glass set in narrow cames. The building makes a strong aesthetic contribution to the streetscape along Kingsford Smith Drive and is prominent when viewed from the Hamilton Reach of the Brisbane River.
