= Lochiel, Hamilton =

Heritage-listed villa in Australia

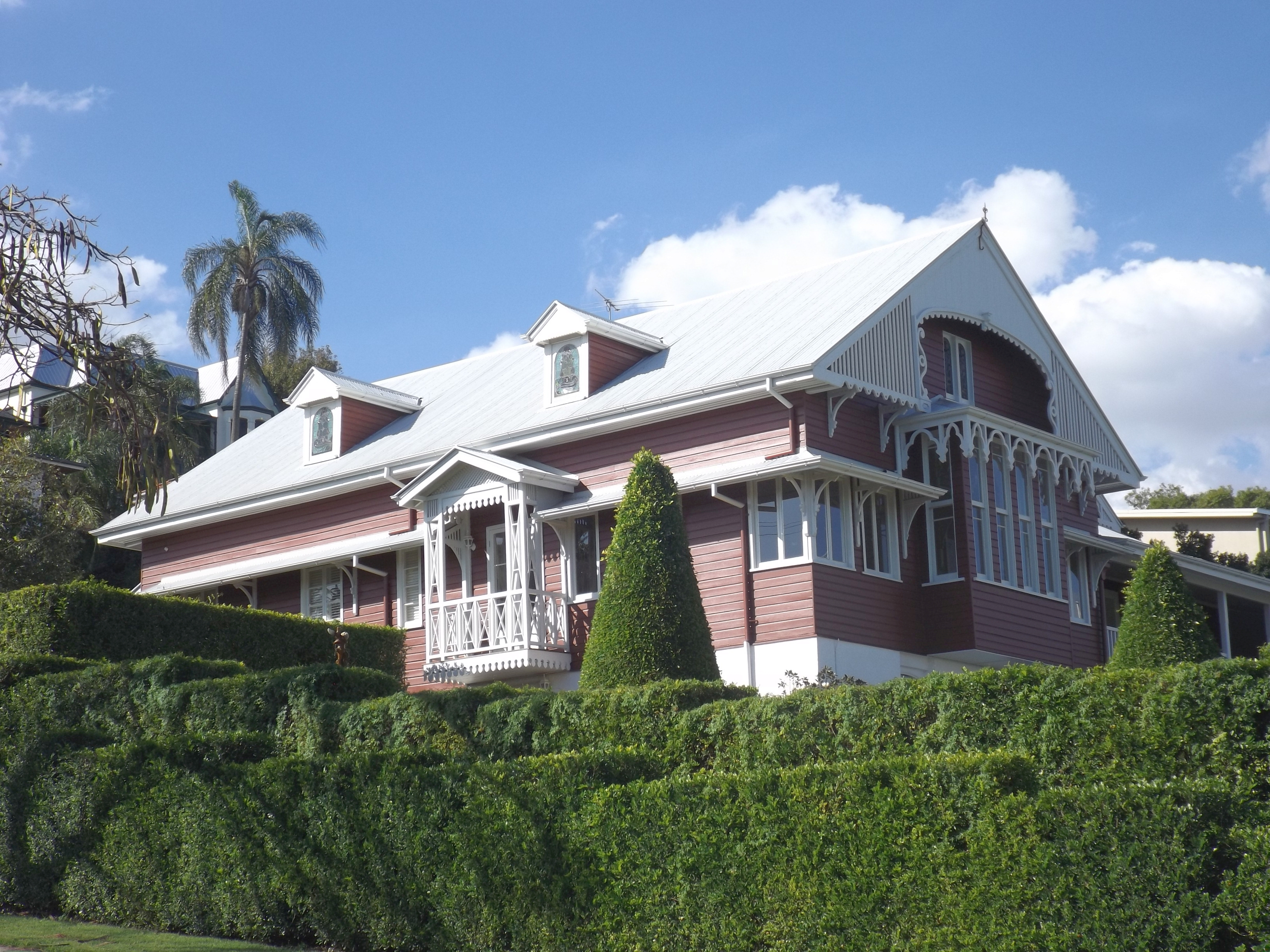
- View from Toorak Road, 2015

- Location within Queensland Location within Australia
- 27.4387°S 153.0515°E
- Location: 6 Hillside Crescent, Hamilton, City of Brisbane, Queensland, Australia

History
- Design period: 1840s–1860s (mid-19th century)
- Built: 1860s–1920s

Queensland Heritage Register
- Official name: Lochiel, Balmoral?, Langley Grove?, Runnymeade
- Type: state heritage (landscape, built)
- Designated: 28 May 1999
- Reference no.: 601965
- Significant period: 1860s–1920s (fabric, historical)
- Significant components: extension/s or addition/s, stables, garden edging/balustrades/planter boxes, wall/s – retaining, trees/plantings, gate – entrance, lawn/s, basement / sub-floor, garage, terracing, shed – storage, views from, garden/grounds, residential accommodation – main house

Lochiel is a heritage-listed villa at 6 Hillside Crescent, Hamilton, City of Brisbane, Queensland, Australia. It was built from 1860s to 1920s. It is also known as Balmoral, Langley Grove, and Runnymeade. It was added to the Queensland Heritage Register on 28 May 1999.

== History ==
Lochiel comprises a substantial timber and masonry residence together with associated outbuildings (the former stables, shed, and lych gate) set within substantial grounds on the lower reaches of Toorak Hill overlooking the Hamilton Reach of the Brisbane River. The house has evolved over several stages: its genesis is believed to be a two-story masonry house erected by John Francis Buckland in the 1860s. After the house was purchased by John Samuel Cameron (the younger) in 1899 two timber additions were undertaken: a museum wing by 1906 and a first floor addition over the eastern wing by 1927. The layout of the garden is also believed to date from Cameron's ownership. Lochiel remains in the ownership of the Cameron family; the house having been converted into flats after World War II. This history is based entirely on publicly held records. It is believed that further information is held by the Cameron family, which may well contribute further to its understanding.

The land on which Lochiel stands forms part of an original deed of grant of 5 acres (2.0 ha) (described as allotment 5 of portion 1) made in April 1855 to John James Perry and William Anthony Brown both of Brisbane. It is not known whether the land was occupied at this time, however Nehemiah Bartley writing in 1854 describes a foot track over Toorak Hill (then called Gage's Hill) to German Station at Nundah so avoiding the longer route by the river bank. Prior to 1845 squatting licences were known to have been granted in this vicinity (including to Gage who cleared land, and planted maize and vegetables). On the other side of Breakfast Creek, just three years after the declaration of free settlement and the first Brisbane land sales, land was offered for sale including the Newstead House, Brisbane parcel (house erected 1845/6).

The value of the Breakfast Creek / Hamilton district had been recognised from the earliest settlement of Brisbane. In 1824, prior to the resiting of the Moreton Bay penal colony from Redcliffe to Brisbane, it was Breakfast Creek which was nominated by Governor Brisbane and John Oxley as a more suitable place for settlement with the rocky point now known as Cameron Rocks identified as having good anchorage and a natural wharf. The first known settlement in the district however came with the establishment in 1829 of Eagle Farm as an annexe to the penal colony. The construction of the Eagle Farm Road by convicts (later also called Breakfast Creek Road and Hamilton Road, now Kingsford Smith Drive) and a bridge across Breakfast Creek later providing impetus for the early development of the area.

In 1865 allotment 5 was transferred to Peter Nicol Russell described on the title as of London but according to electoral records resident at New Farm. In the same year this was subdivided into 15 lots. An 1864 advertisement for sale of nearby lands describes the area along the Eagle Farm Road as "at all times the most favourite direction for suburban residence, it has of late been even more enquired after for similar purposes ... Very great improvements have attended the progress of this locality during the last twelve months".

According to title's information, on 21 September 1867 (but possibly some two years earlier), three of the subdivided parcels of allotment 5 (subs 11, 12, and 13) containing 2 roods 16 perches (2,400 m^{2}) were transferred to Ellen Gertrude Buckland. EG Buckland (?–1911) was the wife of John Francis Buckland (1832–1910). JF Buckland arrived in Queensland in 1862 from England establishing an auctioneering partnership with Simon Fraser (Fraser & Buckland 1863–1873); later in business on his own account as an auctioneer and broker. He was an original member of the Nundah Divisional Board (created 1880/1) until 1883 when he became the first Chairman of the new Toombul Divisional Board of which he remained a member until the late 1880s when, with the creation of the new Hamilton Divisional Board, he no longer resided within the boundaries of Toombul. From 1882 to 1892 he was the Member of the Queensland Legislative Assembly for Bulimba.

The first Post Office Directories (1868) record Buckland as residing at Breakfast Creek (which the area was known as). Based on a combination of the Post Office Directories and photographic evidence, it is the Bucklands who are believed to have erected what was to become the first stage of Lochiel. A photograph dated 1868 shows the house at this stage believed to have comprised 2 rooms upstairs with kitchen area below fronting what is now known as Hillside Crescent. No architect or builder has to date been identified although in 1864 Brisbane architect WH Chambers erected the Queen Street premises of Fraser and Buckland. During the Buckland's residency the house appears to have been known firstly as Balmoral Cottage and from 1885 to 1886 as Runnymeade.

The Bucklands' Toorak Hill neighbours at this time included several substantial residences: James Dickson's "Toorak" (Toorak House) erected c. 1865, "Eldernell" (1869), "Waterview" (later 'Camden House'; demolished), and "Mt Pleasant" (on the western side of Toorak Rd).

In 1889 a further 2 roods 16 perches (2,400 m^{2}) was added to the Runnymeade holding with resubs 11–16 of subs 6, 7, and 8 (with frontage to Dickson Terrace) being acquired again in the name of Ellen Gertrude Buckland. (This land is no longer part of the Lochiel holding and does not form part of the entry in the Heritage Register). A photograph dating from this time shows Runneymede as a masonry house in cottage orne style comprising a simple gabled front section with verandahs facing south and a gabled brick wing to the northeast, which has apparently been added by this time. The house and extension have distinctive bargeboards with wavy edges. The photograph also shows a roof in the location of the existing small shed located to the east of the house and a mature garden. In the same year the Bucklands acquired a near neighbour to the east when Kate Quinlan erected "Maria Ville" (later called 'Eltham').

In 1892, Buckland became insolvent although according to the Post Office Directories he remained at Runnymeade until the mid-1890s. From 1895 to 1897 the house is listed as vacant, but was apparently occupied for a short time thereafter by Fred Lawson (of Lawson and Johnson fancy goods dealers) and renamed Langley Grove.

In 1899 the property was transferred by the mortgagee to John Samuel Cameron who renamed the house Lochiel. Cameron (1868–1917), son of John Samuel Cameron (1834–1902) and Frances Spencer Cameron was a partner in the Brisbane auctioneering firm established by his father, (John Cameron & Sons, which remains a family firm). JS Cameron Snr and his family are believed to have resided nearby to Lochiel (then Runnymeade) in the 1880s at Greenbank. In 1884 the family moved to Doowabah at Ormiston. In a manuscript held by the John Oxley Library, one of John Samuel Cameron's three sisters recalls that the Camerons were very keen gardeners, and with the help of John Neish, the Scottish gardener Captain Hope of Ormiston House Estate had brought out with him, we soon had a wonderful flower and fruit garden which was greatly helped by the many sharks that were buried for fertilising purposes.

In 1900 John Cameron jnr married Etty Florence Griffiths Higgins. The Lochiel household also included Marian Griffiths Higgins (later Brown; Etty's daughter from her first marriage to Ernest Higgins) and two sons John Griffiths Cameron (born 1903) and Stuart Francis Griffiths Cameron (b1904). Photographs show the house and grounds prior to the erection of the museum c. 1906. The studio photographs which appear to be contemporaneous are taken from the south east and north east. They show the house prior to the enclosing of the verandahs as well as a good view of the eastern wing of the house (including a small separately roofed timber addition) prior to the addition of the upper story. The roofed area to the rear of the house is also shown. Garden structures including post and rail fences, trellises and a small building on the eastern boundary are visible.

According to his sister Cameron was a keen collector, when young of Shells and Birds' Eggs and Native Weapons of all sorts but later became very interested in good China and Glass, particularly Bohemian and Venetian Glass, and his large collection contained many very beautiful specimens. Apparently to house his collection, by 1906, Cameron had added the museum to the western side of the house.

Built of timber, the museum interior is shown in photographs as having decorative tie beams and hangers, high level windows, and a striped timber floor. The collection appears to have been highly personal and eclectic with aboriginal artefacts, oriental furniture, porcelain paintings, and sculptures filling the space. The purpose built museum is believed to be rare. To date only one other purpose built private museum has been identified: at "Beaufort Hill" Clayfield where in the 1920s Edward Hawkins had a museum room incorporated as part of a tower addition to an existing house.

By 1906 the lychgate at the corner of Toorak Road and Hillside Crescent had also been erected. By this time Hamilton was well established as a suburb of Brisbane. In 1899 the electric tram service to Ascot commenced; subdivisions continued including that of the nearby Toorak Estate (following the death of James Dixon in 1901); in 1904 the town of Hamilton succeeded the Shire of Hamilton as the local authority area; and "the Rocky Wharf" (later called Cameron Rocks apparently in honour of JS Cameron), once described as the perfect landing place for a fledgling penal colony, was now a place for couples to "spoon" away the evening hours. A contemporary newspaper article describes the Hamilton township:

"The mansions and villas of many of Brisbane's commercial men crown every green knoll, inviting the cool breezes of the eastern ocean ... Hamilton Road is a well-kept thoroughfare, and provides a much frequented drive, whilst the electric tramcars which traverse it are invariably filled on summer afternoons and evenings ... At the present time there are about 5,000 souls resident in Hamilton."

In 1916 Cameron appointed his brothers Waverley Fletcher Cameron, Stuart William Cameron, and his wife Etty Florence Cameron as trustees. They remained as trustees administering his estate after his death in the following year on 26 April 1917. Under the terms of Cameron's will, his wife continued to reside at Lochiel (including the enjoyment of the museum) until her death in August 1945 when Lochiel passed to their two sons.

The Brisbane City Council Sewerage Detail Plan records that by 1927 an upper story had been added to Lochiel positioned over the early brick eastern wing, although based on photographic evidence this may have been as early as 1912. An undated photograph shows Lochiel after this addition which was detailed to match the museum wing. To date it has not been possible to identify who was responsible for this work. Based on drawings prepared by architects Job & Collins c. 1945 the upper floor was accessed by an internal stairwell from the existing eastern wing of the house.

The 1927 sewerage plan shows Lochiel much as it is today although at this time the land holding still extended through to Dickson Terrace. The plan shows the small shed, garages (believed to be former stables) to the north west of the site, lychgate, and several other unidentified structures. In the 1930s half of the land holding (fronting Dickson Terrace) was reconfigured into three blocks – subs 1 and 2 with frontage to Dickson Terrace; sub 3 with a narrow frontage to Toorak Road. None of these blocks were sold but remained (as required by Cameron's will) as part of the administered estate of John Samuel Cameron although sub 1 was leased from 1936 to one of the Cameron sons, John Griffiths Cameron. A house may have been erected on this site at this time.

Following the death of Etty Florence Cameron in 1945, her two sons inherited the property as provided for under their father's will. At this time the contents of the museum were apparently dispersed and architects Job & Collins prepared drawings for the conversion of the house into flats. One drawing also shows the pre-flat layout of the ground floor: the early masonry core of the house contains the dining room and a bedroom; the eastern wing, a bedroom, stairwell to upper level, maid's room (in the timber portion), and bathroom on the verandah; to the rear of the house is the living room with stairs to basement level marked; kitchen, scullery, and associated service rooms to the west of the living room; the museum is shown with several entrances marked to other parts of the house. It is not known what use if any was made of the basement rooms (which in addition to the original kitchen rooms also includes a room under the museum). The second drawing documents the conversion of the house into the 6 existing flats.

From 1947, the two Dickson Terrace blocks are separated from the main house block subs 11,12, and 13 and sub 3 (containing the house Lochiel) – each son acquiring a block with the house block being held in joint ownership. After the death of Stuart Cameron in 1972, the whole of what is now considered the Lochiel house block is acquired by John Griffiths Cameron. Lochiel was acquired by the present owners following the death of their father in 1976. A 1997 application for demolition which was refused by the Brisbane City Council attracted a considerable number of objections. Lochiel remains on the market. A feasibility study for its reuse commissioned on behalf of the Queensland Heritage Council in 1998 has identified several potential uses.

In 2001, Michelle Kleist restored the mansion in 2001 but argued with the Queensland Heritage Council over a number of aspects of the restoration, including its colour. She followed the directions of the Council and later said she was happy with that outcome.

In June 2006, the real estate information service RPD bought Lochiel for $6.4 million. In October 2010, the company and its founder Raymond David Catelan were fined $250,000 and $100,000 respectively for conducting unauthorised building work on Lochiel, involving the removal of walls and foundations and widening the cellar.

== Description ==
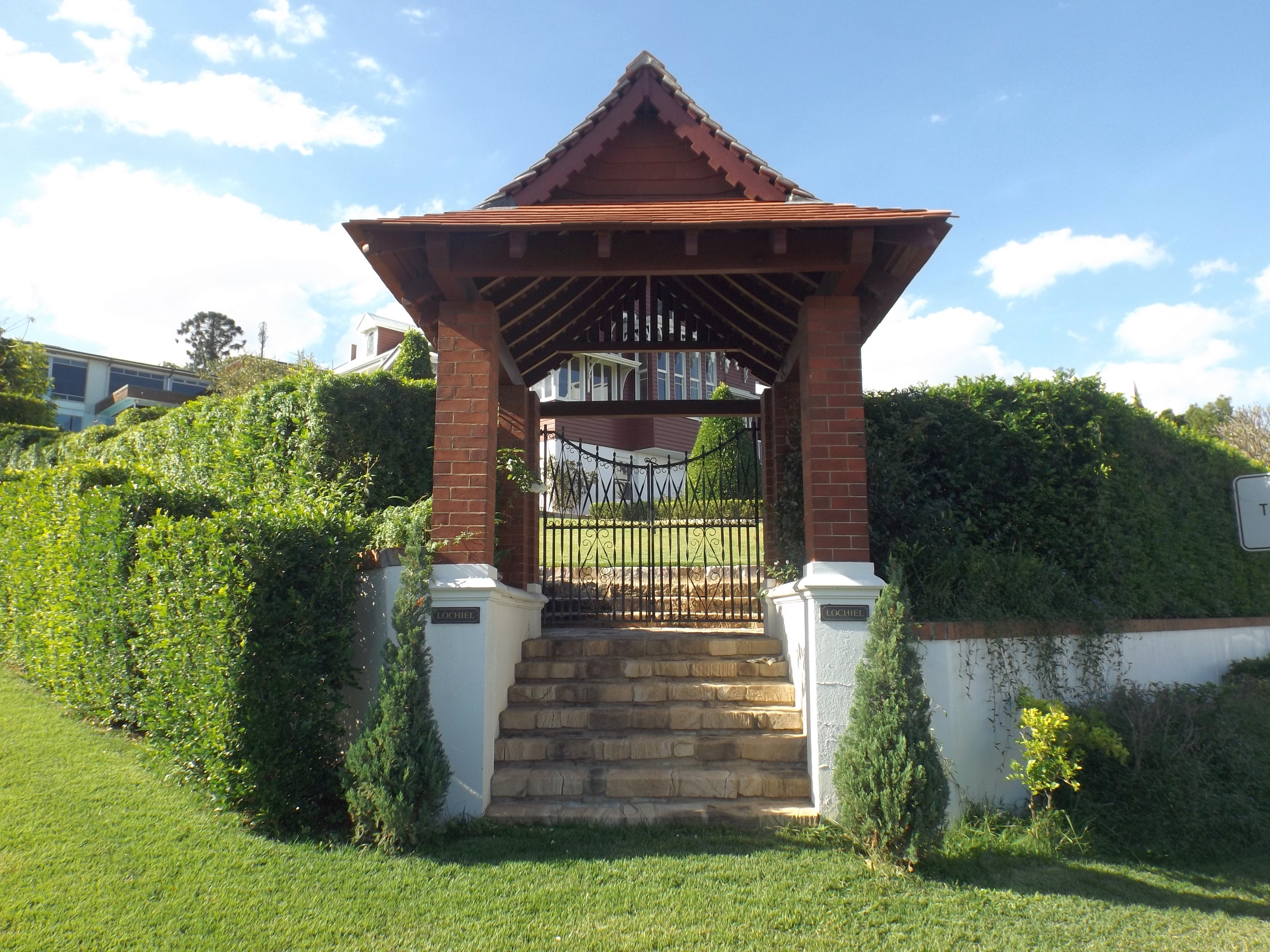
Street entrance gate, 2015

Lochiel is a two-storeyed with basement timber structure with a masonry core and a corrugated iron gable roof. It is located on the northeastern corner of Toorak Road and Hillside Crescent, on the south facing slope of Toorak Hill overlooking the Hamilton Reach of the Brisbane River to the south. Lochiel has substantial gardens/plantings, and ancillary structures including garages (former stables), shed, and lych gate.

Lochiel was constructed as a private residence and underwent two major extensions before its conversion into six flats. The earliest section of the building consisted of the existing masonry core, which comprises a south facing wing with basement rooms, and a wing at the rear forming an L-shaped plan. A large timber "museum" wing was added to the western end of the building forming a U-shaped plan. This wing is high-set with a recessed masonry enclosed room below. The rear wing was extended to the north and a second storey added, and later the courtyard space at the rear was enclosed. The building was subsequently converted into flats.

The main entrance to Lochiel, when still a single residence, was from the south fronting Hillside Crescent. The southern elevation is high-set and consists of the "museum" wing at the western end, with an enclosed verandah with a corrugated iron skillion roof and brick piers which returns along the eastern side of the building.

A wide entrance stair, with rendered masonry upstands to either side, is located centrally. Non-original timber framed French doors with obscured glass panes and sidelights are located at the top of the stair, the verandah has been enclosed with glass louvres and compressed sheeting, and latticed timber panels are located between the brick piers supporting the verandah. The eastern gable end of the roof has decorative timber bargeboards, and a deck opening from the first floor of the rear wing is located adjacent to the gable end and is supported by timber posts above the enclosed eastern verandah.

The deck has cross-braced timber balustrades and a decorative porch/aedicule forming the entrance to the first floor. The porch/aedicule has paired timber posts with cross-bracing, latticed timber valance, louvred timber shutters above balustrade height, and decorative timber gable with battens and curved timber elements. The decorative southern gable of the first floor is located above the porch/aedicule, and has a battened timber screen with an arched central section and curved timber trim. A sash window with corrugated iron sunhood is located adjacent to the porch/aedicule.

The two-storeyed rear wing is constructed of chamferboard, and overhangs the ground floor of the early rear wing on the eastern and northern sides and is supported by timber posts with curved brackets. The eastern elevation of the first floor has centrally located French doors accessed via an external timber stair, and flanked by sash windows with timber shutters to either side. A continuous corrugated iron sunhood supported by curved timber brackets shades the first floor windows and doors. The northern elevation has a large L-shaped timber stair, which bridges a driveway, accessing a central first floor porch. The porch has paired timber posts with cross-bracing, cross-braced balustrades, and non-original French doors with obscured glass panes. The porch is flanked by sash windows, and a continuous corrugated iron sunhood supported by curved timber brackets shades the windows and porch. The stair has a stepped battened timber balustrade, and the southern gable has a battened timber screen with an arched central section at the base.

The western elevation of the first floor has sash windows with timber shutters flanking a smaller non-original casement window. A continuous corrugated iron sunhood supported by curved timber brackets shades these windows.

The northern rear side of Lochiel consists of the enclosed courtyard flanked by the two-storeyed rear wing to the east, and the "museum" wing to the west. The enclosed courtyard has a corrugated iron skillion roof supported by timber posts, with louvred glass panels and compressed sheeting forming the exterior wall. A recessed entrance is located centrally, with multi-paned bifolding timber doors. A rendered masonry chimney is located at the rear of the original section of the building adjacent to the enclosed courtyard.

The "museum" wing is constructed of chamferboard and has a corrugated iron gable roof and is supported by brick piers with latticed timber infill panels. The southern elevation is highly decorative, with a central bay window flanked by non-original casement windows (with a corner window unit to the southwest corner) and surmounted by timber detailing to the gable. The bay has narrow sash windows with etched and coloured glass panes and timber shutters. The bay is crowned by a timber valance consisting of triple curved sections, and paired lancet windows with leadlight panels are located in the gable above. The gable has a metal finial, and a battened timber screen with an arched central section and curved timber trim supported by curved timber brackets. A non original door is located on the eastern side of the bay and is accessed via a timber stair.

The rear elevation of the "museum" wing has a metal finial and a battened timber screen to the gable, similar to the front elevation however without any of the decorative timber detailing and trim. Paired lancet windows with leadlight panels are located in the gable above a lean-to addition, which consists of an early section at the western end (possibly part of the original "museum" wing), and later enclosures at the eastern end. The lean-to has louvred glass windows as well as a row of fixed glass high level windows.

An entrance to the rear lean-to, with a corrugated iron hood with curved timber brackets, is located on the western side. A porch with decorative timber detailing protects a second entrance located mid-way along the western elevation (this entrance was possibly originally a bay window). The porch has a gable roof with latticed timber gable panel and balustrade, curved valance and paired timber posts with cross-bracing. A continuous window hood surmounts several non-original casement windows, and two dormer windows with arched leadlight panels are located on the western side of the roof.

An internal lightwell, created during the conversion of the building to flats, is located on the eastern side of the "museum" wing.

Internally, the earliest section of the building is of rendered masonry construction and comprises two large rooms either side of a wide central hall fronting the southern verandah. Both rooms have wide timber architraves and skirtings, French doors opening to the verandah, a panelled timber door with deep reveals opening into the central hall, and a fireplace with marble surround flanked by narrow windows (now closed over but originally opened to the rear courtyard) either side. The western room has an infilled opening on the western side and a coffered ceiling with timber beams and cornice, and the eastern room has a plaster ceiling and cornice. The central hall has a plaster ceiling and cornice, and the end has been partitioned off to create a storage cupboard and the original opening to the rear has been infilled, but its form is still visible from the rear. The enclosed verandah has a raked boarded ceiling, and the western end has been partitioned off with French doors accessing a bathroom with terrazzo floor. The enclosed eastern verandah houses a kitchen area at the northern end.

Internally, the rear wing is also of rendered masonry construction and comprises two large rooms with plaster ceilings and cornices, and deep timber skirtings and a timber fireplace surround to the central room. Both rooms have non-original multi-paned doors opening onto the enclosed verandah/undercroft space of the two-storeyed rear wing. The northern end of this space houses a bathroom, and the northern end of the masonry rear wing has been extended with the addition of a kitchen (possibly a free-standing structure added prior to the construction of the second storey). This kitchen structure has a raked ceiling on either side to the underside of the collar-beam, two small centrally pivoted windows which open against the rear of the end wall of the masonry wing, and a door and sash window opening to the rear.

The enclosed courtyard has been partitioned into several rooms, and has raked boarded ceilings and timber floors. The posts supporting the skillion roof have chamfered corners and are set back in line with the rear of the "museum" wing.

Internally, the "museum" wing currently houses two flats, but originally consisted of predominantly one large room with exposed tie-beams and hammer-posts with decorative curved timber brackets and raked boarded ceiling. A non-original ceiling has been installed to the underside of the tie-beams, and the space above, which is lit by the leadlight gable and dormer windows, remains intact with evidence of the original location of exhibits being visible. The original timber floor, consisting of alternately dark and light timber boards giving a striped appearance remains intact.

The "museum" has been partitioned into several rooms, with plaster ceilings and cornices, timber architraves and skirtings, and casement windows. A boarded ceiling with deep cornices and high level windows is located in the rear northeast room, which is the location of the maid's dining room and scullery prior to the building's conversion into flats. The rear room (within the lean-to) has boarded walls and raked ceiling, and was used as a work room at the rear of the museum prior to the conversion into flats. A lightwell has been inserted into the eastern side of the "museum" wing adjacent to the early section of the structure (in place of the original openings into the museum from the former dining room and courtyard), and provides light and ventilation to internal rooms adjacent.

The basement of the early masonry core is constructed of painted stone with brick quoining, and comprises two large rooms either side of a narrow central room. The floor of the western room is below the adjacent ground level, and a doorway to the west is accessed via stone steps. A barred window with arched header opens to the south below the verandah, and a fireplace is located against the northern wall with a narrow window adjacent. The narrow central room opens off the western room via an adjoining doorway, and has a barred window with arched header to the south. The floor of the eastern room is at the adjacent ground level, and the room is accessed via a low opening to the east, with a window with arched header to the south. A flight of stone steps is located against the northern wall at the rear of the western room, and leads to the underside of the enclosed courtyard floor.

A masonry room is located below the "museum" wing. This room is constructed of mostly unpainted brickwork, with some rendered brickwork at the front, and has tall sash windows opening to the surrounding below floor space. The room is accessed via a door in the eastern wall (adjacent to the door accessing the basement of the early masonry core) and a door in the western wall fronting the adjacent garden. A concrete path with brick retaining wall wraps around the rear of this room with a gate accessing the adjacent garden. Internally, this room has a ripple-iron ceiling and timber architraves.

Lochiel has extensive gardens, particularly to the southern part of the property. A decorative lych gate is located at the southeast of the garden, on the corner of Toorak Road and Hillside Crescent. The lych gate has brick piers surmounting rendered retaining walls either side of a flight of concrete steps. The piers support a decorative hipped gable shingle roof, which has terracotta finials at the corners, and curved projecting rafters with shaped ends. Steel gates with a concave top edge are fixed to the garden side of the lych gate. The gates access a gravel path which leads to the southern entrance to Lochiel. Both Toorak Road and Hillside Crescent frontages have rendered brick retaining walls/fences, with a driveway gate at the northern end of the property.

The gravel path from the lych gate leads to a circular area with a central tree. From this area, a set of concrete steps accesses a path/terrace surmounting an embankment, with a second set of concrete steps leading to the southern entrance to Lochiel. The circular area has a stone threshold and stone pillar, and the gravel path has stone edgings and stone garden features.

The southwest section of the garden consists of a grove of mature trees with a wide terrace below a dry-stone embankment. A masonry retaining wall separates this area from a raised lawn and garden on the western side of the structure. The southeast section of the garden has an open lawn bordered by mature trees and shrubs. A masonry retaining wall separates this area from a raised lawn and garden on the eastern side of Lochiel.

A storage shed is located to the east of Lochiel at the northern end of the lawn. The shed has a gable roof with ribbed pan and corrugated iron sheeting and chamferboard walls. The southern gable has decorative timber bargeboards surmounting a gabled porch with latticed timber gable panel and decorative timber detailing. Lean-to structures have been added to the sides and rear of this building.

The rear of the property comprises an area of lawn with stone retaining walls to the rear boundary. Garages are located at the northwest corner of the property. The garages have a corrugated iron skillion roof supported by timber posts, with a weatherboard wall at the eastern end and timber garage doors. The garages contain part of the squared rubble-coursed sandstone structure of the original stables. The sandstone forms the rear wall of the structure, with three transverse wall sections, and the western end wall has a raked parapet. Brickwork surmounts the rear sandstone wall forming a parapet, and an early set of steps is located adjacent to the western end wall. The floor of the garage is concrete.

== Heritage listing ==
Lochiel was listed on the Queensland Heritage Register on 28 May 1999 having satisfied the following criteria.

The place is important in demonstrating the evolution or pattern of Queensland's history.

Arguably unique and indeed highly idiosyncratic Lochiel comprises a substantial house, outbuildings, and large established garden situated on the lower slopes of Toorak Hill overlooking the Brisbane River. It is a rare, intact, and fine example of a suburban estate; its evolution over several stages (the earliest believed to date from the 1860s) well illustrating the development of Brisbane and one of its earliest suburbs, Hamilton.

The place demonstrates rare, uncommon or endangered aspects of Queensland's cultural heritage.

Arguably unique and indeed highly idiosyncratic Lochiel comprises a substantial house, outbuildings, and large established garden situated on the lower slopes of Toorak Hill overlooking the Brisbane River. It is a rare, intact, and fine example of a suburban estate; its evolution over several stages (the earliest believed to date from the 1860s) well illustrating the development of Brisbane and one of its earliest suburbs, Hamilton. The early masonry core of the house, with surviving lower service area, is both a fine and rare surviving example of its type. The more idiosyncratic nature of Lochiel is more particularly found however in the form, placement, and exuberant detailing of the substantial timber additions (museum c. 1906 and upper eastern wing by 1927) and in the very building of the museum room as a purpose built private exhibition space. The garden including structural elements (such as paths, steps, walls, and decorative features) and mature plantings is also considered a rare and intact example of a pre World War II garden.

The place has potential to yield information that will contribute to an understanding of Queensland's history.

An investigation of the fabric of the house and garden and the publication of information believed held by the Cameron family have the potential to substantially contribute to the further understanding of the history of Lochiel.

The place is important in demonstrating the principal characteristics of a particular class of cultural places.

It is a rare, intact, and fine example of a suburban estate; its evolution over several stages (the earliest believed to date from the 1860s) well illustrating the development of Brisbane and one of its earliest suburbs, Hamilton. The early masonry core of the house, with surviving lower service area, is both a fine and rare surviving example of its type.

The garden including structural elements (such as paths, steps, walls, and decorative features) and mature plantings is also considered a rare and intact example of a pre World War II garden

The place is important because of its aesthetic significance.

Lochiel has considerable aesthetic qualities including the picturesque qualities of the house and garden (including garden structures) and the site itself with its views to the river

The place has a special association with the life or work of a particular person, group or organisation of importance in Queensland's history.

Lochiel has a long association with JF Buckland, who was prominent in Brisbane's civic affairs. For over a century it has remained in the ownership of the Cameron family, a testament to the particular vision of JS Cameron.
