= Hamilton State School =

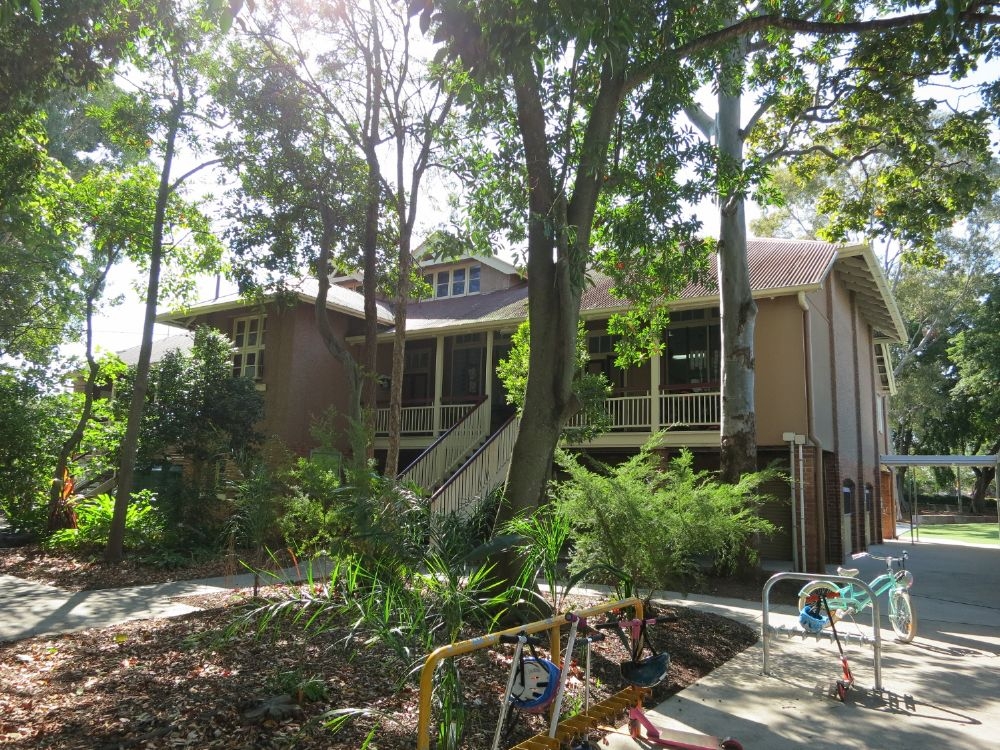
- Block A and its garden forecourt

- Location within Queensland
- 27.4327°S 153.0741°E
- Location: Oxford Street, Hamilton, City of Brisbane, Queensland, Australia

History
- Design period: 1900–1914 (Early 20th century)
- Built: 1907

Queensland Heritage Register
- Official name: Hamilton State School
- Type: state heritage
- Designated: 30 November 2018
- Reference no.: 650088
- Type: Education, Research, Scientific Facility: School – state (primary)
- Theme: Educating Queenslanders: Providing primary schooling

Hamilton State School is a heritage-listed state school at Oxford Street, Hamilton, City of Brisbane, Queensland, Australia. It was built in 1907. It was added to the Queensland Heritage Register on 30 November 2018.

== History ==
Hamilton State School, opened in 1907, is located in the riverside residential suburb of Hamilton, 6.3 kilometres (3.9 mi) north-east of Brisbane's central business district (CBD). The school is important in demonstrating the evolution of state education and its associated architecture. It comprises an attractive urban brick school building (1907), set in landscaped grounds with mature trees, assembly and play areas, and sporting facilities. The school has a strong and ongoing association with the Hamilton community.

Located within the traditional lands of the Turrbal people, the school site was part of more than 65 acres (26 ha) purchased from the New South Wales government in 1843 by Captain John Clements Wickham, the Government Resident in Brisbane until 1859. Subsequent to his death in 1864, his trustees subdivided the land and a "monster land sale" of the Wickham Estate at Hamilton was announced in the press in April 1885. Between December 1886 and March 1889, the 20 residential allotments that later formed the school site, totalling 2 acres (0.81 ha), were purchased by Henry Charles Cleeve, a commission agent. He was declared insolvent in 1891 and the property was transferred to Mary Jane Hampstead in 1892.

The suburb of Hamilton, initially accessed via Eagle Farm Road (later Hamilton Road and now Kingsford Smith Drive) from the convict-built Breakfast Creek Bridge, was noted by the 1860s for its fine villas and gentlemen's estates sited on elevated land. The Queensland Turf Club established its racecourse nearby from 1863, and the Hamilton Hotel, which gave its name to the suburb, opened around that time.

The availability of transport from the city made the area attractive for residential development, with much of it subdivided by 1895. The railway to Eagle Farm Racecourse opened on 3 September 1882. Horse-drawn bus and tram services to the city were also available, and in 1899 were replaced by an electric tram service terminating at the end of Racecourse Road. Hamilton was managed by the Toombul Divisional Board from 1883, but by 1890 became a separate division. With a population of 2660 by 1891, it became the Town of Hamilton by 1904.

The closest state school for Hamilton residents was the Eagle Farm State School on Nudgee Road, which had operated since 1864. It was considered too distant from the growing population in the new subdivisions, and in poor condition. A request for a new school in the Eagle Farm-Hamilton area was made in 1899. Hampstead's land was purchased by the Department of Public Instruction in January 1900. Representatives of the Eagle Farm School Committee met with the Minister for Education to request a new school be built on this Hamilton property, financed by the sale of the existing Eagle Farm School. However, the Education Act 1875 required the community to provide one fifth of the cost of the school. By 1905, the committee had raised the required funds and plans for a brick building had been produced by the Department of Public Works (DPW); but construction did not proceed. In 1906, the head teacher at Eagle Farm State School advised that 70 per cent of students lived on the south side of the railway line and were walking long distances to school. When the government finally agreed to proceed with a school at Hamilton in May 1906, it was on the proviso that the Eagle Farm State School be closed. This did not occur and the latter remains operational as the Hendra State School, having been renamed in 1908.

Tenders were called for a new brick school at Hamilton in July 1906. The successful tenderer was Alfred Henry Barltrop, a local builder who was on the Eagle Farm State School committee and had recently repaired that school. Barltrop's tender was for £1531. His brother William, also a builder, was secretary of the Hamilton School Committee, which organised local member Andrew Petrie, M.L.A. to officially open the new school and hoist the Union Jack on the school flagpole on 16 March 1907.

The urban brick school building (now called Block A) constructed at Hamilton State School was individually designed by the DPW. Brick school buildings were built far less frequently than timber ones, only being provided in prosperous urban or suburban areas with stable or rapidly increasing populations. All brick school buildings were individually designed with variations in style, size, and form, but generally retained similar classroom sizes, layouts and window arrangements to timber schools, to facilitate natural light and ventilation. However, compared to contemporary standard education buildings, these buildings had a grander character and greater landmark attributes.

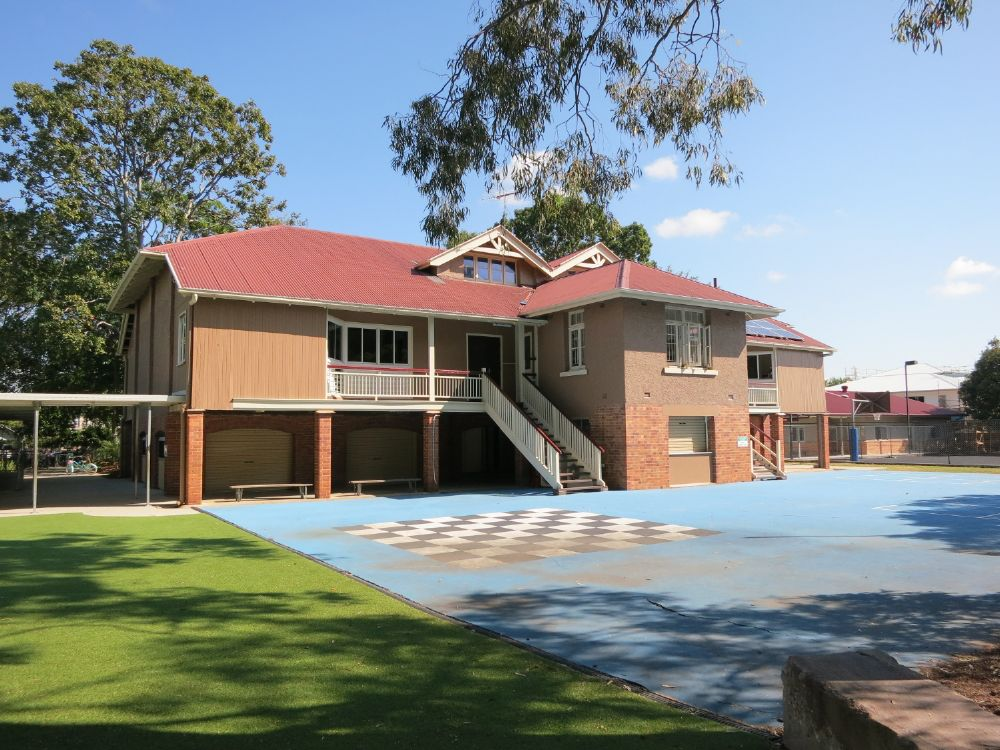
Block A and the rear parade ground

Block A provided accommodation for 243 pupils in two classrooms. The building was 80 by 25 feet (24.4 by 7.6 m) and built 7 feet (2.1 m) above the ground, with the area under the school asphalted as a play space. The brick walls were arched on the lower level allowing access to the undercroft. Verandahs on the east and west sides of the building were 10 feet (3.0 m) wide. Exterior walls were rough-cast rendered on the upper level, and plastered internally. The classrooms were separated by a glazed partition. The school grounds were fenced and there were four water tanks, one located beneath each corner of the building. The design of the school was described as combining the latest ideas in state schools and responding to the climate better than any other school in the state. It had an excellent system of lighting and ventilation, incorporating dormer windows and a prominent ventilation fleche.

Teaching commenced at Hamilton State School on 19 March 1907 with 190 students enrolled. However, an inspection in 1916 showed that it was overcrowded, with children being taught on the verandahs and underneath the school building in a makeshift classroom. This was due to population growth. In the Hamilton Town Council area, the population increased by 81 per cent between 1911 and 1921. The school inspector suggested that the temporary classroom be converted into a permanent one by inserting windows into the walls to allow more light and provide shelter from westerly winds. Subsequently, in 1917 the southern end of the undercroft was partially enclosed to create a classroom for infants. Plans for an extension to the school were made, but never executed. Prior to 1940 the north end of the east verandah was enclosed to create a teachers room. Evidence for this teachers room is on a plan dated 1940, which shows that a partition to the "existing Teachers Room" in this location was to be removed to create a new hat room.

Toilet blocks had been added to the site by 1930 with a girls block on the northern boundary and a boys block on the southern boundary.

An important component of Queensland state schools was their grounds. The early and continuing commitment to play-based education, particularly in primary school, resulted in the provision of outdoor play space and sporting facilities, such as playing fields and tennis courts. Also, trees and gardens were planted to shade and beautify schools. Arbor Day celebrations began in Queensland in 1890. Aesthetically designed gardens were encouraged by regional inspectors, and educators believed gardening and Arbor Days instilled in young minds the value of hard work and activity, improved classroom discipline, developed aesthetic tastes, and inspired people to stay on the land.

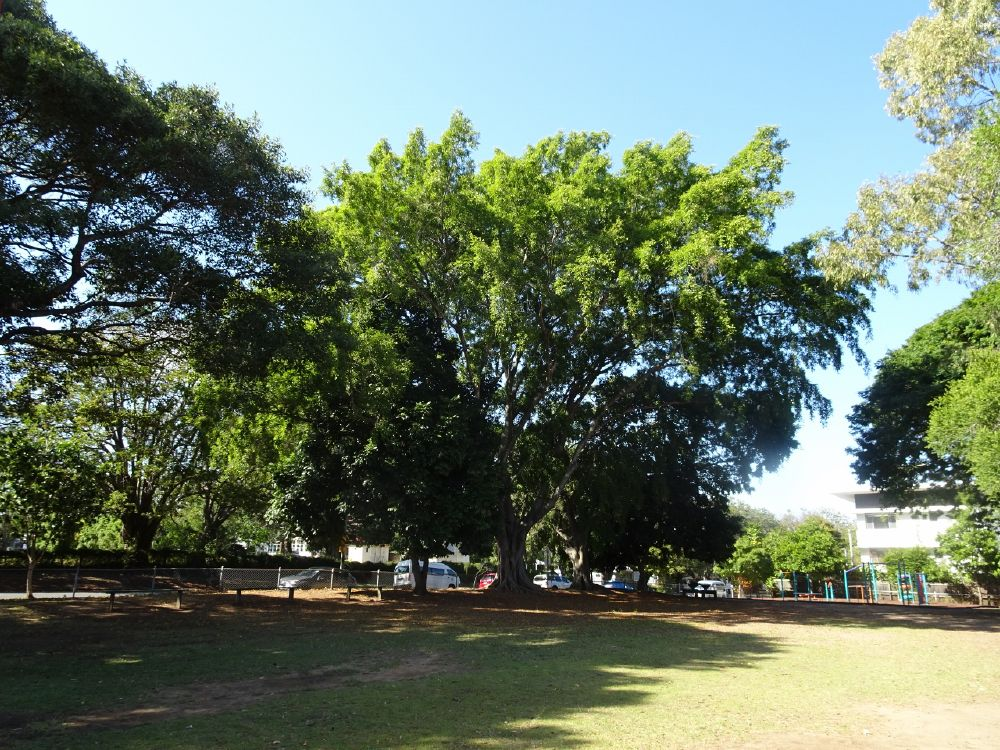
Mature trees on the eastern (Windsor Street) boundary

Arbor Day was celebrated at Hamilton State School from at least 1912. By 1925 there were 39 trees planted in the school grounds including: Weeping figs (Ficus benjamina), Moreton Bay chestnuts (Castanospermum australe), Cocos or queen palms (Syagrus romanzoffiana), Macadamia nut trees (Macadamia integrifolia), Camphor laurels (Cinnamomum camphora) and Candlenut trees (Aleurites moluccanus). Aerial photography dating from 1936 shows extensive tree planting along all boundary fences, except along the eastern half of the southern boundary. In July 1941 a pergola over the front steps of the school building was completed at a cost of £4.

The commencement of the Pacific theatre of World War II (WWII) in December 1941, with its threat to Australia, resulted in the Queensland Government closing all coastal state schools in January 1942. Most schools, including Hamilton State School, reopened on 2 March 1942, but student attendance was optional until the war ended.

Typically, schools were a focus for civilian duty during wartime. Students and staff members grew produce and flowers for donation to local hospitals and organised fundraising and the donation of useful items to Australian soldiers on active service. During 1943, male pupils at Hamilton State School cultivated vegetables and flowers in the school grounds, which were sold to raise money for the war effort, while female pupils knitted socks, mittens, and rugs for the Red Cross.

Changes to the school were planned at the end of World War II. In February 1945, it was announced that sewerage would be installed and the classrooms remodelled. This work was funded during the 1945–46 financial year, at a cost of £4,046. It included dividing the two classrooms to create four; new hat room enclosures at the verandah ends; changes to the size and location of windows; and the construction of a new brick teachers room off the centre of the rear verandah, with a concrete floor underneath. Gas and electric lights were to be installed. A new male teachers lavatory and store room were built beneath the 1907 teachers room, and toilets for girls and female staff in the undercroft. The c. 1930 girls toilet block was demolished by May 1946, and the boys toilet block was replaced in the same location by May 1946.

The Department of Public Instruction was largely unprepared for the enormous demand for state education between the late 1940s and the 1960s. This was a nation-wide occurrence resulting from immigration and the unprecedented population growth now termed the "baby boom". Queensland schools were overcrowded and, to cope, many new buildings were constructed and existing buildings were extended. A temporary building of two classrooms was constructed for the school during the 1949–50 financial year. A series of other temporary buildings were constructed on the school site, and later removed, as enrolments changed.

A number of changes were made to the undercroft of the school building in the late 1970s, including enclosing beneath the east teachers room to create a health room (now a tuck shop), and the construction of a store room.

Also in the 1970s, the native tree garden on the west (Oxford Street) side of the school building was planned and planted by students. In 2018, the boundary planting scheme from pre-1936 are largely retained along the eastern and western boundaries, and a mature leopard tree (Flindersia maculosa), planted by c. 1960 is located northeast of the interwar boys toilets.

Throughout the school's existence, it has been the focus and site of community events. The school became the home of the Hamilton Progress Association, inaugurated in September 1907. The school grounds hosted a variety of carnivals and fetes to raise money for the School of Arts, St Augustine's Church and for the school, as well as school break-ups. Other early fundraising events held included a moonlight boat trip to the river mouth in 1908, and a fancy dress ball in 1913. Throughout the 1920s and 1930s, fancy dress balls were held annually. This tradition recommenced c. 1949 and was maintained until the 1970s when they were suspended.

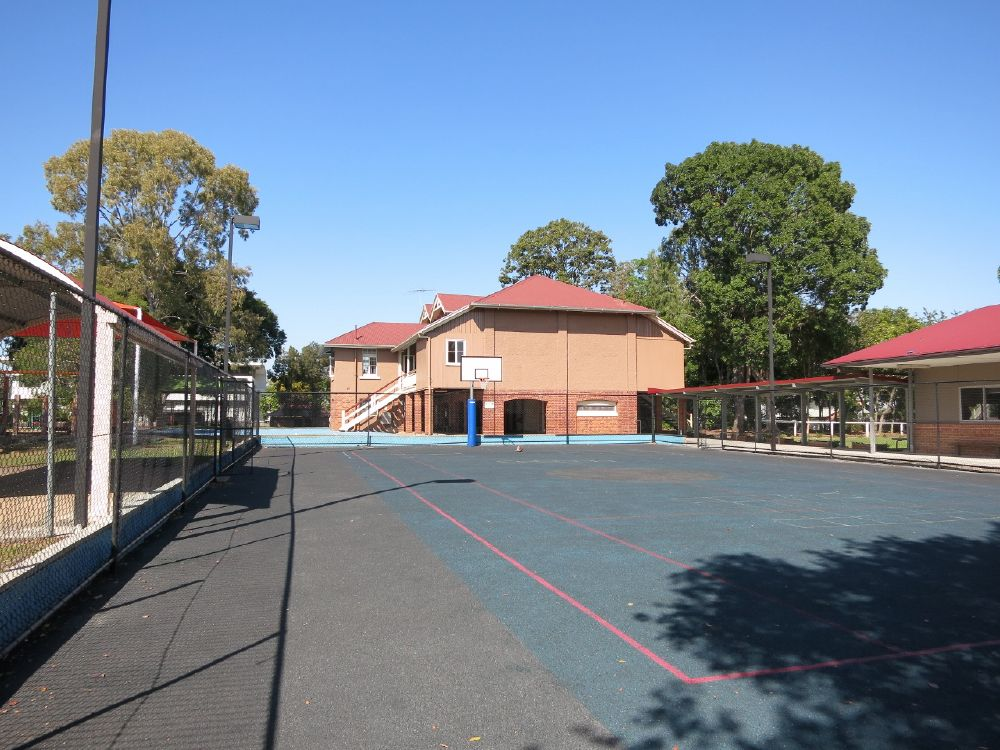
Multipurpose court

Other additions to the site have been made. Hamilton State School showed a strong interest in sport from early in its history, with a netball court on-site by July 1925 and a tennis court in situ by May 1930, both on the north side of the school building. Although sporting facilities were limited by the small size of the school's grounds, venues outside the school were used, for instance, in 1953 the school used the Hamilton Shift-workers Rugby League Club Oval at Hamilton. A parade ground was created east of the school building by 1967. The tennis court was converted to a multipurpose court by 1998. The site of the netball court gained a new purpose in 2012 when a federally funded library-administration block was constructed in the northwest corner of the site, adjacent to the tennis court. A preschool building has been added in the southwest of the grounds.

Alterations to the classrooms and east verandah of Block A were carried out after October 1998. Two of the 1945 partitions were replaced with concertina screen doors; large openings were cut into the eastern classroom wall; and most of the east verandah was enclosed, however, in order to preserve the original timber balustrade, the walls were stepped back. The undercroft toilets were renovated and reconfigured in 2006. The infill walls enclosing the 1917 undercroft classroom (used as the Outside School Hours Care room in 2018) have been removed and replaced with new partitions and roller doors.

In 2018, Hamilton State School continues to operate from its original site and has an enrolment of about 117 pupils. It retains an urban brick school building with beautiful attributes and streetscape presence; set in landscaped grounds with assembly and play areas, sporting facilities, and mature trees. The school is important to Hamilton, as a key social focus for the community, as generations of students have been taught there and many social events held in the school's grounds and buildings since its establishment.

== Description ==
Hamilton State School is located at the eastern end of the Brisbane suburb of Hamilton, approximately 6.3 kilometres (3.9 mi) northeast of the city centre. It occupies a rectangular, 0.81-hectare (2.0-acre) site bounded by Oxford Street to the west and Windsor Street to the east, within a residential area on the south side of Doomben railway station. The site, accessed from Oxford Street, is beautified by mature trees lining the street boundaries, and the grounds include a forecourt, tennis court and rear parade ground.

Block A (1907, urban brick school building) faces Oxford Street and is centrally located on the site. It is the only building at the school protected by the heritage listing. It includes the 1945 additions and alterations.

=== Block A, urban brick school building ===
Block A is a highset, brick and timber building with an undercroft. It contains four classrooms on the first floor linked by verandahs along the length of the east and west sides. Both verandahs have a centrally located teachers room, and are accessed by two sets of timber stairs, positioned on either side of each teachers room. Parts of the undercroft are enclosed and contain store rooms, toilets, an Outside School Hours Care room, and a tuck shop.

=== Grounds ===
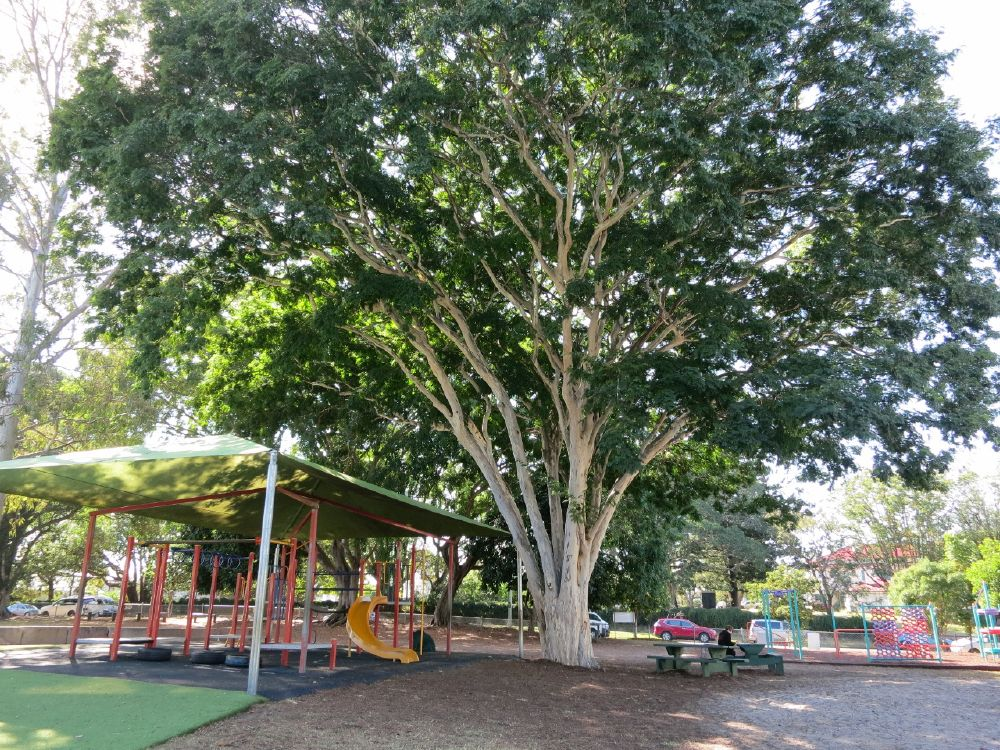
Mature Leopard tree in the southeast corner of the grounds

The school has a tradition of boundary tree plantings and the grounds retain numerous mature trees, including weeping figs (Ficus benjamina) and camphor laurels (Cinnamomum camphora) along the Oxford Street boundary; and weeping figs, a Moreton Bay fig (Ficus macrophylla) and Moreton Bay chestnuts (Castanospermum australe) along the Windsor Street boundary. A mature leopard tree (Flindersia maculosa) stands in the south-eastern corner of the grounds.

A multi-purpose sports court on the site of the original tennis court lies to the north of Block A. An open parade ground extends from the east (rear) side of Block A. On the west (front) side of Block A is a forecourt area that is landscaped with an established, 1970s scheme of gardens, trees and paths.

The flat and largely open site allows attractive views of Block A from Oxford and Windsor streets, framed by trees.

== Heritage listing ==
Hamilton State School was listed on the Queensland Heritage Register on 30 November 2018 having satisfied the following criteria.

The place is important in demonstrating the evolution or pattern of Queensland's history.

Hamilton State School (established in 1907) is important in demonstrating the evolution of state education and its associated architecture in Queensland. The place retains an excellent example of a Department of Public Works-designed school building that was an architectural response to prevailing government educational philosophies, set in landscaped grounds with provision of assembly and play areas, sporting facilities, and mature trees.

The urban brick school building (Block A, 1907) represents years of experimentation with natural light, classroom size and ventilation by the Department of Public Works. It also demonstrates a growing preference in the early 20th century for constructing brick school buildings at metropolitan schools in developing suburbs.

The suburban site with mature trees, and play and sporting facilities, demonstrates the importance of play and aesthetics in the education of children.

The place is important in demonstrating the principal characteristics of a particular class of cultural places.

Hamilton State School is important in demonstrating the principal characteristics of a Queensland state school. These include: purpose-designed teaching buildings by the Department of Public Works that incorporate undercroft play areas, verandahs, and classrooms with high levels of natural light and ventilation; and landscaped sites with mature shade trees and assembly and play areas.

Block A (1907) is an excellent, intact example of a purpose-designed urban brick school building in Queensland. It is important in demonstrating the principal characteristics of its type, which include: its highset form; linear layout, with classrooms and teachers rooms accessed by verandahs; undercrofts used as open play spaces; loadbearing, masonry construction, with face brick piers and arches to undercroft spaces; and stylistic features characteristic of its era of construction, which determined its roof form, decorative treatment and joinery. Typical of urban brick school buildings, it was built in a suburban area that was growing at the time of its construction.

The place is important because of its aesthetic significance.

Block A (1907) is highly intact and has aesthetic significance for its beautiful attributes, through its symmetrical layout, elegant composition, decorative treatment, and high quality materials including face brick and roughcast render.

The school is an attractive feature of the area and is significant for its streetscape contribution. Set back from the street behind a forecourt, Block A's setting is beautified by mature trees, which frame views of the school from Oxford and Windsor streets.

The place has a strong or special association with a particular community or cultural group for social, cultural or spiritual reasons.

Hamilton State School has a strong and ongoing association with former pupils, parents, staff members and the surrounding Hamilton community. Operating since 1907, generations of students have been taught at the school. The place is important for its contribution to the educational development of Hamilton and as a focus for the community.
