= Woolahra, Brisbane =

Woolahra
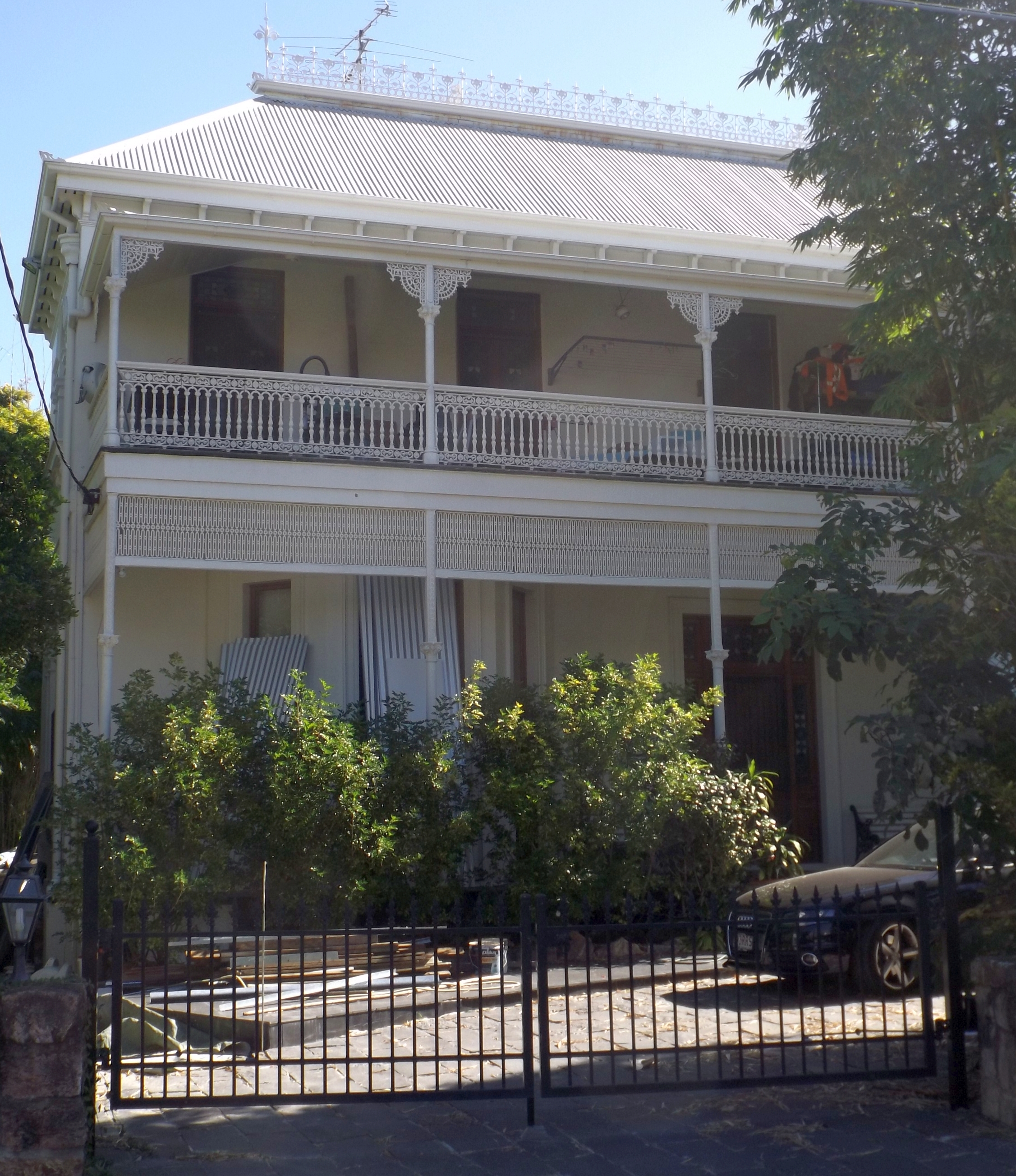
- Home in 2015

- Location within Queensland Location within Australia
- 27.4384°S 153.0633°E
- Location: 1 Lexington Terrace, Hamilton, City of Brisbane, Queensland, Australia

History
- Design period: 1870s–1890s (late 19th century)
- Built: c. 1888
- Built for: Charles and Ellen Elizabeth Pritchard

Site notes
- Architectural styles: Georgian, Renaissance

Queensland Heritage Register
- Official name: Woolahra
- Type: state heritage (landscape, built)
- Designated: 21 October 1992
- Reference no.: 600217
- Significant period: 1880s circa (fabric); 1880s–1890s (historical)
- Significant components: fence/wall – perimeter, residential accommodation – main house, trees/plantings

Woolahra is a heritage-listed villa at 1 Lexington Terrace, Hamilton, City of Brisbane, Queensland, Australia. It was built c. 1888. It was added to the Queensland Heritage Register on 21 October 1992.

== History ==
At the rear of the Hamilton Hotel, the first brickworks in Queensland was started by a Mr. Fisher, who later moved to Albion, and opened up the Albion Pottery (subsequently owned by James Campbell and Sons, Limited). The land on which Woolahra was built was the old brickworks site.

Woolahra, a two-storeyed brick house, was probably built in 1888 on land owned by Ellen Elizabeth Wheeler. A widow, she had bought the property in 1887.

Its first occupant appears to have been Charles Pritchard who married Mrs Wheeler. In 1896 the land was transferred to Ellen Elizabeth Pritchard. She died in 1932 and the house passed through a number of absentee owners who subdivided the property. The present owners bought the house and its remaining grounds in 1946.

== Description ==
Woolahra is a two-storey brick house which blends Georgian and Renaissance elements in its design. The house is T-shaped, with a one room wide wing across the front forming the crossbar, and a wider wing extending off the rear, forming the stem.

Its walls are rendered on the front and southern side, and painted on the northern side and the rear. The hipped corrugated iron roof has a decorative cast-iron comb along the ridges. A double storey verandah featuring decorative cast-iron posts, brackets, balusters and frieze, runs across the front of the house.

On the upper floor there are five French doors with leadlight fanlights and on the ground floor the front door has leadlight fan and sidelights with the name Woolahra incorporated. There are bay windows on either side. On the ends of the front wing there are heavily moulded Renaissance style windows which contrast with the simpler Georgian sash windows along the sides and rear of the back wing.

The theme of Georgian simplicity is continued inside the house where the lath and plaster walls and ceilings appear undecorated except for substantial joinery.

== Heritage listing ==
Woolahra was listed on the Queensland Heritage Register on 21 October 1992 having satisfied the following criteria.

The place is important in demonstrating the evolution or pattern of Queensland's history.

As a reflection of the confidence of the 1880s boom.

As an early example of the type of large houses built on the hills to the northeast of the city.

The place is important in demonstrating the principal characteristics of a particular class of cultural places.

As a late illustration of the Georgian style with the addition of renaissance details and ornate verandahs.

The place is important because of its aesthetic significance.

As a late illustration of the Georgian style with the addition of renaissance details and ornate verandahs.
