= Bretts Wharf =

Ferry terminal in Brisbane

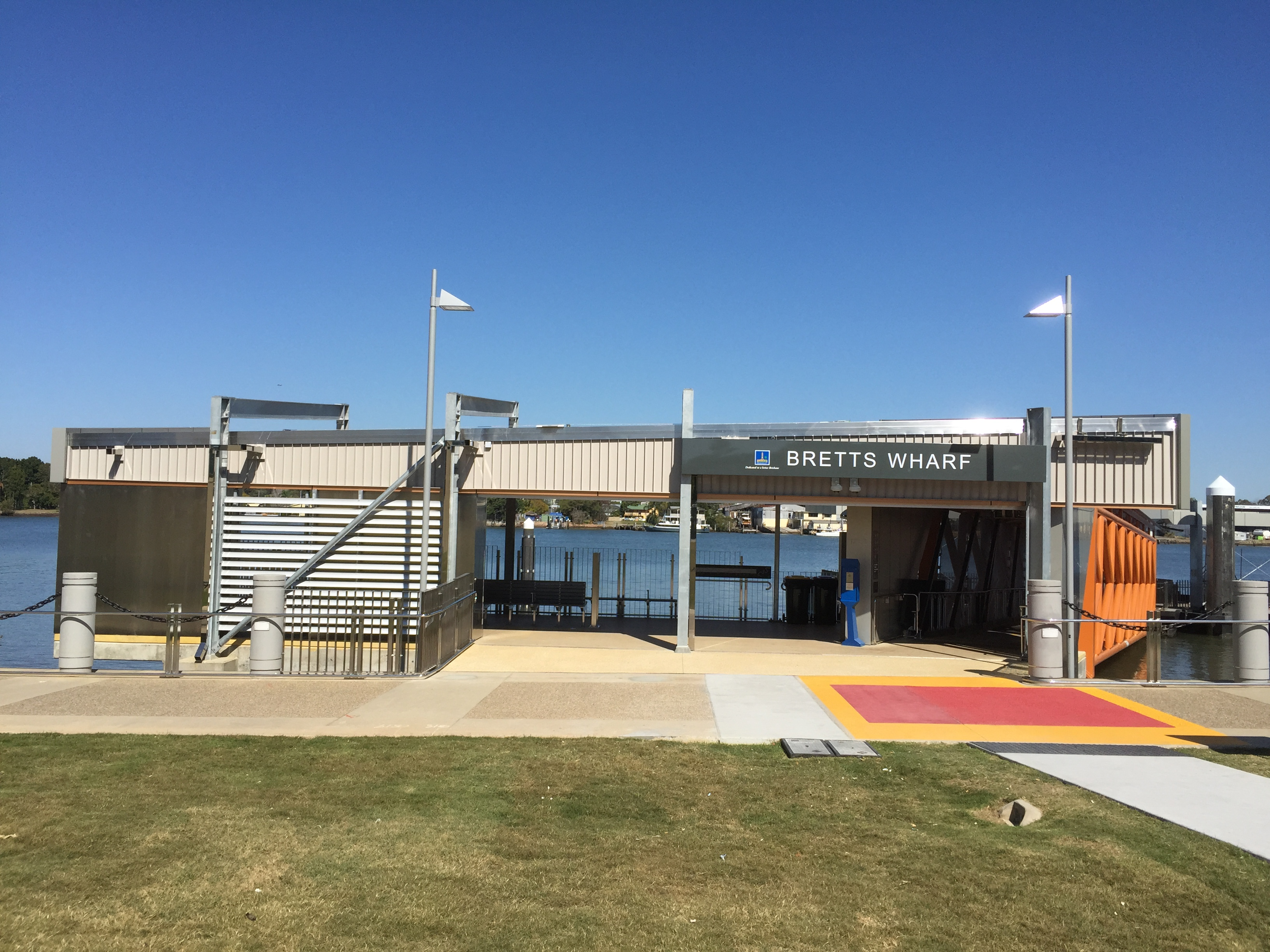
- New wharf in July 2015

General information
- Location: Kingsford Smith Drive, Hamilton
- Coordinates: 27°26′24″S 153°03′43″E
- Owner: Brisbane City Council
- Operator: RiverCity Ferries
- Platforms: 1

Construction
- Cycle facilities: Storage racks
- Accessible: Yes

Other information
- Station code: 319743
- Fare zone: go card 1

History
- Closed: 12 June 2015 (original)
- Rebuilt: 13 June 2015 (current)

Services
Preceding wharf	RiverCity Ferries	Following wharf
Teneriffe towards UQ St Lucia	CityCat	Apollo Road towards Northshore Hamilton
Location

Bretts Wharf is a ferry terminal on the northern bank of the Brisbane River in the suburb of Hamilton in the City of Brisbane, Queensland, Australia. It serves patrons from nearby Racecourse Road and Portside Wharf, as well as visitors to Eagle Farm Racecourse and Doomben Racecourse in the Brisbane suburbs of Hamilton and Ascot. Bretts Wharf was the terminus for downstream CityCat services until Apollo Road reopened in February 2008. It is served by RiverCity Ferries' CityCat services.

Bretts Wharf services patrons from nearby Racecourse Road and Portside Wharf, as well as visitors to Eagle Farm Racecourse. Translink bus services 300 and 305 have a stop adjacent to the wharf. Bretts Wharf was the terminus for downstream CityCat services until Apollo Road ferry wharf in Bulimba reopened in 2008.

== History ==
=== First wharf ===
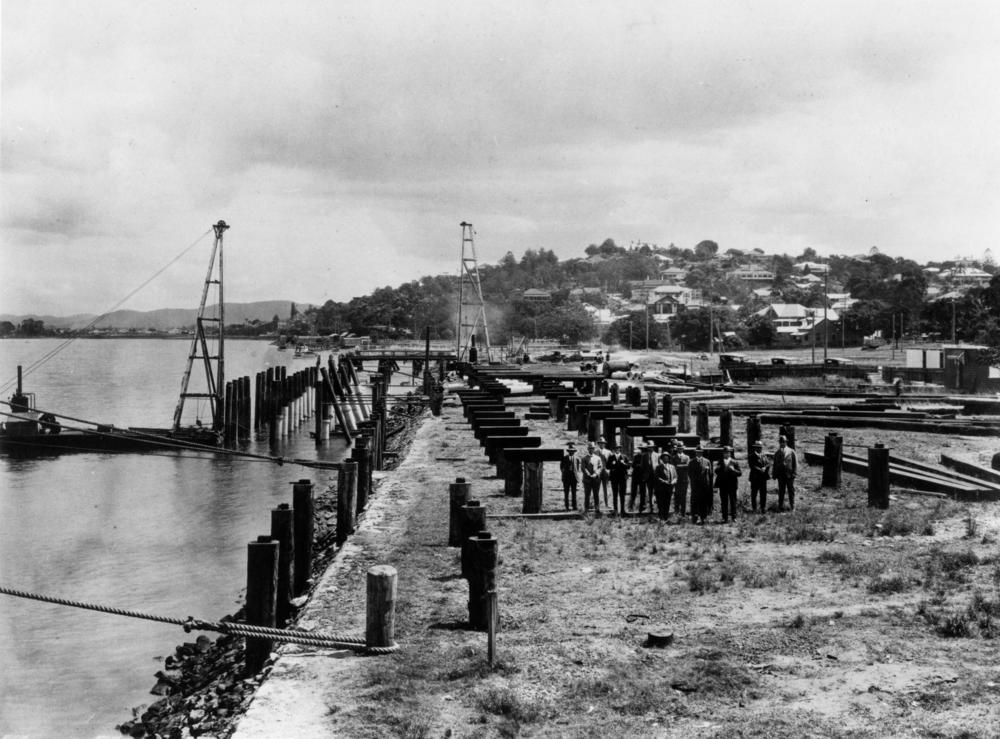
Original Bretts Wharf under construction in 1929

The land for the wharf was leased to Brett's Wharves and Stevedoring Co. Ltd in 1928. The first pile was driven on 16 January 1929 and the first ship berthed there on 26 July 1929.

The Brisbane River ferry service to Bulimba was extended to Bretts Wharf in 1933. The wharf was extended in 1937, giving a total berthing space of 946 ft (288 m). From 1942 to 1946, it was used exclusively by the United States Army to stage and load equipment for the Pacific War. Bretts Wharf closed to commercial shipping in 1993.

Cross river ferry services to Bretts Wharf from Apollo Road ceased in December 1998.

=== Second wharf ===
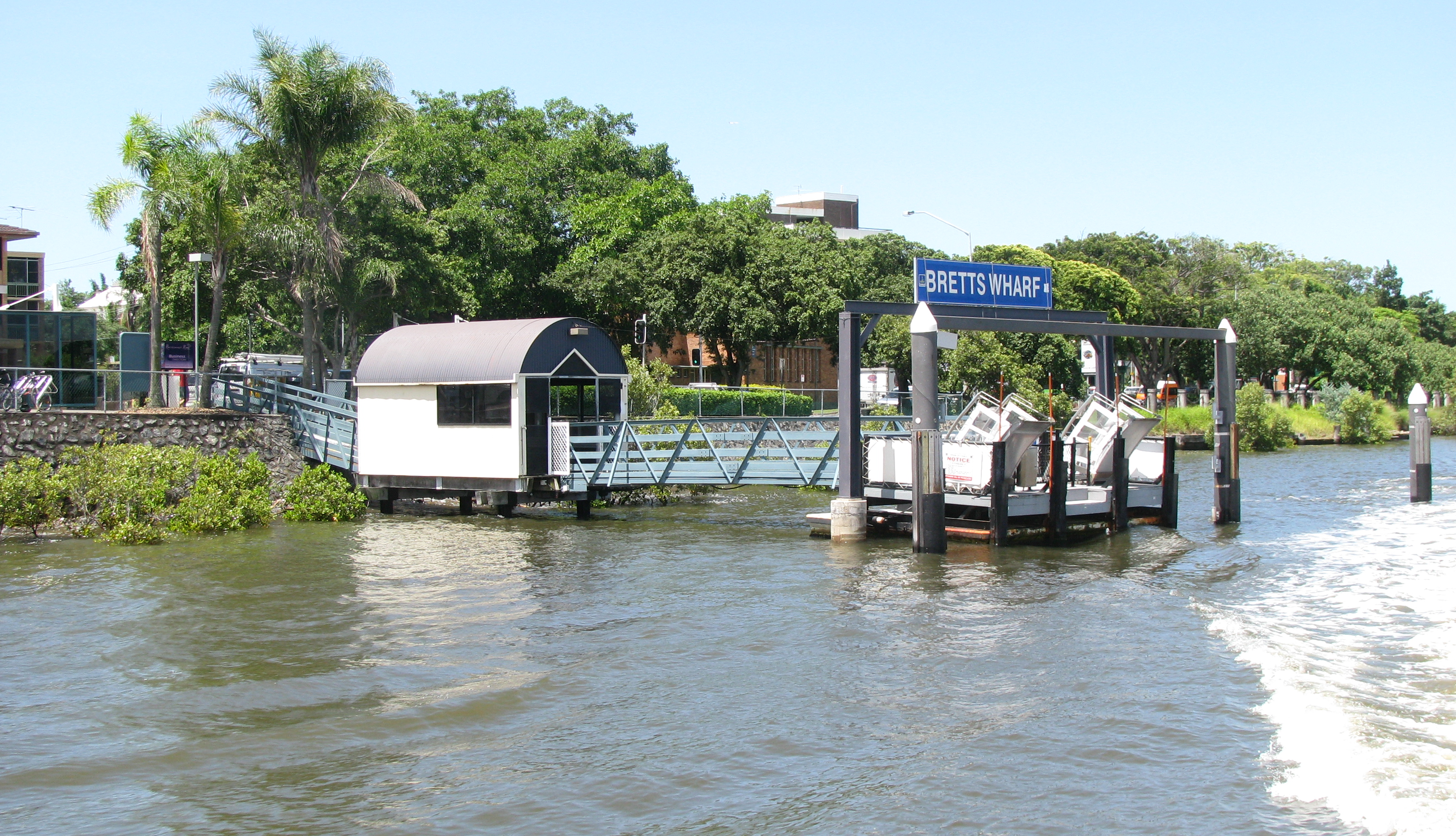
Second wharf in 2010

The wharf sustained minor damage during the January 2011 Brisbane floods. It reopened after repairs on 14 February 2011. It closed on 12 June 2015 and was demolished.

=== Third wharf ===
On 13 June 2015, a new wharf opened 200 metres east of the original wharf. It was built in association with improvement works to the adjoining Kingsford Smith Drive.

== Transport links ==
Transport for Brisbane operate two bus routes via Bretts wharf:

- 300: Toombul station to Cultural Centre busway station
- 305: Hamilton to Cultural Centre busway station
