= Hamilton Reach =

Reach of the Brisbane River in Australia

Coordinates: 27.440°S 153.055°E

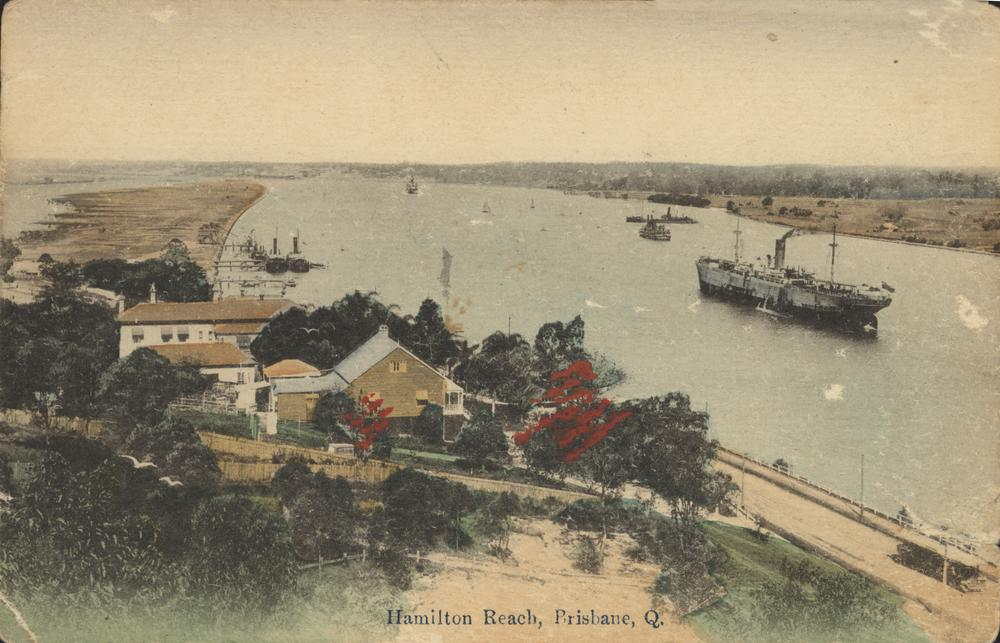
Hamilton Reach of the Brisbane River, circa 1912

Hamilton Reach is a reach of the Brisbane River in Brisbane, Queensland, Australia.

== Geography ==
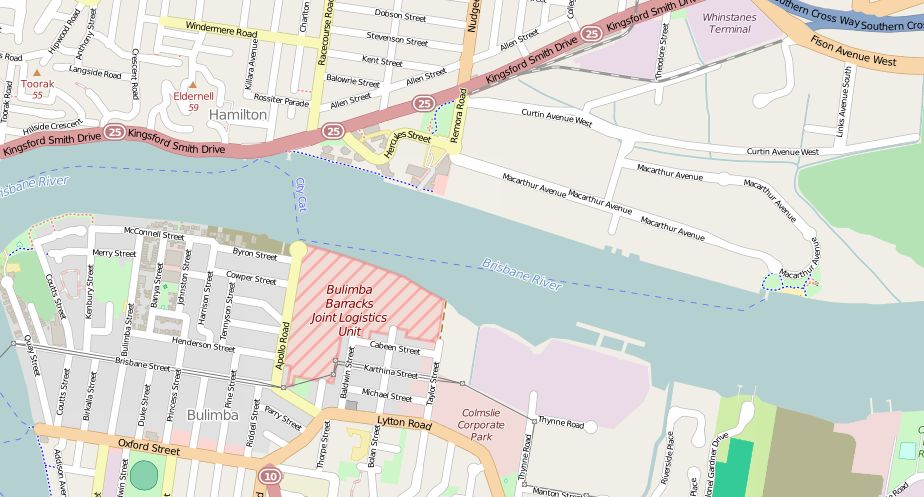
OpenStreetMap - Hamilton Reach, Brisbane River

Hamilton Reach flows from west (upstream) to east (downstream). The suburb of Hamilton is on its northern bank (and is most likely the origin of the name of the reach). The suburbs of Bulimba and Morningside lie to the south.

== History ==
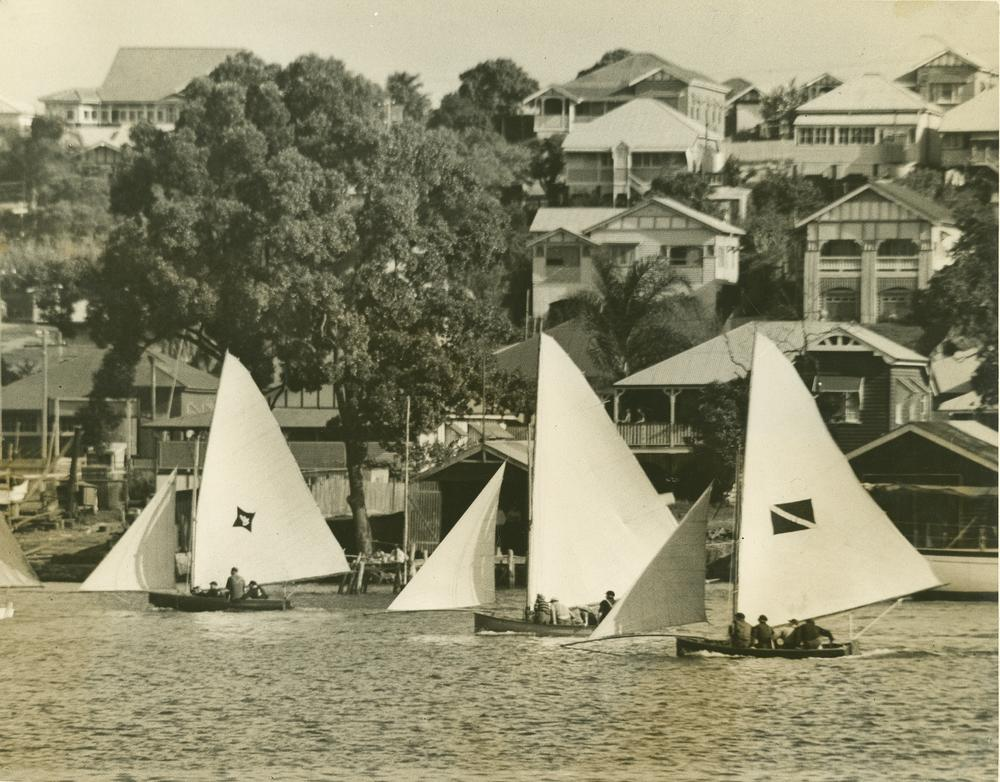
Sailboat racing at Hamilton Reach (Bulimba Hill in the background)

The Hamilton Reach is popular for water sports. It is popular for recreational and competitive sailing.

The Australian Rowing Championships were held at Hamilton Reach in 1904, 1909, and 1951. The Australian University Rowing Championships were held there in 1937, 1937 and 1955.

Prior to World War II, flying boats used Hamilton Reach as their base. However, the level of river traffic and the lack of night lighting resulted in the flying boats relocating to Redland Bay.

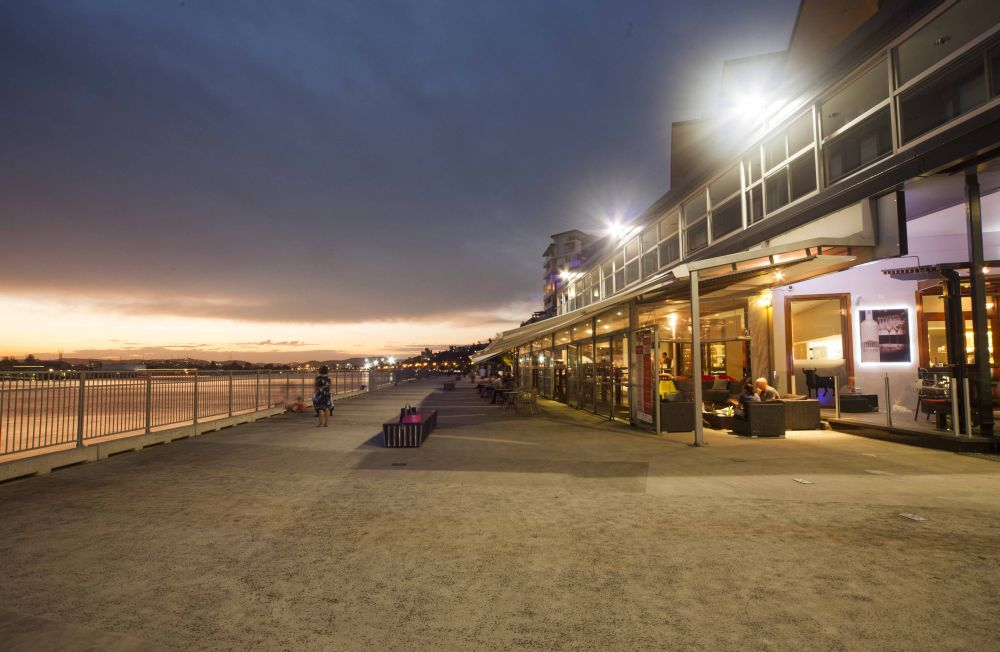
Portside Wharf River Walkway

Historically, the Brisbane River had many commercial wharves used for the shipping of goods and passengers. However, with the growth in the size of ships, the increasing residential characters of the suburbs alongside the river, and the need to construct bridges over the river, most commercial shipping is now handled at the Port of Brisbane at the mouth of the Brisbane River and beyond into Moreton Bay through land reclamation. Former commercial wharves and associated on-shore industrial facilities along the Brisbane River are frequently redeveloped into residential and leisure facilities.

While Hamilton Reach has seen a number of such re-developments e.g., Portside and Northshore Hamilton, unlike many other parts of the river, it has retained some commercial shipping activity. The Portside redevelopment combines residential and retail facilities with the cruise liner terminal Portside Wharf. However, increasing, larger cruise liners cannot be accommodated due to a combination of the height restrictions of the Gateway Bridge and the inability to turn the vessels within the river, forcing such ships to use the Port of Brisbane or other industrial wharves downstream. As these alternative wharves lack adequate facilities for leisure travellers, consideration is being given to constructing a new passenger terminal further downstream or elsewhere within Moreton Bay, e.g., on the Gold Coast.

The Cairncross Dockyard was constructed at Hamilton Reach between 1942 and 1944. The facility closed in 2014, and in 2016 the land on which it stands was to be sold for residential and commercial redevelopment.

== Transport ==
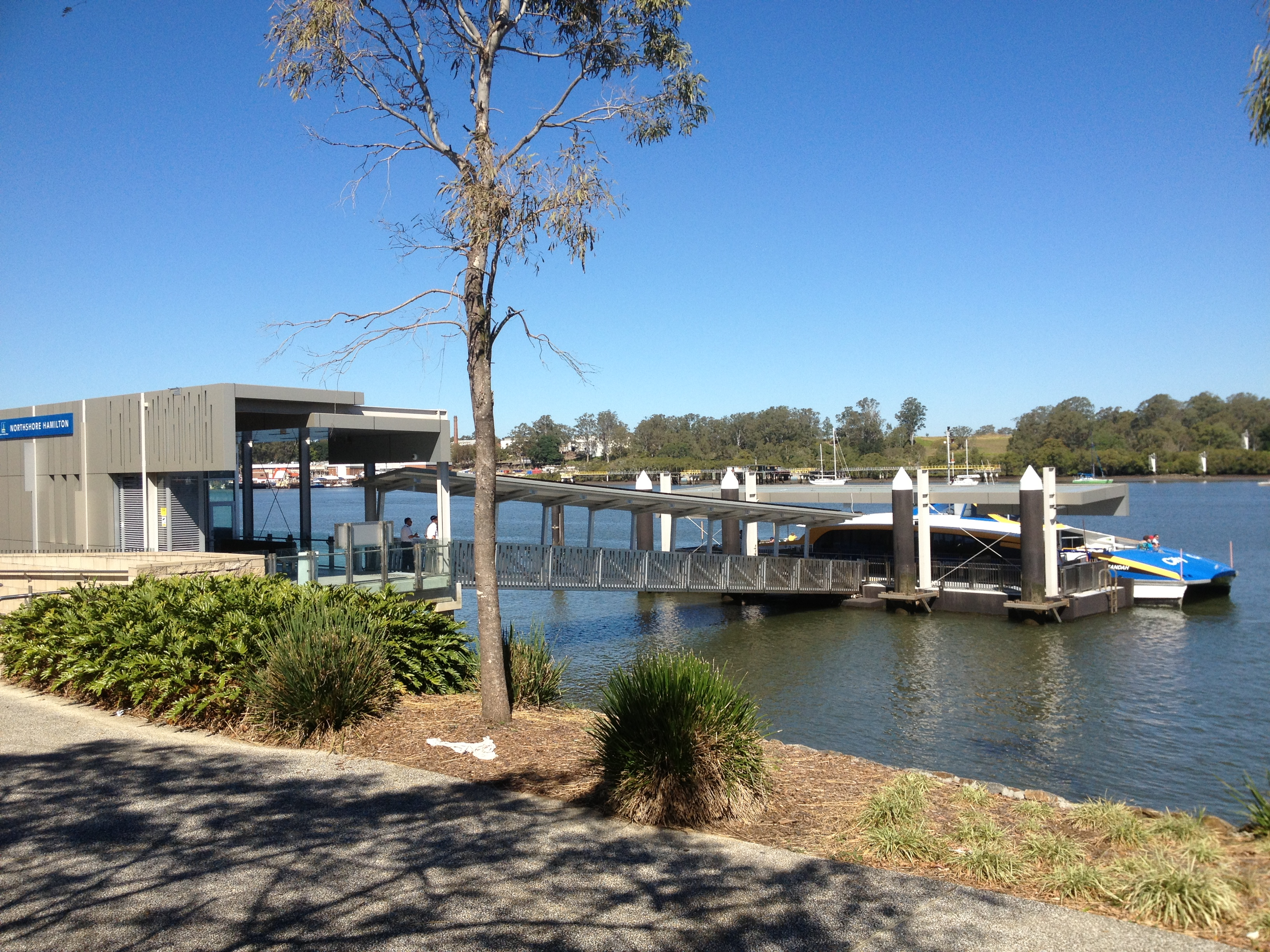
Northshore Hamilton ferry wharf, Queensland 16

There are three ferry terminals on Hamilton Reach (from upstream to downstream):

- Bretts Wharf Ferry Wharf (northern bank)
- Apollo Road ferry wharf (southern bank)
- Northshore Hamilton ferry wharf

All these wharves are on the CityCat route along the Brisbane River with Northshore currently being the most downstream.
