= Kingsford Smith Drive, Brisbane =

Road in Brisbane, Australia

Coordinates: 27°26′23.36″S 153°03′40.58″E

Kingsford Smith Drive Queensland
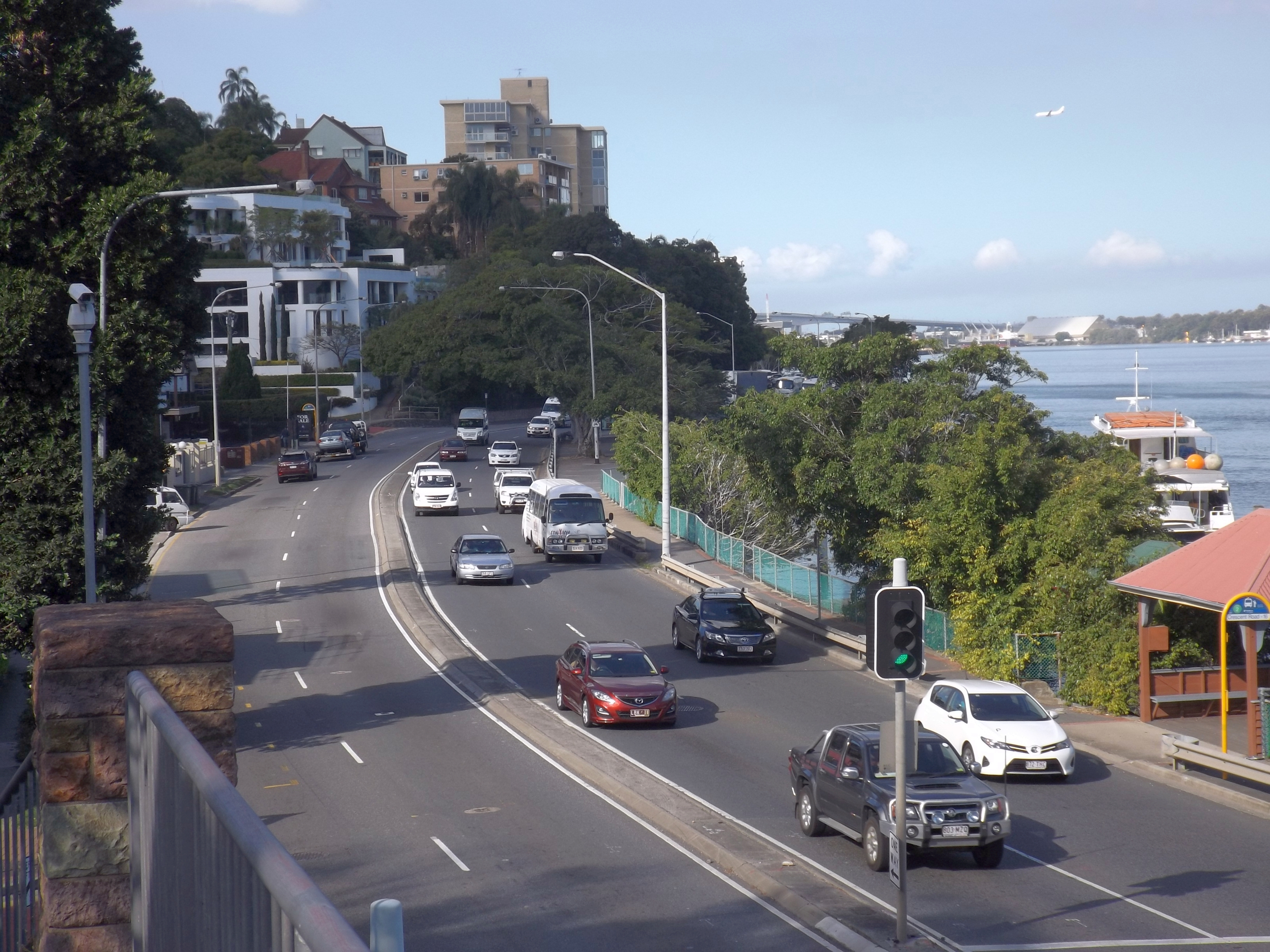
- Kingsford Smith Drive at Hamilton, May 2015

General information
- Type: Road
- Length: 7 km (4.3 mi)
- Route number(s): State Route 25

Major junctions
- Southwest end: Breakfast Creek Road (State Route 25) Albion
- Inner City Bypass; Racecourse Road; Nudgee Road; Southern Cross Way; Links Avenue North; Gateway Motorway (M1)
- Northeast end: Eagle Farm Road (State Route 25) Pinkenba

Location(s)
- Major suburbs: Hamilton, Pinkenba

Kingsford Smith Drive is a major road in Brisbane. The road was named after the aviator Charles Kingsford Smith. It connects the suburb of Pinkenba to the Brisbane central business district at the Breakfast Creek. Kingsford Smith Drive is one of the busiest roads in Brisbane, carrying an average of 61,773 vehicles per day between July and December 2014.

== History ==
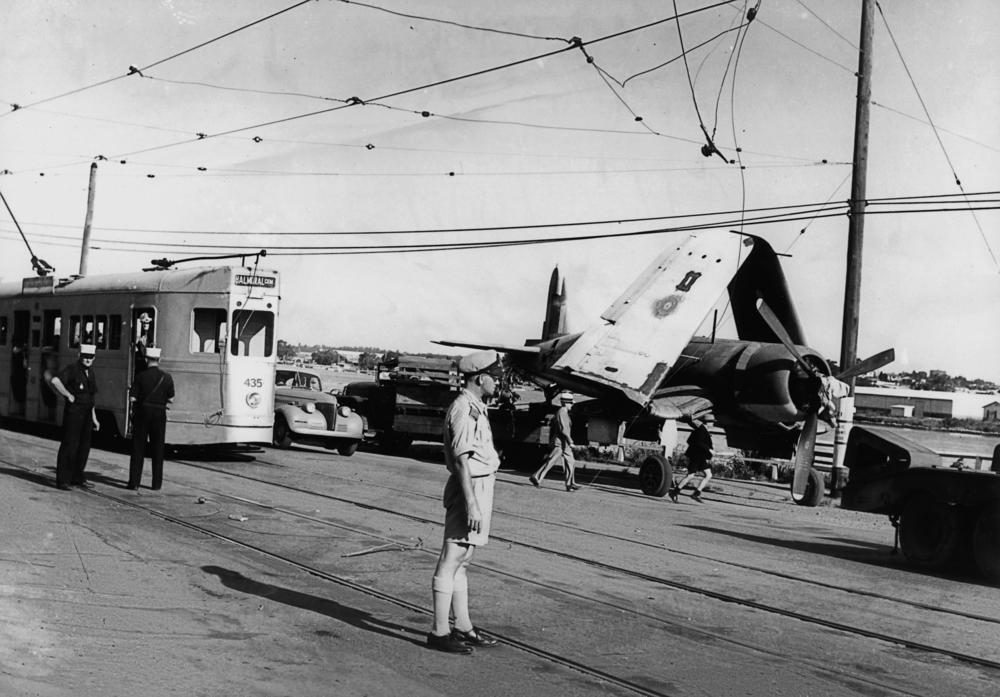
Accident involving a towed plane on Kingsford Smith Drive in c. 1945

The first road along the northern bank of the Brisbane River was constructed in 1829/1830. Convict labour was used to connect the main settlement to the women's gaol at Eagle Farm. In 1882, the road was still no better than a rough bush track.

The road was then known as Hamilton Road in one part and Eagle Farm Road in another part. In 1938, it was renamed Bailey Memorial Avenue in honour of John Frederick Bailey, Queensland Botanist and curator of the Botanic Gardens. However, this name was not used in practice and, in 1953, the road was again renamed after Charles Kingsford Smith although the idea of renaming it had been proposed back in 1938 when the Bailey Memorial Avenue was proposed.

The road was once the major access route to Brisbane's old airport terminals. In 2002 the Inner City Bypass, Brisbane was opened. This bypass allowed traffic joining the Pacific Motorway to avoid the smaller and sometimes congested city streets. In 2016 a major upgrade project was commenced, which completed a year later than scheduled in October 2020.

== Route ==
The route runs along Hamilton Reach of the Brisbane River from Albion via Hamilton, before passing under the Gateway Motorway at Eagle Farm and continuing to Pinkenba. At Hamilton the Kingsford Smith Drive meets Racecourse Road at a T-intersection. During the annual Bridge to Brisbane the road is temporarily closed in one direction.

== Congestion ==
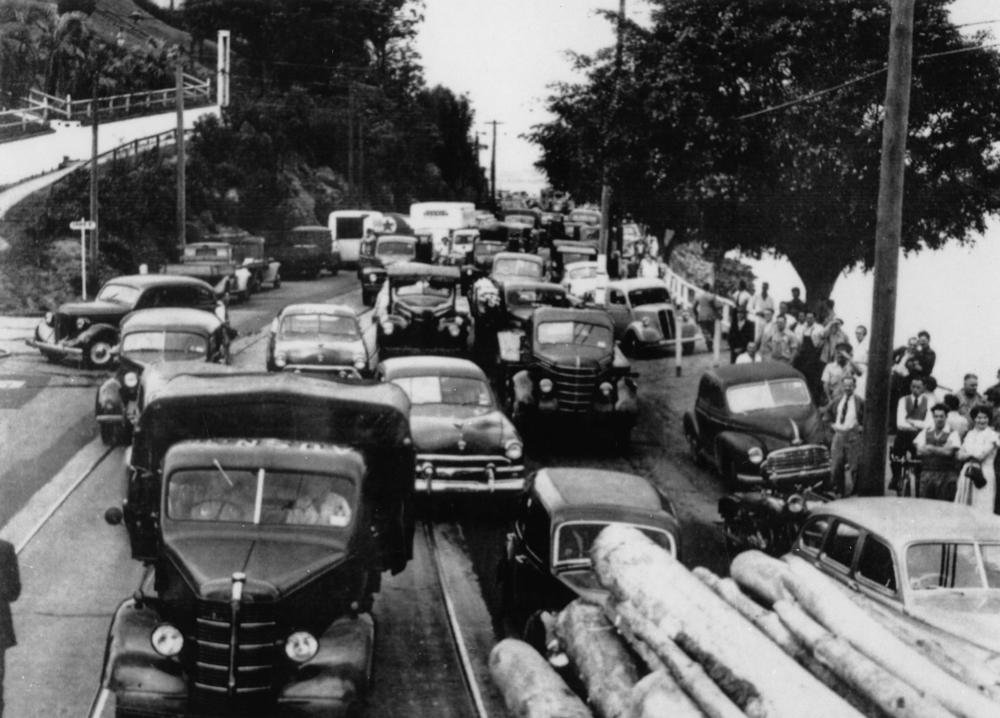
Traffic congestion on Kingsford Smith Drive at Hamilton, 1954

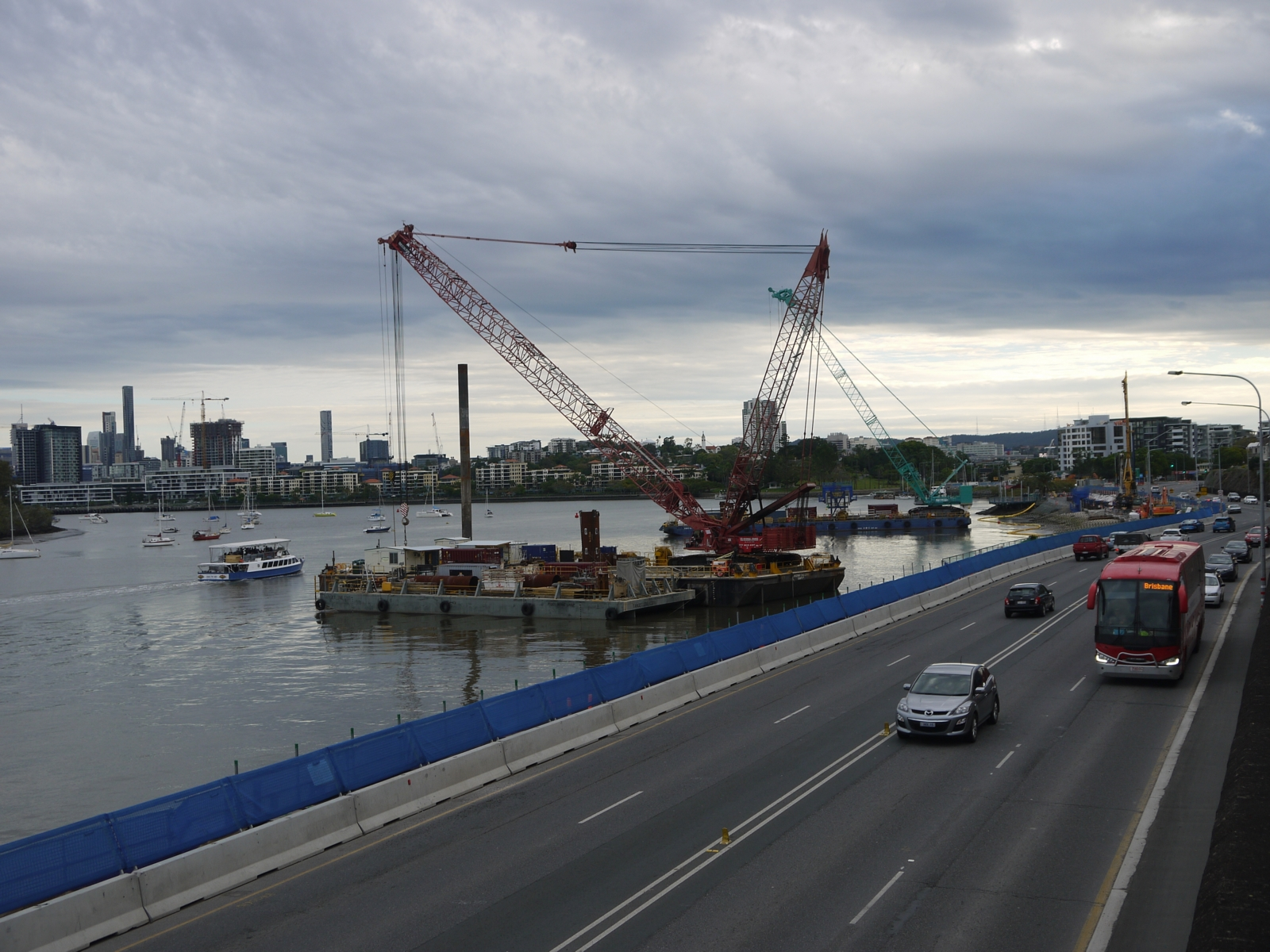
Kingsford Smith Drive Upgrade, Looking west at Crescent Rd in July 2017

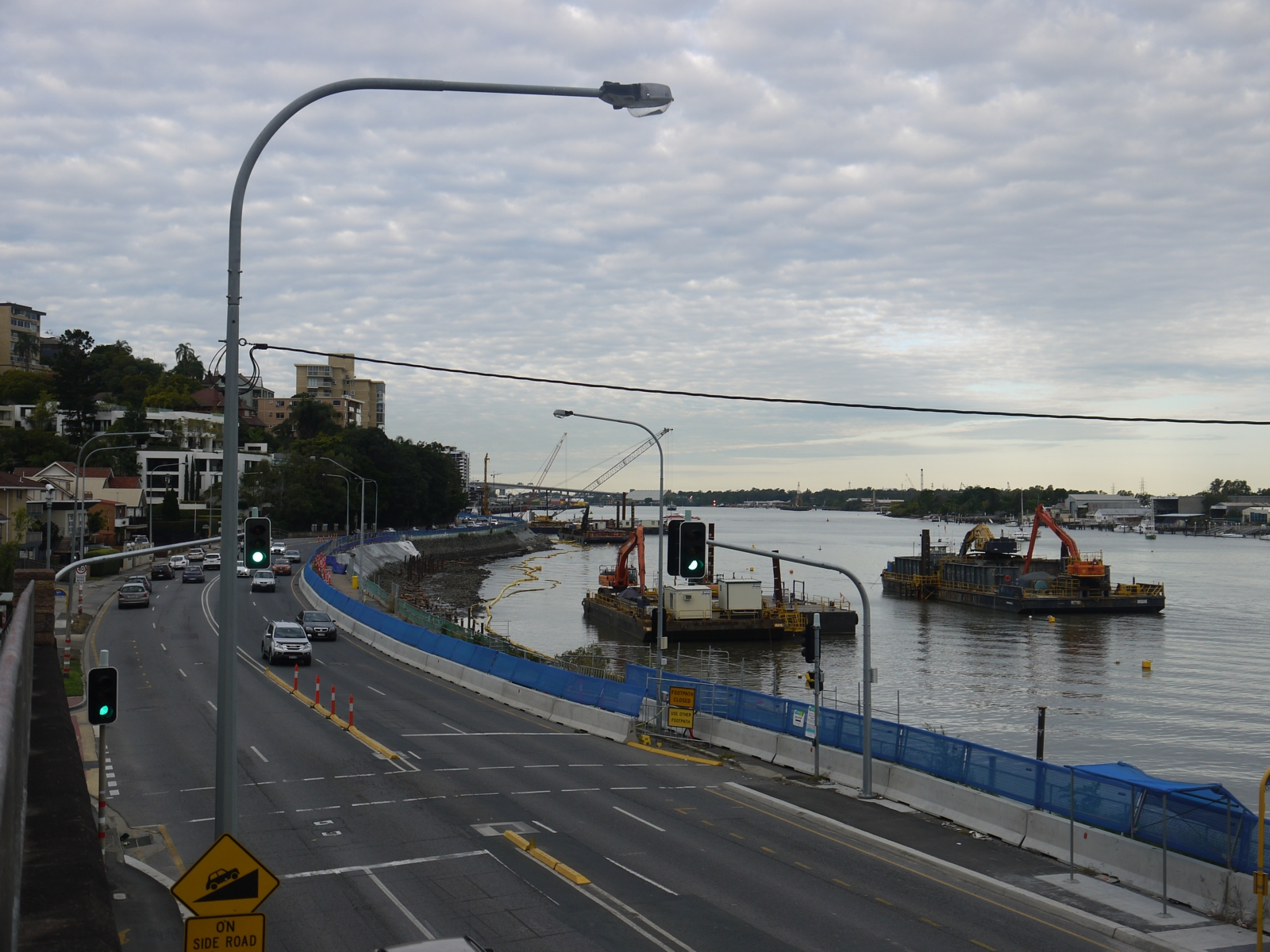
Kingsford Smith Drive Upgrade, Looking east at Crescent Rd in July 2017

In February 2007 it was announced by the Queensland Government that the road was to receive a major upgrade and that traffic rates were estimated at 67,000 vehicles a day. Traffic volumes on the road are increasing. This has led to a drop in the average speed on the road from 45 kilometres (28 mi) per hour in 2008 to 36 kilometres (22 mi) per hour in 2009. The Airport Link tolled tunnel project is expected to reduce traffic volumes by 12%.

== Major intersections ==
The entire road is in the Brisbane local government area.

Location	km	mi	Destinations	Notes
Albion	0	0.0	Breakfast Creek Road (State Route 25) – south – Newstead	Western end of Kingsford Smith Drive (State Route 25)
Albion–Hamilton boundary	0.15	0.093	Inner City Bypass – west – Bowen Hills	No eastbound exit to Inner City Bypass. No westbound entry from Inner City Bypass.
Hamilton	1.9	1.2	Racecourse Road – north – Ascot, Eagle Farm Racecourse	
Hamilton	2.6	1.6	Nudgee Road – north – Ascot, Doomben Racecourse; Remora Road – south – Portside Wharf	
Hamilton	3.8	2.4	Southern Cross Way – north – Hendra	No entry from Southern Cross Way. No exit to Southern Cross Way southbound.
Hamilton	4.4	2.7	Links Avenue North – south – Southern Cross Way; Schneider Road – north – Australia TradeCoast	
Hamilton	4.9	3.0	Gateway Motorway – south – Sir Leo Hielscher Bridges	No exit to Gateway Motorway northbound. No entry from Gateway Motorway southbound.
Pinkenba	7.0	4.3	Eagle Farm Road (State Route 25) – north–east – Pinkenba	Eastern end of Kingsford Smith Drive. State Route 25 continues north–east as Eagle Farm Road.
1.000 mi = 1.609 km; 1.000 km = 0.621 mi: Incomplete access

== See also ==
- Gympie Road
- Sandgate Road
- Transport in Brisbane
