= Riverside ferry wharf =

Ferry wharf in Brisbane

Riverside
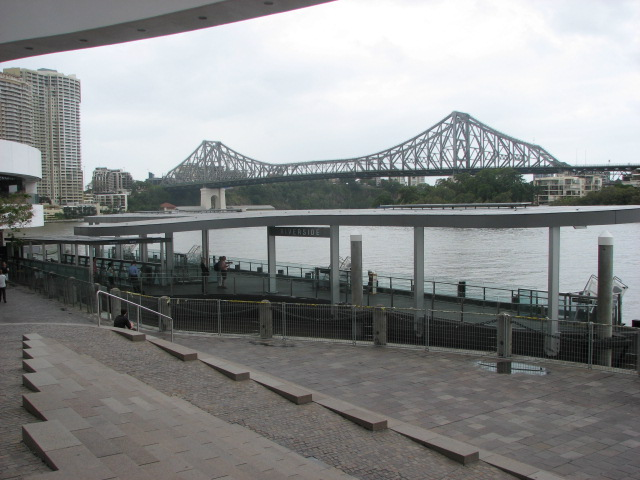

General information
- Location: Eagle Street, Brisbane CBD
- Coordinates: 27°28′01″S 153°01′53″E
- Owner: Brisbane City Council
- Operator: RiverCity Ferries
- Platforms: 1

Construction
- Accessible: Yes

Other information
- Station code: 317590
- Fare zone: go card 1

Services
Preceding wharf	RiverCity Ferries	Following wharf
QUT Gardens Point towards UQ St Lucia	CityCat	Sydney Street towards Northshore Hamilton
Maritime Museum towards North Quay	CityHopper	Holman Street towards Sydney Street
Howard Smith Wharves Terminus	Cross River Ferries–Kangaroo Point	Holman Street Terminus
Location

Riverside ferry wharf is located on the northern side of the Brisbane River serving the Brisbane central business district in Queensland, Australia. It is served by RiverCity Ferries' CityCat services. From 15 November 2020 it is also being served by CityHopper and Cross River services.

== Location ==
It is adjacent to the Riverside Centre.

== History ==
The wharf sustained moderate damage during the January 2011 Brisbane floods. It reopened after repairs on 14 February 2011.
