= Dockside ferry wharf =

Ferry wharf in Brisbane

Dockside
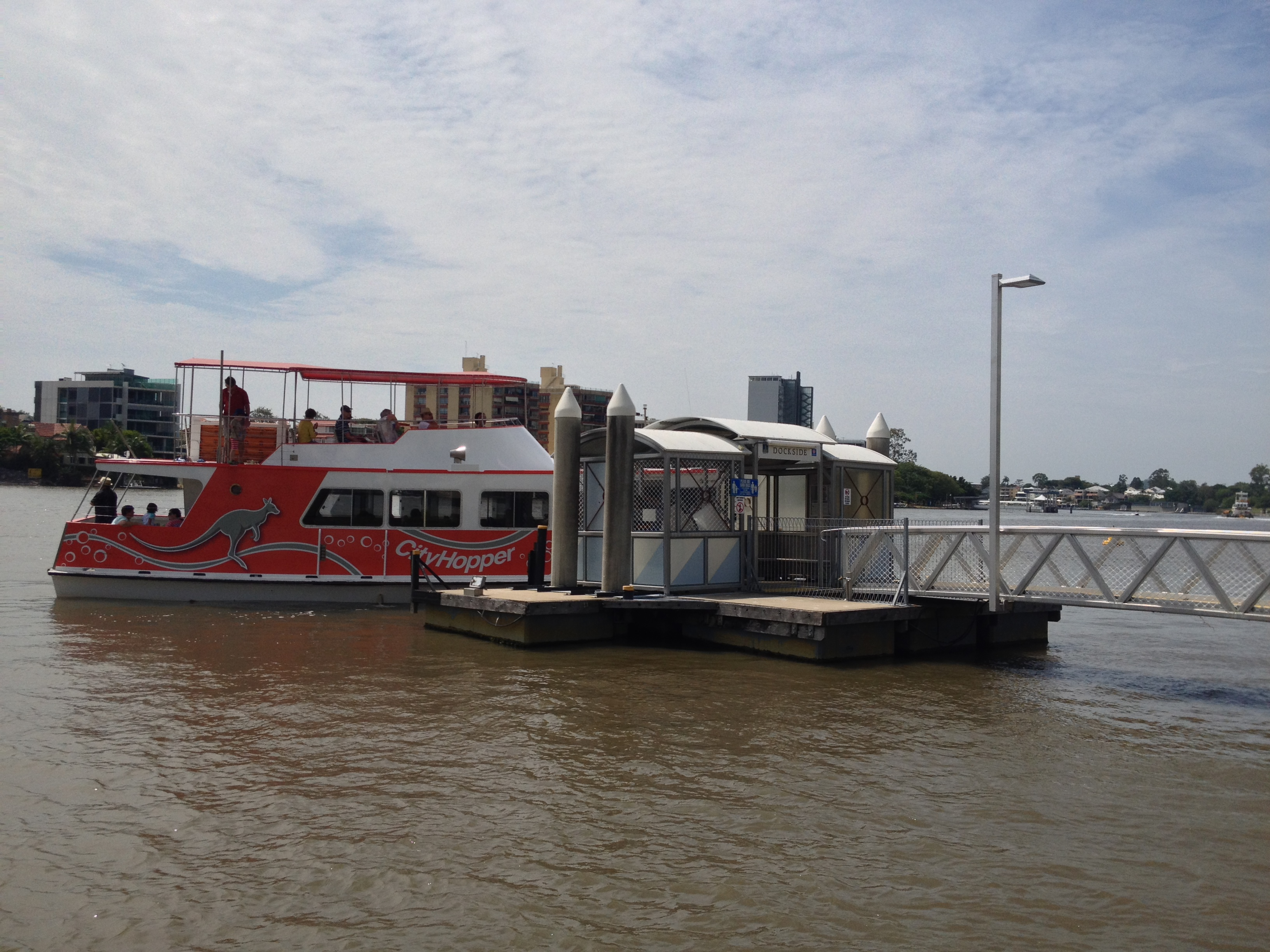

General information
- Location: Cairns Street, Kangaroo Point; Australia
- Coordinates: 27°28′21″S 153°02′20″E
- Owner: Brisbane City Council
- Operator: Transdev Brisbane Ferries
- Platforms: 1

Construction
- Accessible: Yes

Other information
- Station code: 317581
- Fare zone: go card 1

Services
Preceding wharf	RiverCity Ferries	Following wharf
Former services
Holman Street towards North Quay	CityHopper	Sydney Street Terminus
Location

Dockside ferry wharf was located on the southern side of the Brisbane River serving the Brisbane suburb of Kangaroo Point in Queensland, Australia. It was served by Transdev Brisbane Ferries' CityHopper services. These services were suspended in July 2020 and formally cancelled to stop at this wharf in October 2020.

== History ==
The wharf sustained minor damage during the January 2011 Brisbane floods. It reopened after repairs on 14 February 2011.
