= Milton ferry wharf =

Milton
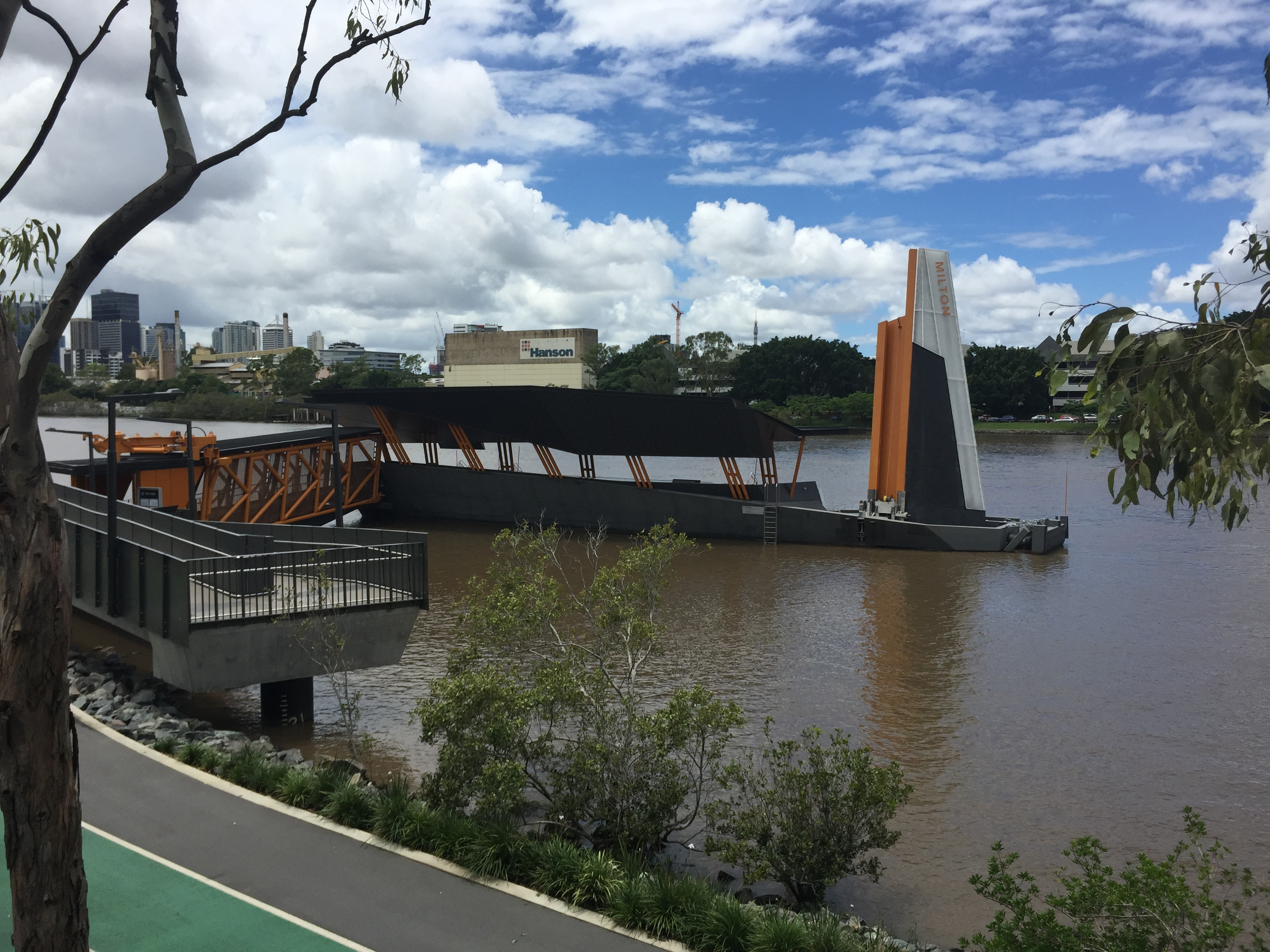

General information
- Location: Coronation Drive, Milton
- Owner: Brisbane City Council
- Operator: RiverCity Ferries
- Platforms: 2

Construction
- Accessible: Yes

Other information
- Station code: 319586
- Fare zone: go card 1

History
- Opened: 18 January 2015

Services
Preceding wharf	RiverCity Ferries	Following wharf
Regatta towards UQ St Lucia	CityCat	North Quay towards Northshore Hamilton
Location

Milton ferry wharf is located on the northern side of the Brisbane River serving the Brisbane suburb of Milton in Queensland, Australia. It is served by RiverCity Ferries' CityCat services.

== Description ==
The wharf is located adjacent to Park Road and Coronation Drive intersection. It consists of a single pier that ends with a pontoon with two berths and covered passenger waiting area with seating.

== History ==
Construction commenced in June 2014 with the wharf opening on 18 January 2015.
