= Guyatt Park ferry wharf =

Ferry stop in Queensland, Australia

Guyatt Park
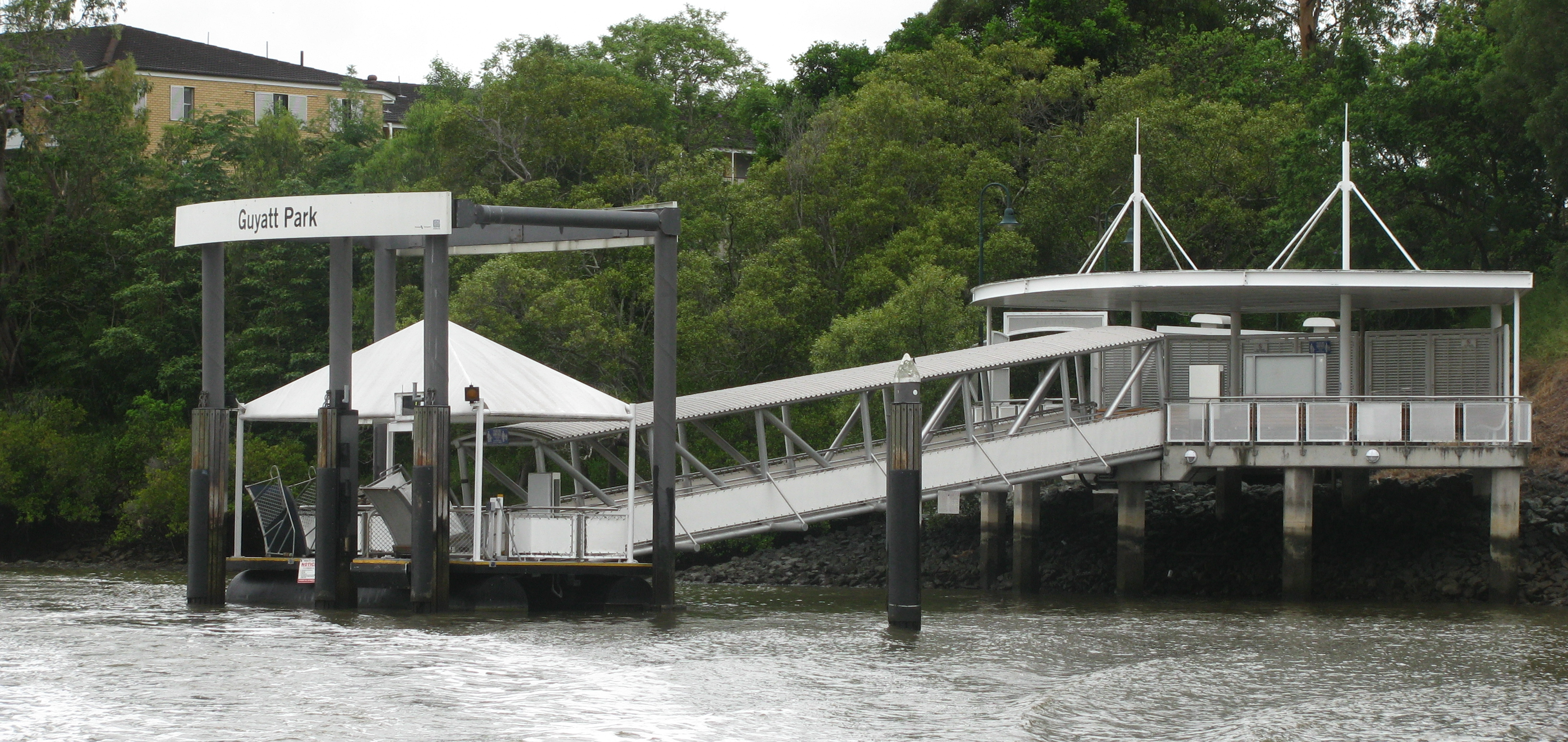

General information
- Location: Hiron Street, St Lucia; Australia
- Coordinates: 27°29′33″S 153°00′07″E
- Owner: Brisbane City Council
- Operator: RiverCity Ferries
- Platforms: 1

Construction
- Accessible: Yes

Other information
- Station code: 317572
- Fare zone: go card 1

Services
Preceding wharf	RiverCity Ferries	Following wharf
West End towards UQ St Lucia	CityCat	Regatta towards Northshore Hamilton
Location

Guyatt Park ferry wharf is located on the northern side of the Brisbane River serving the Brisbane suburb of St Lucia in Queensland, Australia. It is served by RiverCity Ferries' CityCat services.

== Description ==
This wharf comprises a single long pier that ends in a pontoon with two docking stations. However, only one of them is used at a time due to size constraints. This terminal has a covered passenger waiting area with a Telstra pay phone and a drinking water fountain. It takes its name from the adjacent Guyatt Park.

== History ==
The wharf sustained moderate damage during the January 2011 Brisbane floods. It reopened after repairs on 14 February 2011.
