= Mowbray Park ferry wharf =

Mowbray Park
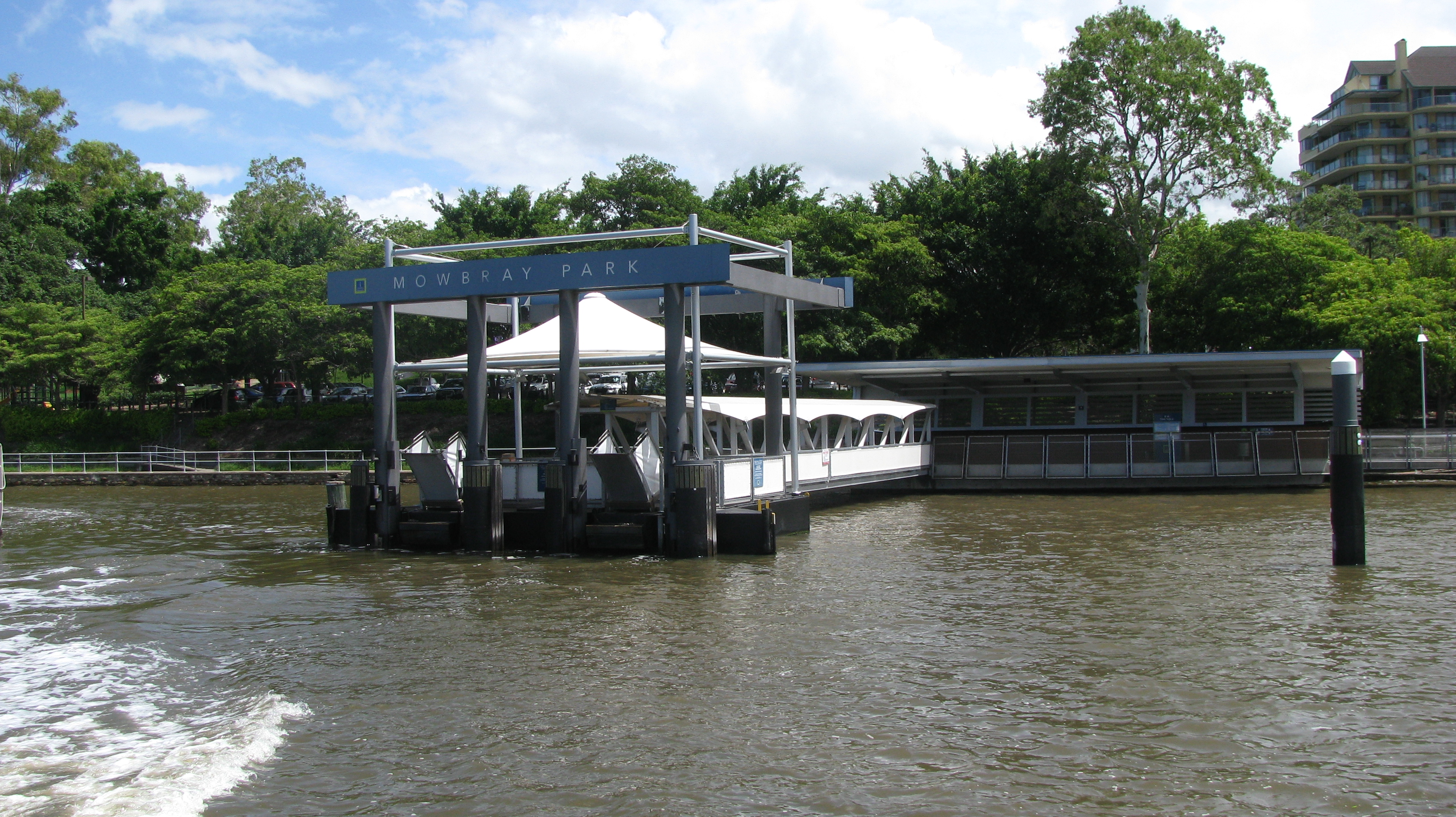

General information
- Location: Park Avenue, East Brisbane; Australia
- Coordinates: 27°28′39″S 153°02′35″E
- Owner: Brisbane City Council
- Operator: RiverCity Ferries
- Platforms: 1

Construction
- Accessible: Yes

Other information
- Station code: 317582
- Fare zone: go card 1

Services
Preceding wharf	RiverCity Ferries	Following wharf
Sydney Street towards UQ St Lucia	CityCat	New Farm Park towards Northshore Hamilton
Location

Mowbray Park ferry wharf is located on the southern side of the Brisbane River serving the Brisbane suburb of East Brisbane in Queensland, Australia. It is served by RiverCity Ferries' CityCat services.

== History ==
Mowbray Park is named for Thomas Mowbray, a presbyterian minister who had been minister at the now heritage-listed Mowbraytown Presbyterian Church in the East Brisbane area (and formerly of the Blackridge Parish Church, Scotland).

The wharf sustained moderate damage during the January 2011 Brisbane floods. It reopened after repairs on 14 February 2011. It closed down in early April 2024 for a major upgrade and reopened in December 2024.
