= Regatta ferry wharf =

Ferry wharf in Toowong, Brisbane, Australia

Regatta
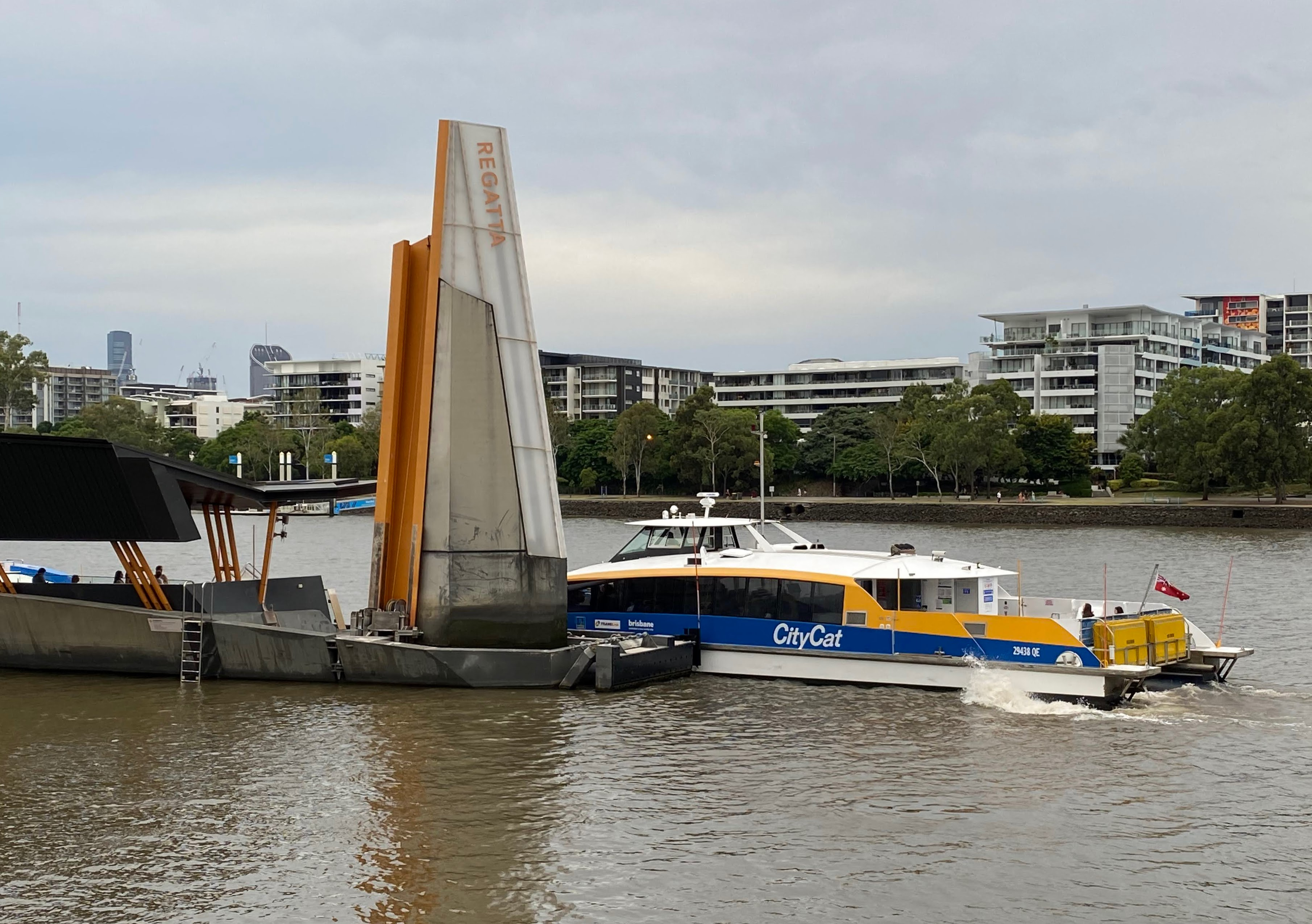
- Regatta ferry wharf in 2023

General information
- Location: Coronation Drive, Toowong; Australia
- Coordinates: 27°29′00″S 152°59′49″E
- Owner: Brisbane City Council
- Operator: RiverCity Ferries
- Platforms: 2

Construction
- Accessible: Yes

Other information
- Station code: 317571
- Fare zone: go card 1

History
- Opened: 7 April 2003
- Closed: 20 October 2014
- Rebuilt: 25 March 2015

Services
Preceding wharf	RiverCity Ferries	Following wharf
Guyatt Park towards UQ St Lucia	CityCat	Milton towards Northshore Hamilton
Location

Regatta ferry wharf is located on the northern side of the Brisbane River serving the Brisbane suburb of Toowong in Queensland, Australia. It is served by RiverCity Ferries' CityCat services.

== History ==
Regatta wharf opened on 4 July 2003, with the Regatta Hotel contributing $1 million and the Brisbane City Council $500,000 to its construction.

The wharf sustained damage during the January 2011 Brisbane floods. Initially repair work was expected to take up to 18 months, but a survey by engineers showed that the timber access boardwalk, concrete waiting area and steel roof were intact, along with the mooring piles. The floating pontoon was full of water (due to overtopping into the access hatches on the deck), but was still connected to the mooring piles down on the river bed, and was recovered and refloated. A new aluminium gangway was fabricated, and the wharf reopened on 18 April 2011, three months after the flood event.

In October 2014, the wharf closed for an upgrade. The current terminal opened on 25 March 2015.
