= RiverCity Ferries =

Ferry operator in Brisbane, Australia

- Industry: Public transport
- Predecessor: Transdev Brisbane Ferries
- Founded: 4 November 2020
- Headquarters: Brisbane, Australia
- Area served: Brisbane River
- Products: CityCat; KittyCat
- Services: Passenger ferry transport
- Parent: Kelsian Group
- Website: rivercityferries.com.au

RiverCity Ferries is a public transport company which commenced operating ferry services in Brisbane on 4 November 2020. It is a subsidiary of the Kelsian Group.

RiverCity Ferries operates 36 vessels serving 22 wharves on the Brisbane River under a ten-year contract (with an optional five-year extension) with the Brisbane City Council. The company won the contract from the previous operator, Transdev Brisbane Ferries.

== Services ==
=== CityCat ===
CityCat services began operating in November 1996 with a fleet of six high-speed catamarans. The service proved very popular with more than five million trips taken by 2004.

CityCat services operate from UQ St Lucia to Northshore Hamilton calling at West End, Guyatt Park, Regatta, Milton, North Quay, South Bank, QUT Gardens Point, Riverside, Howard Smith Wharves, Sydney Street, Mowbray Park, New Farm Park, Hawthorne, Bulimba, Teneriffe, Bretts Wharf and Apollo Road. Not all CityCat services stop all stops, with some peak time express services operating.

=== KittyCat ===
KittyCat services operate cross-river between the following locations:

- Bulimba – Teneriffe
- Sydney Street – Dockside
- Holman Street – Riverside
- Maritime Museum – QUT Gardens Point

== Fleet ==
RiverCity Ferries's fleet consists of 27 CityCats and 5 KittyCats. The CityCats are owned by Brisbane City Council. The KittyCats are leased from Captain Cook Cruises.

=== CityCats ===
The CityCat vessels are catamarans, and named after the Aboriginal place names for various parts of the Brisbane River and adjacent areas (with the exception of the 19th CityCat, the Spirit of Brisbane, which honours the 2011 flood recovery volunteers).

==== First generation ====
First generation CityCats have a capacity of 149 passengers. These are to be replaced by additional fourth generation vessels.

Name	MMSI	Call sign	Builder	Launched	Withdrawn	Namesake	Reference	Wrap Theme	Image
Kurilpa	503575300	11930QE	Brisbane Ship Constructions	November 1996	June 2026	West End		Brisbane City Council's corporate colours of blue, yellow and white	Kurilpa
Mirbarpa	503575600	12012QE	Brisbane Ship Constructions	November 1996		Indooroopilly		Brisbane City Council's corporate colours of blue, yellow and white	
Barrambin	503575500	12013QE	Brisbane Ship Constructions	November 1996	January 2021	Breakfast Creek		Commemoration of 20 Years of CityCat services	
Tugulawa	503575400	12014QE	Brisbane Ship Constructions	November 1996		Bulimba		Brisbane City Council's corporate colours of blue, yellow and white	
Mianjin	503575800	12132QE	Brisbane Ship Constructions	December 1996	January 2021	Gardens Point		Brisbane City Council's corporate colours of blue, yellow and white	
Binkinba	503575700	12133QE	Brisbane Ship Constructions	December 1996		New Farm		Brisbane Bullets basketball team	Binkinba
Mooroolbin	503575900	20481QE	Brisbane Ship Constructions	October 1998		Hamilton Sandbank		Brisbane City Council's corporate colours of blue, yellow and white	
Baneraba	503576100	20854QE	Brisbane Ship Constructions	December 1998		Toowong		Brisbane City Council's corporate colours of blue, yellow and white	

==== Second generation ====
Second generation CityCats have a capacity of 162 passengers.

Name	MMSI	Call sign	Builder	Launched	Withdrawn	Namesake	Reference	Wrap Theme	Image
Beenung-urrung	503576200	26483QE	Norman R Wright & Sons	August 2004	1 March 2022; Sunk during the 2022 eastern Australia floods	Highgate Hill		Brisbane Lions AFL team	
Tunamun	503576300	26579QE	Norman R Wright & Sons	June 2005		Petrie Bight		Brisbane City Council's corporate colours of blue, yellow and white	
Meeandah	503576400	28744QE	Norman R Wright & Sons	February 2008		Meeandah		Brisbane City Council's corporate colours of blue, yellow and white	
Wilwinpa	503576500	27884QE	Norman R Wright & Sons	June 2008		Old Observatory		Brisbane City Council's corporate colours of blue, yellow and white	
Ya-wa-gara	503576600	27885QE	Norman R Wright & Sons	November 2008		Breakfast Creek		Brisbane City Council's corporate colours of blue, yellow and white	
Mahreel	503576700	28922QE	Norman R Wright & Sons	April 2009		Spring Hill		Brisbane City Council's corporate colours of blue, yellow and white	

==== Third generation ====
Third generation CityCats have a capacity of 162 passengers.

Name	MMSI	Call sign	Builder	Launched	Namesake	Reference	Wrap Theme	Image
Kuluwin	503576800	29438QE	Norman R Wright & Sons	February 2010	Wooloowin		Brisbane City Council's corporate colours of blue, yellow and white	
Gootcha	503576900	29440QE	Norman R Wright & Sons	July 2010	Toowong		Brisbane City Council's corporate colours of blue, yellow and white	
Walan	503577100	29439QE	Norman R Wright & Sons	December 2010	Herston		Brisbane City Council's corporate colours of blue, yellow and white	
Mudherri	503577200	29437QE	Norman R Wright & Sons	July 2011	Murarrie		Brisbane City Council's corporate colours of blue, yellow and white	Mudherri
Spirit of Brisbane	503586200	29436QE	Norman R Wright & Sons	October 2011			Brisbane City Council's corporate colours of blue, yellow and white	Spirit of Brisbane
Nar-Dha	503017210	A3K0202	Norman R Wright & Sons	November 2014	Nudgee		Brisbane City Council's corporate colours of blue, yellow and white	
Gilwunpa	503025670	32038QE	Norman R Wright & Sons	June 2015	Nundah		Brisbane City Council's corporate colours of blue, yellow and white	

==== Fourth generation ====
Ten fourth generation CityCats were delivered from late 2019. They have a capacity of 170 passengers, including 20 on an open upper deck, plus more space for wheelchairs and bicycles than earlier generations. The vessels each cost $3.7 million, and were constructed at Murarrie by Aus Ships Group.

In December 2019, Brisbane City Council awarded Aus Ships Group a contract for an additional six fourth generation CityCats to replace the first generation vessels at a cost of $3.73 million each.

Name	MMSI	Call sign	Builder	Launched	Namesake	Reference	Image
Yoogera	503092890	456106	Aus Ships	October 2019	Mouth of Breakfast Creek		
Neville Bonner	503102970	457882	Aus Ships	August 2020	Neville Bonner		
Mianjin II	503110450	458416	Aus Ships	May 2021	Gardens Point		
Barrambin II	503121140	458624	Aus Ships		Breakfast Creek		
Mooroolbin II	503131370	459861	Aus Ships	May 2022	Hamilton Sandbank		
Kurilpa II	503138850	459862	Aus Ships	December 2022	West End		
Binkinba II	503149810	461419	Aus Ships	July 2023	New Farm (Place of the land tortoise)		
Tugulawa II	503162010	461417	Aus Ships	April 2024	Bulimba		
Baneraba II	503178760	464282	Aus Ships	March 2025	Toowong		
Mirbarpa II	503188570	464908	Aus Ships		Indooroopilly		

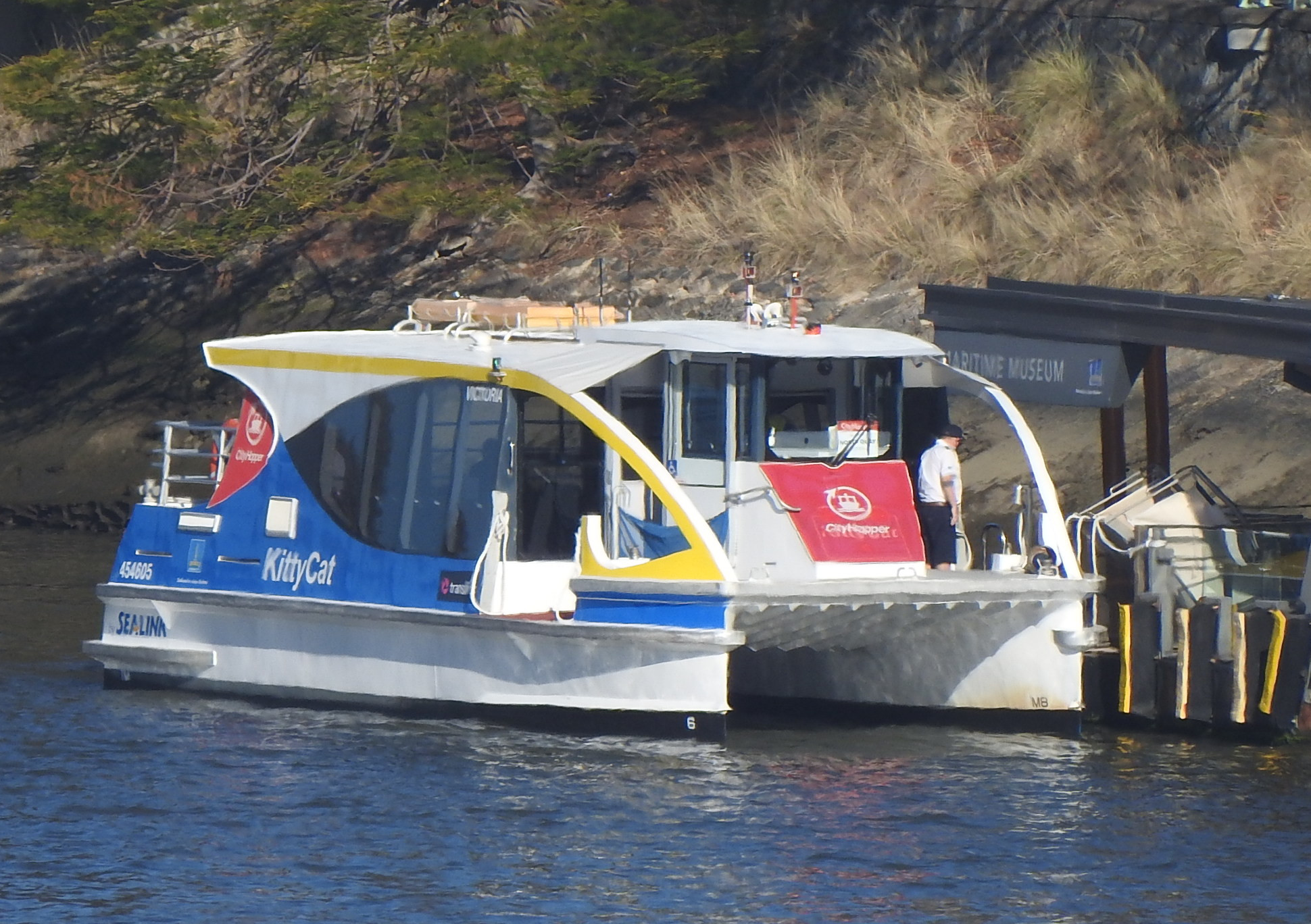
KittyKat 'Victoria' (September 2021)

=== KittyCats ===
Five 12 m (39 ft) catamarans, nicknamed KittyCats, have been leased from RiverCity Ferries sister company Captain Cook Cruises in Sydney since November 2020 to operate the cross river services after the monohulled ferries were withdrawn. The first, MV Cockle Bay, arrived in Brisbane in September 2020. They have a capacity of 60 passengers (36 seated, 24 standing) and are operated by a crew of one. They are powered by 2 x 184 kW (247 hp) Cummins QSB engines with an economical normal service speed of 18 knots (33 km/h; 21 mph) and a maximum speed of 24 knots (44 km/h; 28 mph).

Residents have expressed concerns with the noise of the new vessels, since they came into service. In May 2021, Council ordered SeaLink to fit mufflers to the vessels to reduce noise concerns.

Name	MMSI	Call sign	Builder	Launched	Former name	Image
Victoria	503047610	454605	Richardson Devine Marine	2017	Cockle Bay	
Taylor	503047620	444165	Richardson Devine Marine	2017	Blackwattle Bay	
Albert	503076850	455645	Harwood Marine	2018	White Bay	
Melany	503076860	455653	Harwood Marine	2018	Pyrmont Bay	
Eleanor		452393				

=== EVCats ===
A prototype electric ferry, to be called the EVCat, was announced by Brisbane Lord Mayor Adrian Schrinner on 14 June 2023. Development would be funded by Brisbane City Council and developed jointly with River City Ferries and Aus Ships. The proposed prototype would be 15 metres (49 ft) long and carry 50 passengers, larger than the KittyCats but smaller than the CityCats.

== Former fleet ==
=== Monohull ferries ===
The monohulled ferries worked the inner city CityHopper and cross-river CityFerry services. All units were suspended from service in July 2020 following the discovery of rotten wood in their hulls and later replaced by KittyCats. Restoration of these ferries was mooted but later abandoned due to cost and their 30+ year age; they were auctioned off in August 2022.

==== CityHopper ====
These were powered by 134 kW (180 hp) Scania engines, with a maximum speed of 12 knots (22 km/h; 14 mph) and were operated by a crew of one. From 28 January 2025, Brisbane's free CityHopper service ended. Cross River 'KittyCat' services now operate with standard $0.50 Translink fares.

Name	Call sign	Builder	Launched	Namesake	Passengers	Image
Mermaid	4372QEC	Norman Park Boat Builders	1988	HMS Mermaid (1817), ship used by John Oxley who explored the Brisbane River in December 1823	78	
Doomba	4902QE	Norman R Wright & Sons	1989	SS Doomba	78	
Otter	4908QE	Norman R Wright & Sons	1989	HMQS Otter	78	

==== CityFerry ====
These were powered by 86 kW (115 hp) Perkins engines, with a maximum speed of 10 knots (19 km/h; 12 mph) and were operated by a crew of one.

Name	Call sign	Builder	Launched	Namesake	Passengers	Image
Bulimba	959QE	Norman R Wright & Sons	1984	Bulimba	47	
Lucinda	1185QE	Norman Park Boat Builders	1986	Lucinda	47	
Koopa	1124QE	Norman Park Boat Builders	1986	SS Koopa, the Bribie Island ferry from 1912 to 1963	47	
Gayundah	1283QE	Norman Park Boat Builders	1986	HMQS Gayundah	47	
John Oxley	6950QE	Norman R Wright & Sons	1990	John Oxley	47	
Kalparrin	9570QE	Queensland Port Services	1993	An Aboriginal word meaning "to help carry a load"	47	

== Network ==
The wharves are listed in geographical order, heading upstream along the Brisbane River.

Wharves	Stopping Pattern SC = SpeedyCat CC = CityCat KC = KittyCat			Connections
Wharves	SC	CC	KC	Connections
Northshore Hamilton		●		Bus transport
Apollo Road	●	●		Bus transport
Bretts Wharf	●	●		Bus transport
Bulimba	●	●	●	Bus transport
Teneriffe		●	●	Blue CityGlider
Hawthorne	●	●		Bus transport
New Farm Park		●		
Mowbray Park		●		
Sydney Street		●	●	
Dockside			●	
Howard Smith Wharves		●		
Holman Street			●	
Riverside	●	●	●	
Maritime Museum			●	
QUT Gardens Point	●	●	●	
South Bank		●		
North Quay	●	●		
Milton	●	●		Bus transport
Regatta	●	●		Bus transport
Guyatt Park	●	●		
West End	●	●		Blue CityGlider
UQ St Lucia		●		

== See also ==
- Transport in Brisbane
- Transport for Brisbane
