= Howard Smith Wharves =

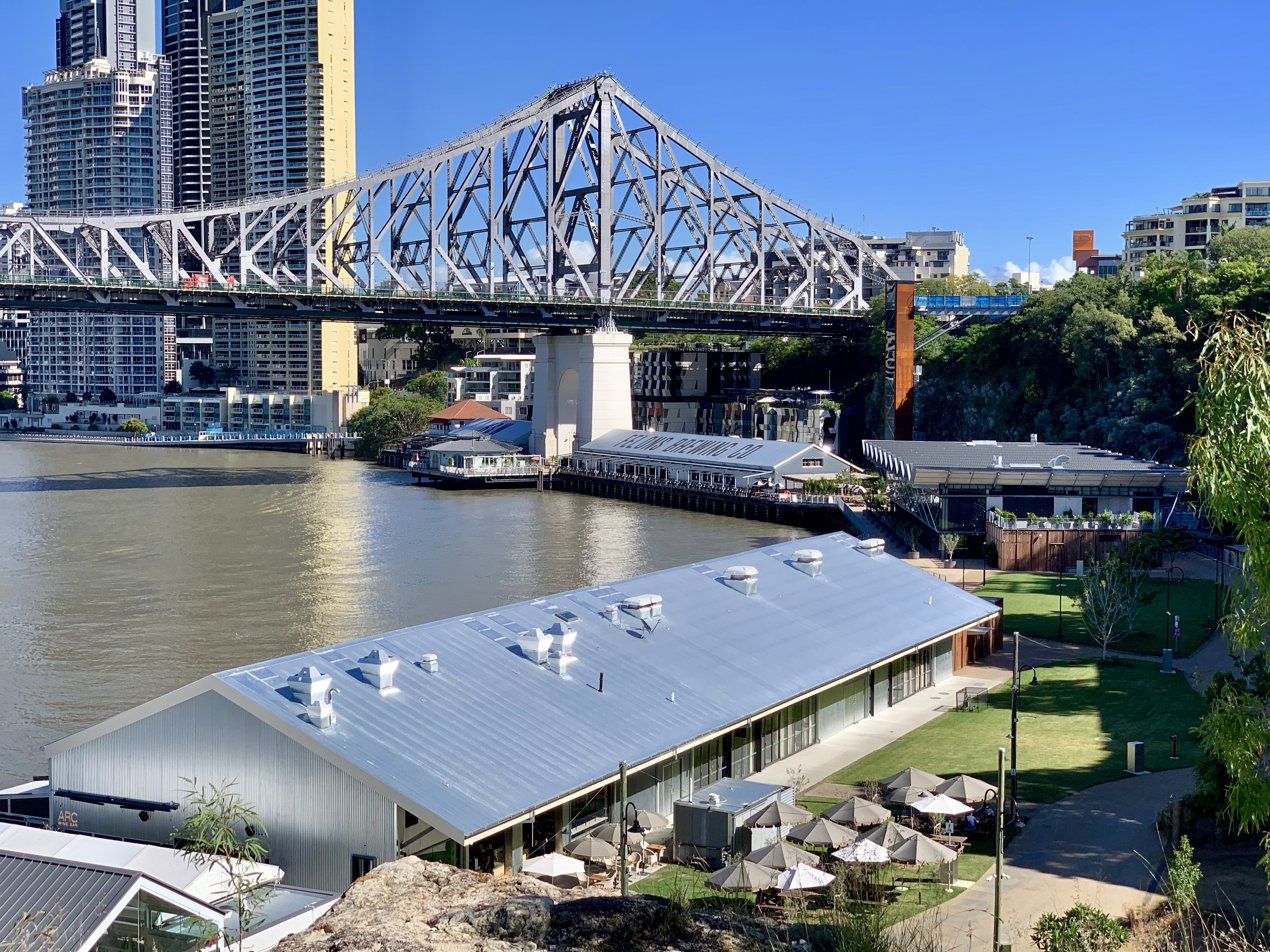
- Howard Smith Wharves, 2019

- Location within Queensland
- 27.463°S 153.0369°E
- Location: Boundary Street, Brisbane City and Fortitude Valley, City of Brisbane, Queensland, Australia

History
- Design period: 1919–1930s (interwar period)
- Built: c. 1934–1940s circa

Queensland Heritage Register
- Official name: Howard Smith Wharves, Brisbane Central Wharves
- Type: state heritage (landscape, built)
- Designated: 4 February 1997
- Reference no.: 601781
- Significant period: c. 1935–1960s (historical); 1930s–1940s (fabric)
- Significant components: wharf/dock/quay, views to, bridge/viaduct – road, natural feature – cliff, pylon/s, air raid shelter, pile/s, shed – storage, views from, docking/loading facility, office/administration building

Howard Smith Wharves

General information
- Location: Fortitude Valley; Australia
- Owner: Brisbane City Council
- Operator: RiverCity Ferries
- Platforms: 1

Construction
- Accessible: Yes

Other information
- Station code: 321208
- Fare zone: go card 1

History
- Opened: 2020

Services
Preceding wharf	RiverCity Ferries	Following wharf
Holman Street towards North Quay	CityHopper	Sydney Street Terminus
Terminus	Cross River Ferries–Kangaroo Point	Riverside towards Holman Street
Location

Howard Smith Wharves is a heritage-listed wharf on the Brisbane River beneath Bowen Terrace in Brisbane City and Fortitude Valley, Queensland, Australia. It was built from 1939 to 1942, and was known as Brisbane Central Wharves. The 3.5-hectare (8.6-acre) site is one of the most culturally and historically significant riverfront locations in Brisbane. It was added to the Queensland Heritage Register on 4 February 1997.

In 2009, Brisbane City Council proposed an extensive commercial development of the site that included hotel, sport and entertainment facilities in new or refurbished old buildings. This plan was rejected by the local community which resulted in a revised plan incorporating greater public space and less commercial development. The revised plan was then rejected by the Queensland Government over concerns with flooding.

In 2013, Brisbane City Council again requested proposals from interested parties to redevelop the site. In 2014, a preferred candidate was named, and in 2015, a development application for the design was approved. This new redeveloped site was opened in late 2018.

A new ferry terminal on the RiverCity Ferries network opened at the site in 2020. It is served by CityHopper ferry services and Cross River ferry services to Holman Street.

== History ==
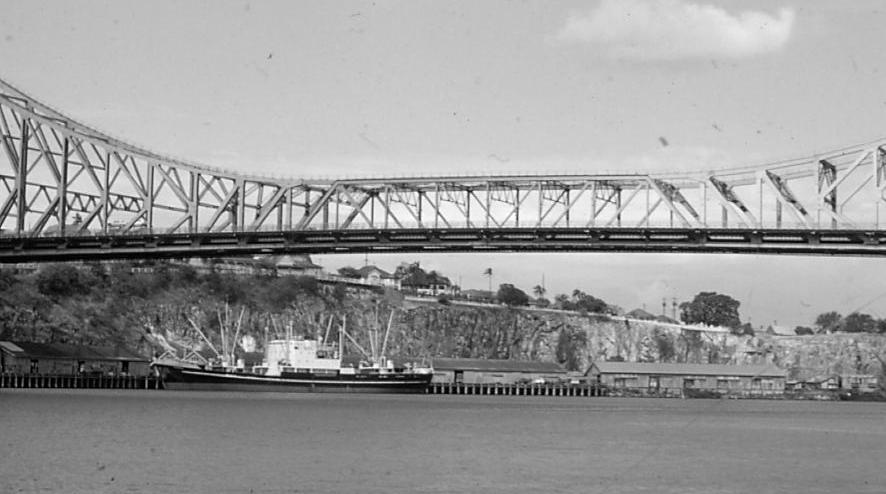
The Wharves in 1958

The Howard Smith Wharves were constructed over 3 years from 1939 by the Queensland Government to provide relief work during the depression era. Initially known as the Brisbane Central Wharves, the project was undertaken in conjunction with the construction of the Story Bridge, one of the Forgan-Smith government's principal employment-generating projects. Like other such schemes, the Brisbane Central Wharves not only provided employment, but established important infrastructure for Queensland's future development.

Brisbane Central Wharves were leased by the Australian coastal shipping company Howard Smith Co. Ltd from the mid-1930s until the early 1960s, and are more usually referred to as the Howard Smith Wharves. The site had an even earlier connection with Howard Smith, as the Brisbane Central Wharves replaced smaller wharves constructed in the early years of the 20th century by Brisbane Wharves Ltd, for lease by William Howard Smith & Sons Ltd [later Howard Smith Co. Ltd].

The construction of wharves beyond Circular Quay (the stretch of riverbank between the Customs House and the Story Bridge) was part of the gradual move downstream of port facilities at Brisbane, in a process which began in the 1840s. Following the opening of Moreton Bay to free settlement in 1842, commercial wharf facilities were erected at South Brisbane, which offered more direct access for Darling Downs and Ipswich commodities than the north bank of the river where the government wharf [Queen's Wharf] was located. By 1850, there were 5 commercial wharves on the south side of the Brisbane River.

However, following the declaration of Brisbane as a port of entry in 1846, a customs house was built in Queen Street near the Town Reach of the Brisbane River, on the north side of the river at Petrie Bight. From this time, the Town Reach rivalled South Brisbane in terms of shipping activity. In the late 1840s, 1850s and 1860s, a number of shipping companies and private investors constructed wharves and warehouses between Petrie Bight and Alice Street, near the botanic gardens. To encourage private business activity, the colonial government and Brisbane Municipal Council also built wharves along Petrie Bight in the 1870s and leased them to shipping companies. By 1900, the Brisbane Municipal Council owned a string of wharves from the custom's house to Boundary Street.

Private companies constructed wharves further downstream at New Farm, Teneriffe and Newstead from the early 1900s. In the 1920s-30s, the government built railway wharves at Pinkenba, branch rail lines to Teneriffe and Hamilton, and the state cold stores and reinforced concrete wharves at Hamilton. After the Story Bridge was opened in 1940, most large overseas and interstate vessels did not use the wharves at the Town Reach. Hamilton became the heart of Brisbane's port, and the part of the river from the South Brisbane Reach, round the Town Reach to Petrie Bight lost the ascendancy it had around the turn of the century. Since the 1960s, most of Brisbane's port activity has relocated to the mouth of the river.

In the 1880s, William Howard Smith & Sons Ltd (later Howard Smith Co. Ltd) leased the Commercial Wharf on the Town Reach from the Brisbane Municipal Council. Howard Smith was one of several important shipping companies which traded on the Australian coast from the mid-19th century, and was one of the earliest. The business was established in Melbourne in 1854 by Captain William Howard Smith, and in the second half of the 19th century developed as one of the dominant companies in the Australian coastal shipping trade. Initially the firm traded between Melbourne and England, but in 1860, entered the inter-colonial trade, and from 1864, concentrated solely on this. Howard Smith was trading in central Queensland by the early 1870s, and in the 1880s, extended its operations to northern Queensland. In the 1890s, the firm entered into a strong rivalry with other coastal shipping companies for the lucrative intra- and inter-colonial passenger trade.

In the late 1890s, Howard Smith moved downstream from the Commercial Wharves to the Brisbane City Council's Boundary Street Wharf at Petrie Bight, and in the early years of the 20th century, leased adjacent new wharves constructed by Brisbane Wharves Limited at the base of the New Farm cliffs. These wharves were extended c. 1912 and in the 1920s, and in the 1930s, were resumed by the Queensland government and rebuilt as the Brisbane Central Wharves.

The resumption and rebuilding of the Brisbane Central Wharves was an adjunct to the construction of the Story Bridge between Kangaroo Point and Fortitude Valley. As part of the bridge project the state government had resolved to improve the Brisbane River at Petrie Bight, by widening it to a uniform width of 800 feet (240 m), deepening the draught to about 26 feet (7.9 m), and improving the river approaches. This necessitated demolishing the existing wharves and sheds at the Brisbane Central Wharves, excavating the cliff below Bowen Terrace, and widening the river at this point by up to 70 feet (21 m). The path of the river was cut back and made smoother. Three chords were planned around the bend in the river, each providing a berth of about 500 feet (150 m). The total work, described in the 1935 Annual Report of the Bureau of Industry (the government body in charge of the project), was estimated to cost in excess of £400,000.

Work on the scheme commenced in 1934 and continued into the early 1940s. In January 1935, the existing wharf facilities occupied by Howard Smith Co. Ltd were resumed, along with a disused wharf upstream owned by the Brisbane City Council. The construction of the wharves was undertaken using day labour, and was staged over several years so that port activity could continue.

The first of the new structures erected was a two-storeyed reinforced concrete building completed by 1936 as offices for Howard Smith Co. Ltd. It was located on the waterfront, and commanded excellent views of the Town and Shafton Reaches of the Brisbane River.

Three berths with five new storage sheds were planned. Each of the gabled sheds was constructed primarily of hardwood timber, and sheeted and roofed with timber boards and corrugated iron. Sliding doors within these sheds opened towards the river for the handling of cargo. Sheds nos.1–3 were located at the upper berth under the Story Bridge, the middle berth accommodated the large no.4 shed [double-gabled, twice as wide as the others, and much longer], and no.5 shed was located at the lower berth downstream. No.5 shed was the first to be erected and a temporary wharf constructed. The middle berth with no.4 shed was almost completed by 1937, then work commenced on the upper berth, which was to contain sheds 1–3. This was completed in 1939.

For the wharves, a reinforced concrete base was laid on the rock at the river's edge, with timber piles rammed into the riverbed. Large hardwood timbers were used for the walings and decking, which extended about 24 feet (7.3 m) out over the river. Hundreds of thousands of feet of timber (mostly hardwoods such as ironbark, blue gum, yellow stringybark, spotted gum and messmate) were required to build the berths.

The road widening behind the sheds, which necessitated the cutting back of the New Farm cliffs, was completed by 1938.

As work continued on the lower berth into 1940, the Second World War intervened. By 1942 the men working on the Petrie Bight works were transferred to other projects more directly connected with the war effort, and work on the wharves was closed down. The third berth appears never to have been completed. A 1945 plan of the site shows the upper and middle berths complete but the lower berth still without any timber decking for wharfage.

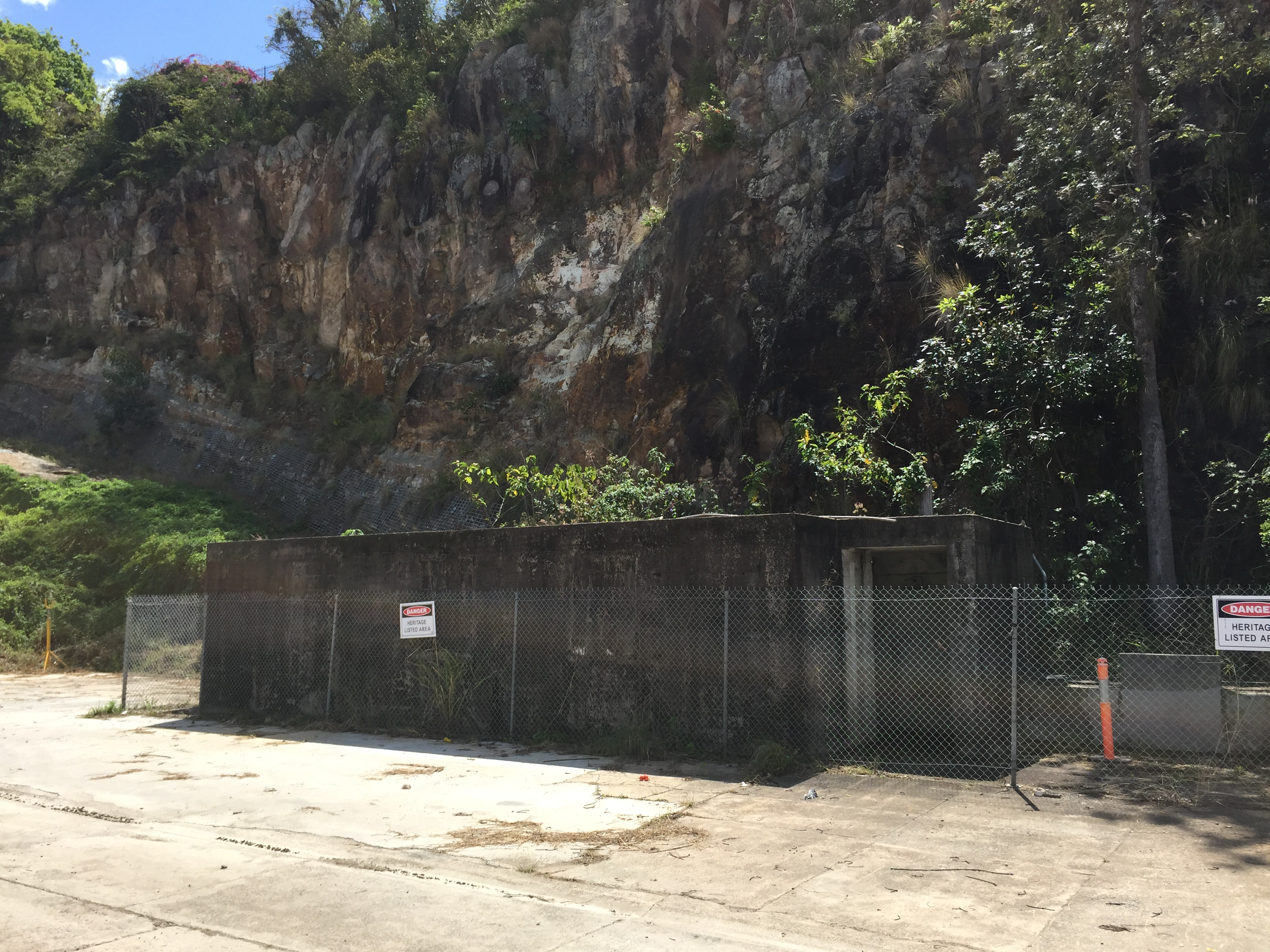
Air raid shelter adjacent to Howard Smith Wharves, 2014

In 1941–42, the Brisbane City Council constructed five air-raid shelters near the Howard Smith Wharves below the cliff face, for the Bureau of Industry. The threat of invasion by Japan appeared very real at the time, there was a substantial workforce employed at the wharves, and the site was located adjacent to the Story Bridge, a prime target in wartime. Three of the shelters were the usual "pillbox" style built by the City Council at many places in the inner city and in the suburbs. This was a standard type, rectangular in plan and constructed of concrete. However, the other two shelters at the Howard Smith Wharves were constructed of large stormwater pipes with multiple entrances. The Brisbane City Council used concrete stormwater pipes to cover the slit trenches in the Botanic Gardens and Victoria Park, but no other air raid shelters of the "pipe" type have been identified in Brisbane. It is not known why the two different types of shelters were constructed at the Howard Smith Wharves.

Howard Smith signed a 21-year lease over the Brisbane Central Wharves site in 1936. After this lease expired the company made the inevitable move in the early 1960s to better facilities downstream at the mouth of the Brisbane River. The Water Police then occupied part of the site [the office building and several sheds], and Queensland Works Department has used the site for storage for many years. Vehicles impounded by the police were stored here as well.

Since the early 1960s, the site has remained vacant. A large part of the timber decking from both the upper and middle berths was washed away during the 1974 floods. In early 2000, one of the heritage wharf buildings was demolished after partially collapsing into the Brisbane River.

Most of the wharves which were built in the late 19th and early 20th centuries in the central city have been demolished in the riverside re-developments of the last 20 years. The former Howard Smith Wharves remain one of the few surviving, and the most intact, with office, sheds and wharfage.

== Redevelopment proposals ==
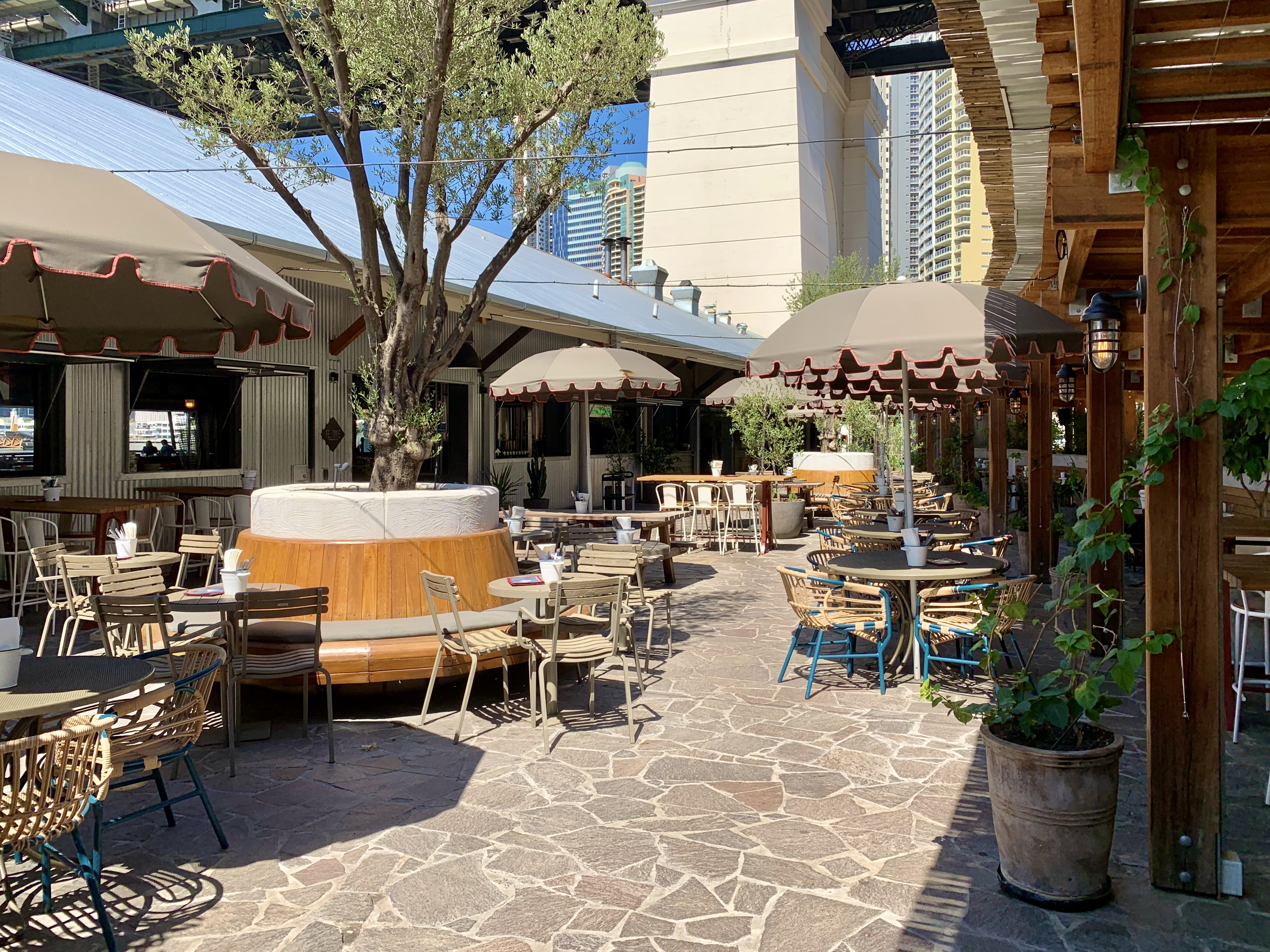
Felons Brewing Co. at Howard Smith Wharves 02

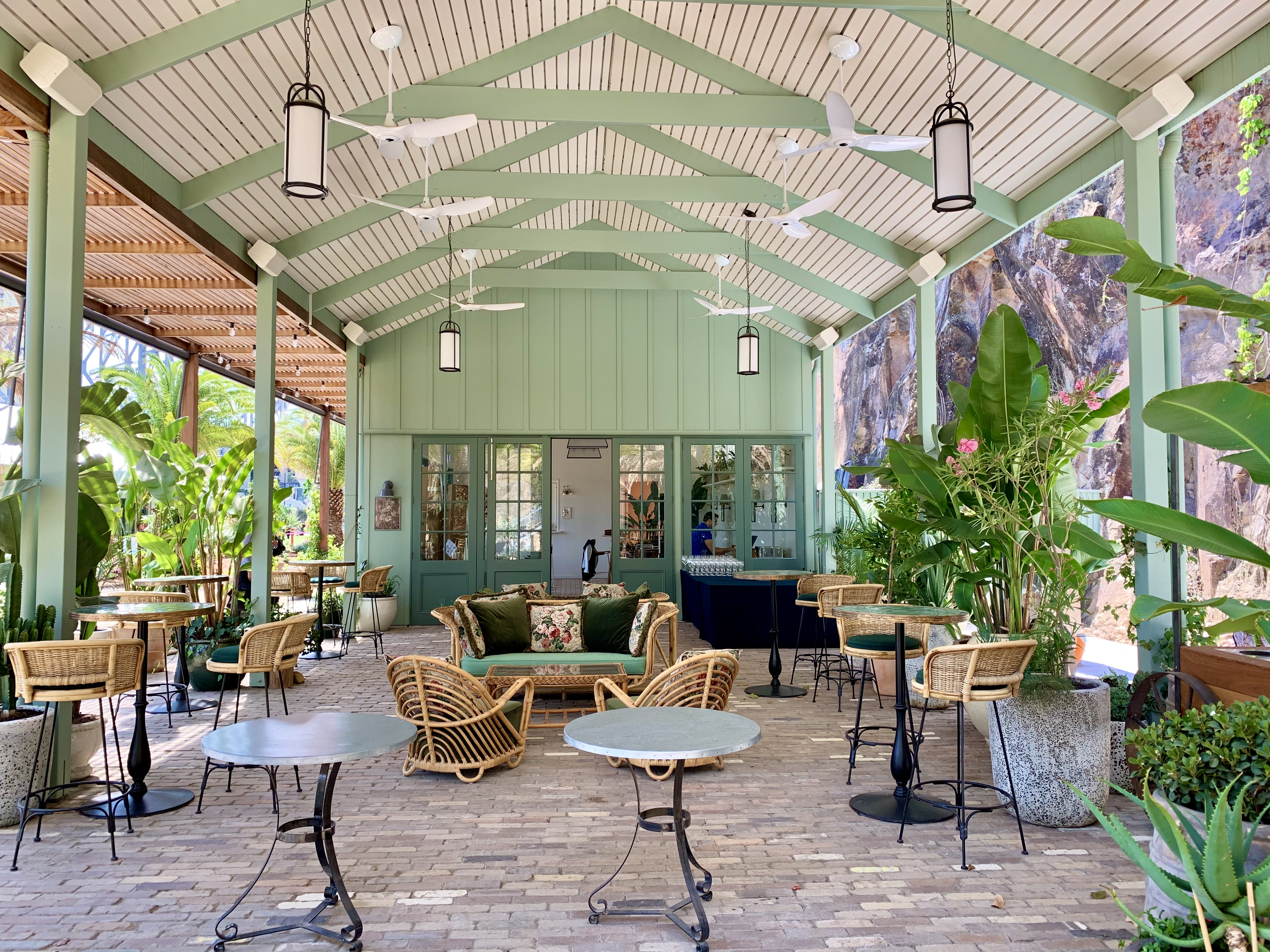
Green House at Howard Smith Wharves

On 18 August 2009, Brisbane City Council received the decision notice and approval package for the development application for Howard Smith Wharves. It was proposed to develop the site as three precincts:

- Precinct 1: hotel and tourism precinct
- Precinct 2: restaurant, retail, gallery, entertainment and commercial precinct
- Precinct 3: active outdoor recreation, entertainment and community facilities precinct

The plan also proposed to retain 80 percent of the site as open public space.

There was significant opposition to the initial development proposal, with parties concerned about the architectural, historical and ecological legacy of the development. The Brisbane Cliffs Coalition is objecting to the proposed development of the site, and the Howard Smith Wharves Appeal Committee was formed to fight the development plans in court.

In September 2009, 31 New Farm residents, including Councillor David Hinchliffe, launched legal action in the Planning and Environment Court, challenging the scale of the planned development. This action forced the council to back down and amend the plans for the site.

In June 2009 the Brisbane City Council has amended its redevelopment plans for Howard Smith Wharves in response to the community comments received during the consultation phase. The community was concerned about a loss of views, and the footprint of the building development area. As a result, Council has made changes to the development plans that include alteration in buildings shapes and size and the addition of a new 10-metre (33 ft) boardwalk and possible CityCat terminal.

The revised plan was available for comment as part of the public notification stage of the development application process. Only 10% of the parkland is to be used for retail development. After the 2010–11 Queensland floods, which inundated the site, the Queensland Government rejected the plans on the basis that they were a flood hazard. A$8.5 million project to restore the boardwalks was completed by February 2013, when new plans were announced.

== Description ==
The Howard Smith Wharves site is located on the northern bank of the Brisbane River at Petrie Bight, between the Town and Shafston Reaches. The boundary of the site is formed by cliffs along the northern, eastern and southeastern perimeter, which in turn are bounded by Bowen Terrace and Moray Street, with Wilson's Outlook overlooking the site from the southeast. The site is entered from the west off Boundary Street, and passes under the northern section of the Story Bridge (Story Bridge), with the northern pylons of the bridge located within the Howard Smith Wharves site.

The site contains a series of buildings with surviving sections of wharfage located along the riverfront. These buildings include a two storeyed reinforced concrete office building, currently occupied by the Water Police, near the western entrance to the site; the No.2 shed located between the Water Police offices and the northern pylons of the Story Bridge; the No.3 shed located to the east of the bridge pylons; the No.4 shed located to the southeast; and the No.5 shed which is at the end of the group towards the southeast. There are a number of other smaller structures, which include four former air-raid shelters located along the base of the cliffs, numerous concrete slabs, and a former air-raid shelter and lavatory block adjacent to the western entrance to the site.

Water Police Offices and Wharves The Water Police office building is a two-storeyed reinforced concrete structure with a hipped tiled roof and deep eaves. The building faces the Brisbane River to the south, with a rear street entrance from the north. The building has large sash windows with expressed sills and window surrounds, and long tiled sunhoods to the ground floor windows along the east, north and west elevations. The southern elevation has a cantilevered verandah to the first floor, with tiled awning, timber posts, batten balustrade and handrail, and corner lamps supported by curved metal brackets. French doors with fanlights open from the ground floor to the south, and onto the verandah from the first floor. The northern entrance has paired timber framed glass doors with wide sidelights, and louvred lavatory windows are located at the eastern end of the first floor. Evidence of early door openings which have been enclosed to house sash windows are visible.

Internally, the ground floor has a central entrance from the north with offices either side, and a large office area on the south overlooking the river. A concrete stair with metal balustrade and timber handrail is located in the southwest corner, and the building's reinforced concrete post and beam construction is evident. The first floor has a large office area opening onto the verandah overlooking the river to the south, with a central corridor accessing a lunch room, kitchen and lavatories on the northern side at the rear. The building has timber panelled internal doors with fanlights, and decorative ceiling cornices to the first floor.

A concrete edged, curved garden bed with a small cannon positioned centrally is located against the southern wall of the building, and decorative timber gates enclose the passageway between the office building and No. 2 shed to the east. A timber wharf extends from the southern elevation of the office building, and extends along the southern frontage of No. 2 shed with timber post and rail balustrade chain balustrade. This wharf has non-slip compressed sheeting fixed to the upper decking in traffic areas. A section of the wharf in front of the office building is recessed, with stairs down to a lower deck for smaller craft to berth.

The Sheds (Nos 2, 3, 4 and 5) The sheds are single storeyed timber-framed structures with corrugated steel gable roofs with deep eave overhangs on the northern and northeastern sides. The No. 4 shed has a double gable roof, and is the longest of the group. The sheds have corrugated steel cladding to walls, with large sliding timber doors to the ends of some of the sheds, and openings facing the river which originally provided access from the wharves.

Remains of timber piles from the earlier wharves are evident in front of No.3 and No.4 sheds. Internally, most of the sheds have timber floors, with No.5 having a concrete floor. Approximately half of the No.4 shed is built over the river. A concrete roadway runs behind the sheds, with concrete ramps accessing the ends of the sheds.

Former Air-Raid Shelters A series of former air-raid shelters are located along the base of the cliffs, with one located near the western entrance to the site.

Two sets of shelters are constructed of large concrete pipes with entrances at either end. One shelter, approximately opposite the junction between No. 3 and No. 4 sheds, is four bays in length. The other shelter, approximately opposite the junction between No. 4 and No. 5 sheds, is two bays in length.

The other shelters, rectangular concrete structures, have been converted for use as storage facilities and have had window openings introduced. Two are located in a fenced enclosure opposite No. 4 shed, and the other is near the western entrance to the site.

Cliffs and surrounds The cliffs extend from near the western entrance to the site to the southeastern boundary adjoining the Brisbane River. The cliff faces consist of overgrown sections in contrast to areas of exposed rock, and act as the support for the northern end of the Story Bridge. A large area of the site at the southeastern end is used to store stone blocks. This area also has two concrete slabs.

== Heritage listing ==
Howard Smith Wharves was listed on the Queensland Heritage Register on 4 February 1997 having satisfied the following criteria.

The place is important in demonstrating the evolution or pattern of Queensland's history.

The Howard Smith Wharves, constructed in the 1930s, are important in illustrating the evolution and development of Queensland history, providing rare surviving evidence of the port of Brisbane in the central city. Brisbane was and remains Queensland's premier port, and until the 1940s, the bulk of shipping facilities were located upstream from Hamilton. The Howard Smith Wharves are also important in demonstrating the range of employment-generating and infrastructure-building projects undertaken by the Forgan-Smith government during the 1930s Depression.

The Second World War air-raid shelters on the site are important as the most intact group of shelters surviving in Brisbane. The "pillbox" shelters survive as excellent examples of their type, and the "pipe" shelters are significant for their rarity value, being unlike any other known surviving air-raid shelters in Brisbane. The location of these shelters adjacent to the Howard Smith Wharves and Story Bridge illustrates the strategic importance of the wharves and bridge in 1941–42, and survive as an evocative illustration of how closely the war impacted upon Brisbane workers.

The place demonstrates rare, uncommon or endangered aspects of Queensland's cultural heritage.

As the last surviving wharfage in the central city the Howard Smith Wharves provide rare evidence of the pre-1940 port of Brisbane. The site is important also in demonstrating the principal characteristics of a 1930s port facility containing office building, sheds, roadway and wharfage.

The place is important in demonstrating the principal characteristics of a particular class of cultural places.

As Howard Smith Wharves it was one of the largest single wharf leases in central Brisbane, and the extent of the site remains intact to illustrate this.

The series of sheds, and former air-raid shelters, are expressive of their utilitarian function, and the office building is a well-mannered structure which is suggestive of its former use as the Howard Smith Company offices in the hierarchy of structures on the site.

The place is important because of its aesthetic significance.

The Howard Smith Wharves provide a setting for an appreciation of the views of the Story Bridge (Story Bridge), and through the scale and form of the various structures and the surrounding cliffs, the site has visual qualities which have considerable aesthetic value. The Howard Smith Wharves site is recognised as a Brisbane landmark, and makes a significant contribution to the Brisbane riverscape.

Individually, the various structures are of aesthetic significance as well as contributing to the aesthetic significance of the site as a whole. The surviving sections of wharves, constructed of large timber members, have a well-used and weathered aesthetic quality suggestive of former heavy usage.

The cliff faces, consisting of overgrown sections in contrast to areas of exposed rock, provide a dramatic visual backdrop to the low scale waterfront structures as well as acting as the support for the northern end of the Story Bridge.

The place has a special association with the life or work of a particular person, group or organisation of importance in Queensland's history.

The site is significant also for its close association for over 6 decades with the work of the Howard Smith Co. Ltd, one of Australia's principal 19th and early 20th century coastal shipping companies.

== See also ==
- List of parks in Brisbane
