= QUT Gardens Point ferry wharf =

Ferry terminal in Brisbane

QUT Gardens Point
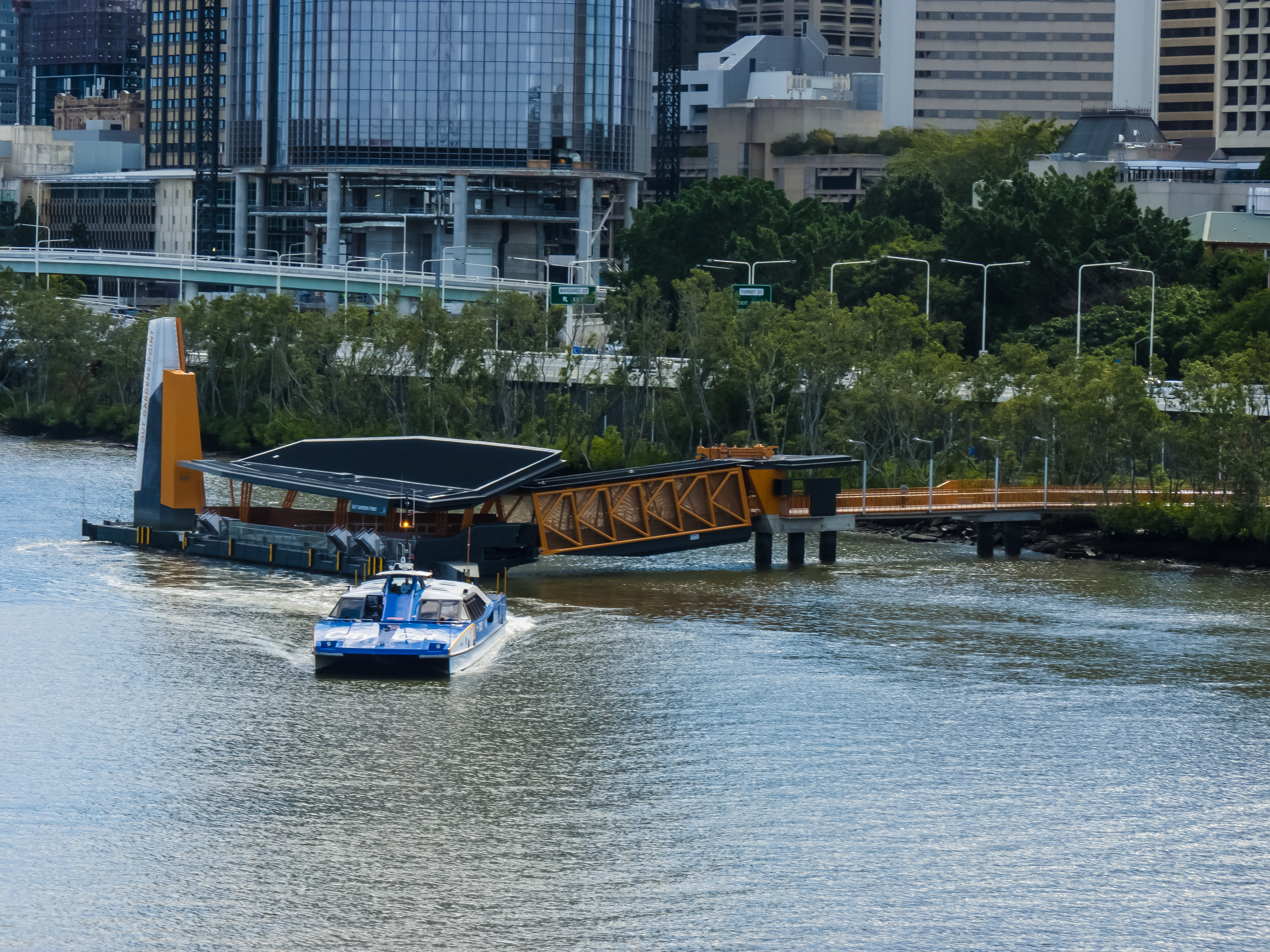

General information
- Location: Gardens Point Road, Brisbane CBD; Australia
- Coordinates: 27°28′35″S 153°01′30″E
- Owner: Brisbane City Council
- Operator: RiverCity Ferries
- Platforms: 2

Construction
- Accessible: Yes

Other information
- Station code: 319637
- Fare zone: go card 1

History
- Rebuilt: 24 April 2015

Services
Preceding wharf	RiverCity Ferries	Following wharf
South Bank towards UQ St Lucia	CityCat	Riverside towards Northshore Hamilton
Location

QUT Gardens Point ferry wharf is a CityCat terminal located on the northern side of the Brisbane River serving the Brisbane central business district in Queensland, Australia. It is operated by RiverCity Ferries on behalf of Brisbane City Council.

== Location ==
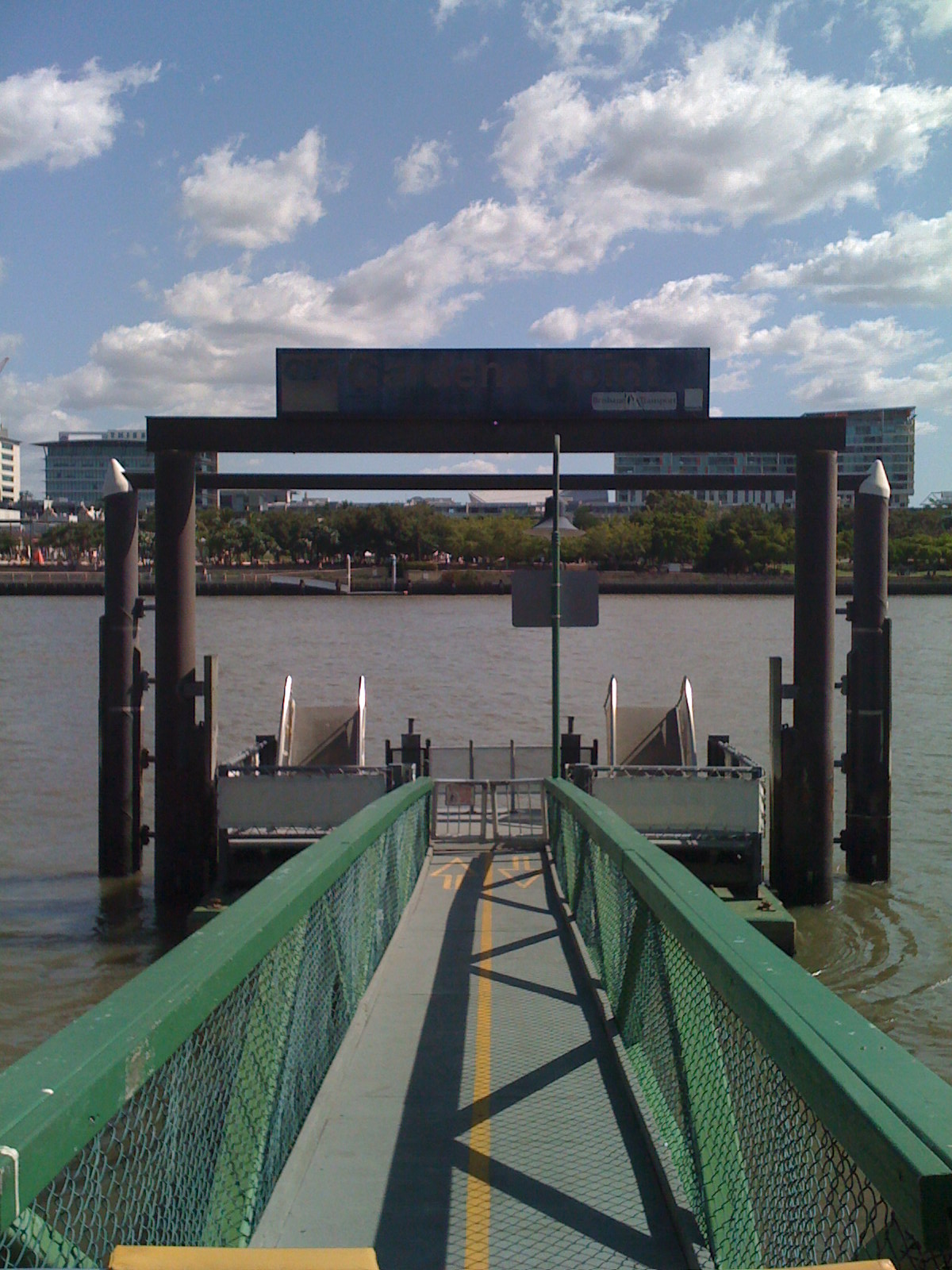
Old QUT Gardens Point Ferry Wharf in 2009.

QUT Gardens Point wharf is adjacent to the Queensland University of Technology Gardens Point campus and a short walk from the City Botanic Gardens and Riverstage. The northern access to the Goodwill Bridge for pedestrians and cyclists lies to the south of this wharf. Parliament House lies to the north. It connects to the Brisbane central business district via William Street to the northwest.

== History ==
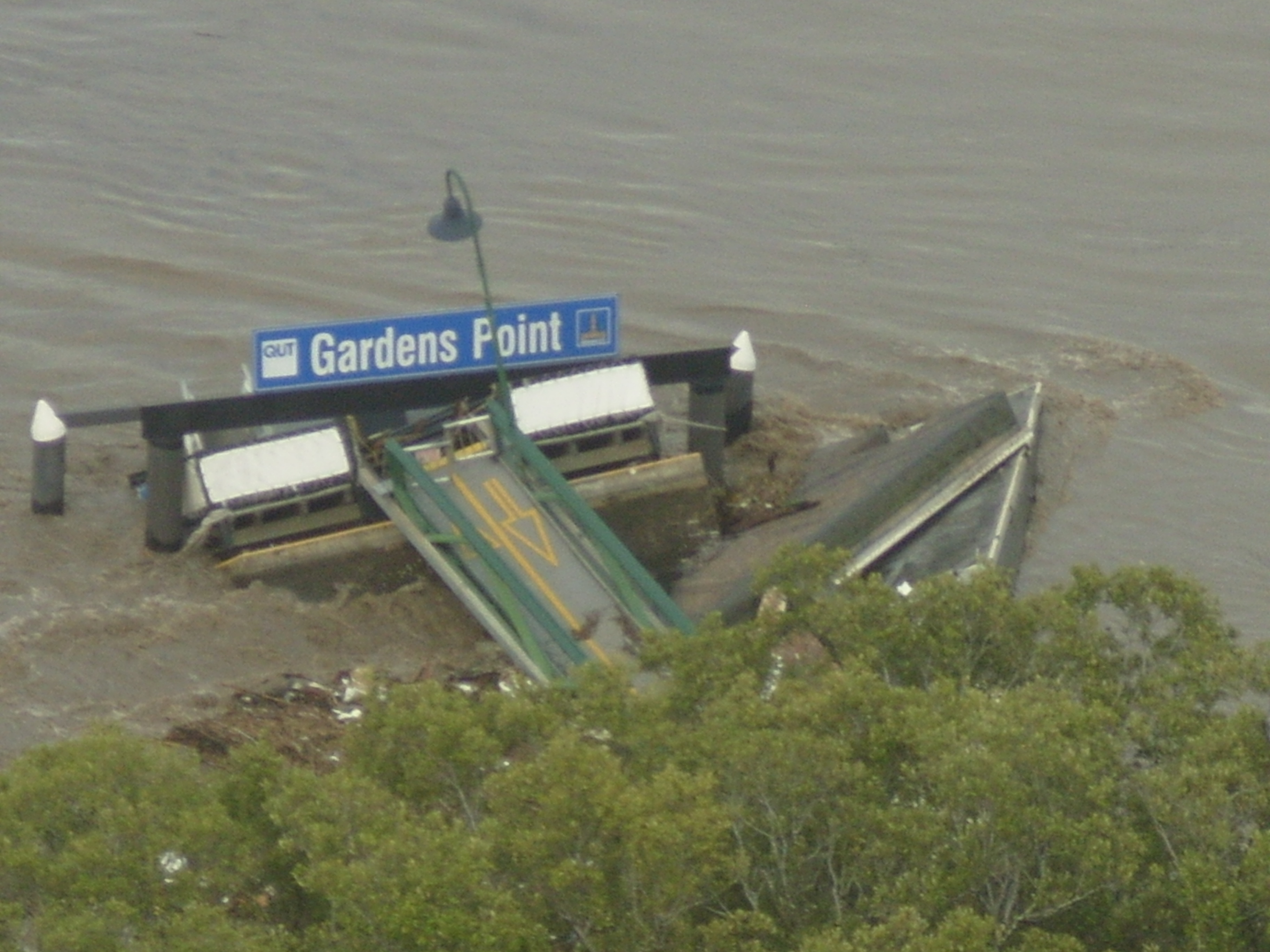
Old ferry wharf damaged in the 2011 floods.

The wharf was destroyed during the January 2011 Brisbane floods. A temporary replacement opened on 18 April 2011. The temporary wharf closed in early 2015 to allow a new permanent wharf to be built. The new wharf opened on 24 April 2015. The terminal was damaged in the 2022 eastern Australia floods and reopened on 1 November 2022.
