= Apollo Road ferry wharf =

Ferry wharf in Brisbane

Apollo Road
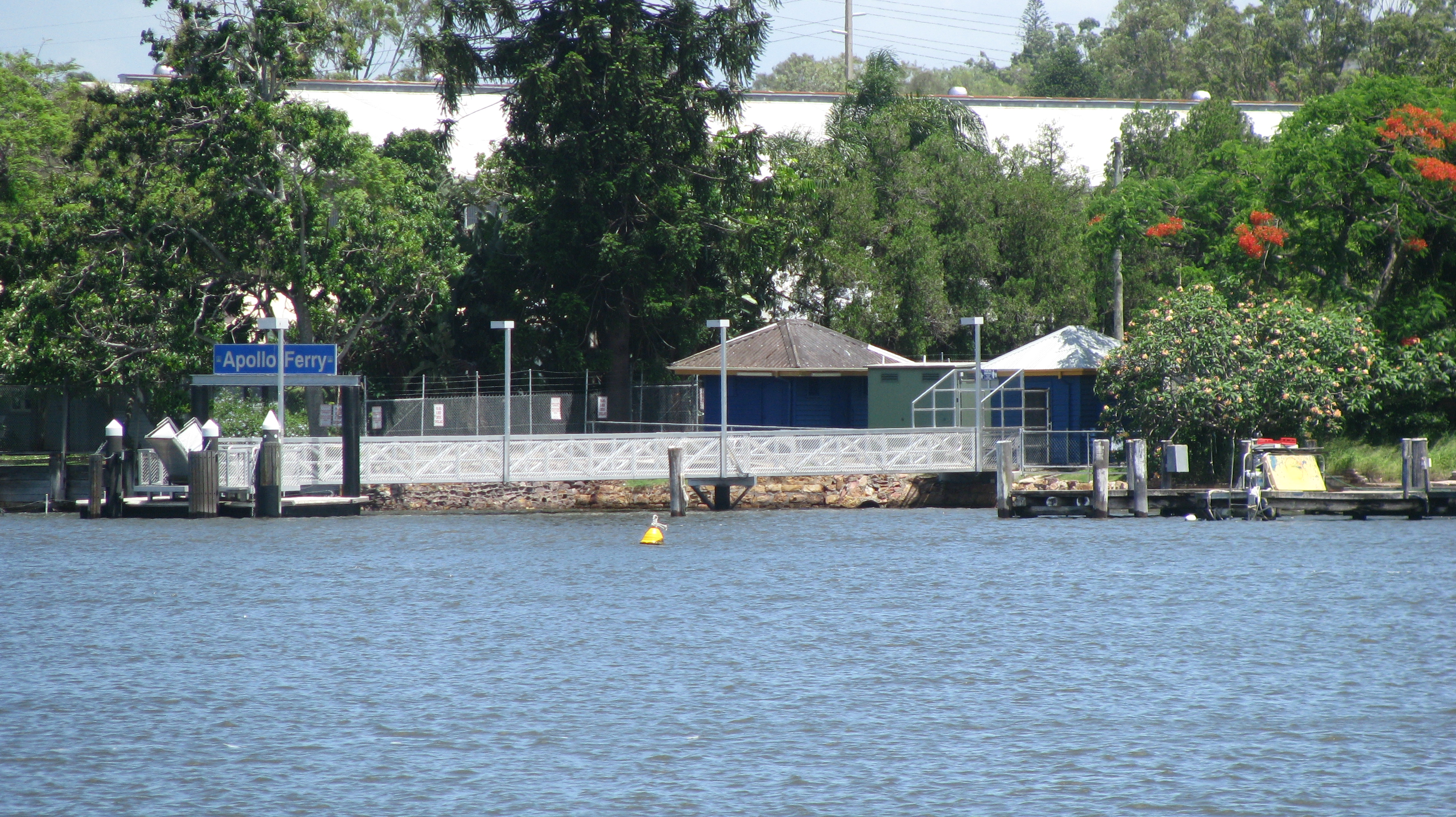

General information
- Location: Apollo Road, Bulimba
- Coordinates: 27.4432°S 153.0638°E
- Owner: Brisbane City Council
- Operator: RiverCity Ferries
- Platforms: 1

Construction
- Accessible: Yes

Other information
- Station code: 307147
- Fare zone: go card 1

Services
Preceding wharf	RiverCity Ferries	Following wharf
Bretts Wharf towards UQ St Lucia	CityCat	Northshore Hamilton Terminus
Location

Apollo Road ferry wharf is located on the southern side of the Brisbane River serving the Brisbane suburb of Bulimba in Queensland, Australia. It is served by RiverCity Ferries' CityCat services.

== History ==
The original wharf closed when Brisbane City Council ceased operating the cross river service to Bretts Wharf in December 1998 due to growing losses. It reopened on 4 February 2008 as the downstream terminus of the CityCat service.

The wharf sustained minor damage during the January 2011 Brisbane floods. It reopened after repairs on 14 February 2011.

Until October 2011, Apollo Road wharf was the downstream terminus for the CityCat service when it was extended to Northshore Hamilton.
