= Holman Street ferry wharf =

Ferry wharf in Brisbane, Australia

Holman Street
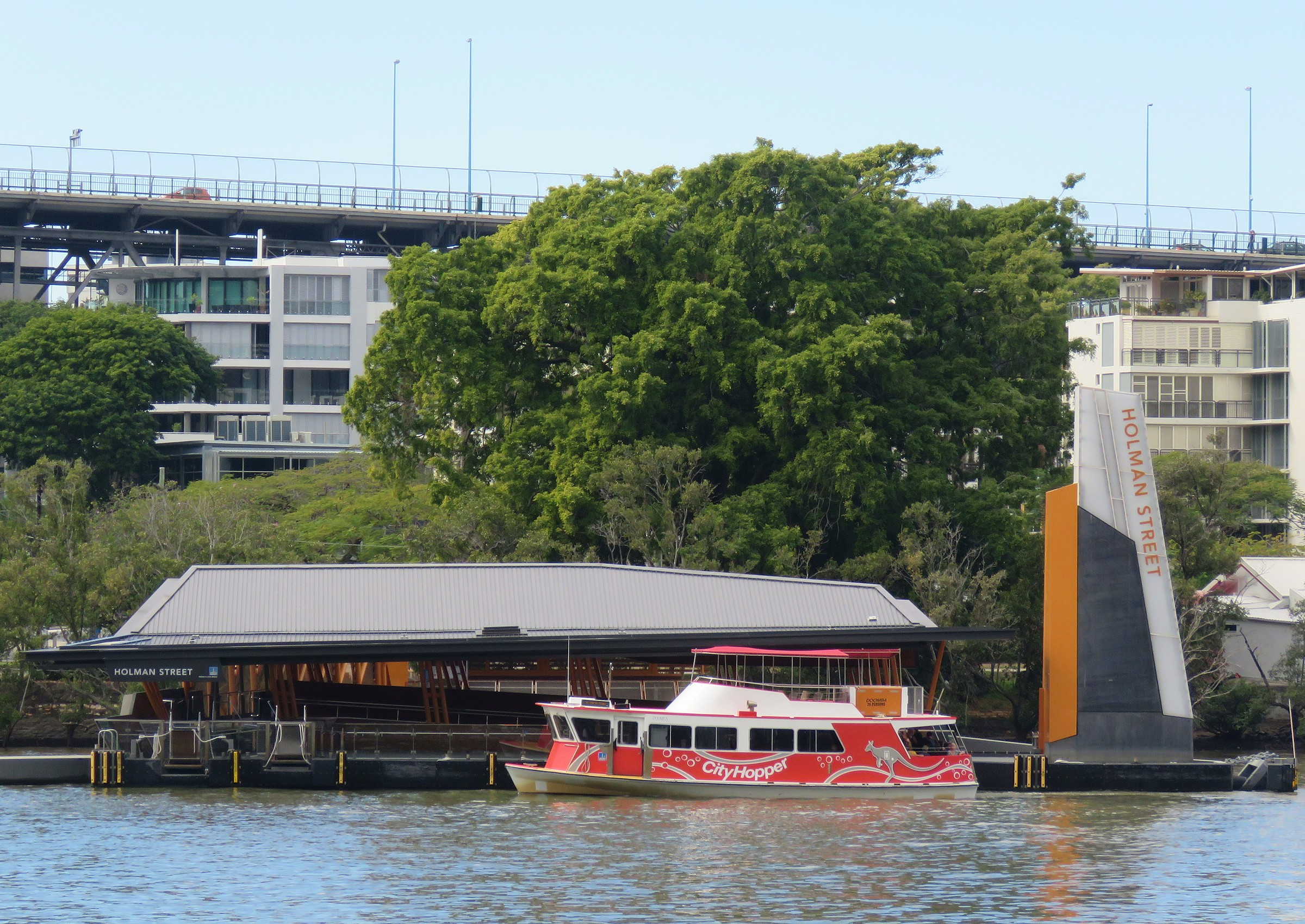

General information
- Location: Holman Street, Kangaroo Point; Australia
- Coordinates: 27°27′57″S 153°02′01″E
- Owner: Brisbane City Council
- Operator: RiverCity Ferries
- Platforms: 1

Construction
- Accessible: Yes

Other information
- Station code: 317580
- Fare zone: go card 1

History
- Opened: 1845
- Closed: April 2015
- Rebuilt: 23 June 2015

Services
Preceding wharf	RiverCity Ferries	Following wharf
Riverside towards North Quay	CityHopper	Howard Smith Wharves towards Sydney Street
Riverside towards Howard Smith Wharves	Cross River Ferries–Kangaroo Point	Terminus
Location

Holman Street ferry wharf
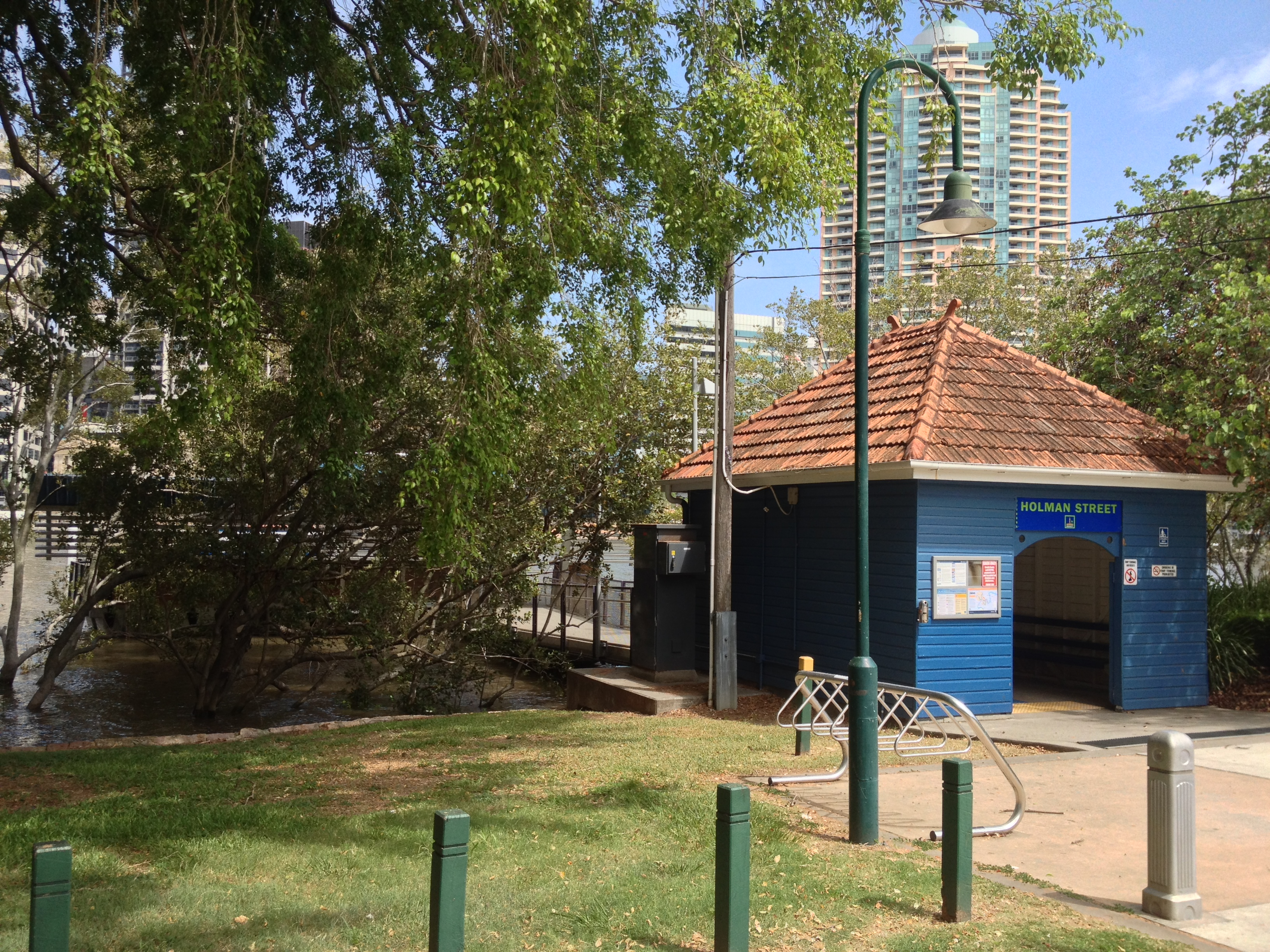
- Holman Street ferry terminal building, 2014

- Location within Queensland Location within Australia
- 27.4658°S 153.034°E
- Location: 116 Holman Street, Kangaroo Point, Queensland, City of Brisbane, Queensland, Australia

History
- Design period: 1840s–1860s (mid-19th century)
- Built: c. 1919

Site notes
- Architectural style: Classicism

Queensland Heritage Register
- Official name: Holman Street Ferry Terminal
- Type: state heritage (built, landscape)
- Designated: 1 November 2004
- Reference no.: 602445
- Significant period: c. 1919–1990s (historical); 1910s–1920s (fabric)
- Significant components: views from, pontoon, waiting shed, wall/s – retaining, bench/seat

Holman Street ferry wharf is a heritage-listed ferry wharf located on the southern side of the Brisbane River in Kangaroo Point, City of Brisbane, Queensland, Australia. It is served by RiverCity Ferries' CityHopper and the Cross River service to Riverside wharf. It was added to the Queensland Heritage Register in 2004.

== History ==
The Holman Street Ferry Terminal was built prior to 1919 for the City of Brisbane, then responsible for the servicing of ferry routes across the Brisbane River. Kangaroo Point was one of Brisbane's earliest suburbs, emerging in the 1840s with other localities such as South Brisbane, Fortitude Valley and Spring Hill. Because of its close proximity to the city, Kangaroo Point played an important role as a point of arrival and departure for Brisbane's ferries.

In 1845 the Government accepted a tender of £34 from George Beer for a second ferry crossing for Brisbane from Kangaroo Point. In 1852 the government outlaid £185 and in 1853, £700 for ferry improvements. Andrew Petrie worked on improving the approaches and also the road at the north end of Kangaroo Point ferry. In 1853 W. Carter won the lease for Kangaroo Point Ferry and put on a new horse-punt - 30 feet (9.1 m) long and 12 feet (3.7 m) broad, pulled by a rope and chain. Ferries ran from a number of different localities in the area including Holman, Bright, Thornton and Ferry Streets. Destinations on the north side included Charlotte and Edward Streets, and Customs House and Merthyr Road, New Farm. The Petrie Bight - Holman Street ferry was in operation at separation in 1859.

A cable operated vehicular punt plied the route well after the Victoria Bridge was erected in 1874, transporting people, vehicles and animals. The ferry began to operate from the Customs House Reserve in 1882, but as a vehicular ferry, is believed to have ceased in 1883/84. A new vehicular steam ferry began operating from Charlotte Street to Bright Street at the same time. A passenger ferry continued, however, and the waiting shed on that side of the river was re-erected on the customs house site in 1886. Tidal steps were apparently built on the Holman Street side to service the passenger ferry.

Work was carried out at the Holman Street landing stage and pontoon in 1906. At that time there was a ferry tollhouse on site, but it is not possible to tell whether this also served as a waiting shed. Repairs were carried out on the site in 1912, but were probably related to the pontoon.

In 1919 the Ferries & Baths Committee recommended that the shelter shed on the Kangaroo Point side of the Customs House ferry be cleaned inside and the chamfer boards be oiled on the outside. A recommendation by the Lighting Committee in 1919 saw the installation of electric lighting at the Holman Street ferry – electricity having replaced gas for street lighting at Kangaroo Point, c. 1918. In July 1925 the Brisbane City Council's Bridges and Ferries Committee recommended that control of all ferries should pass to the new Greater Brisbane Council.

The wharf was destroyed during the January 2011 Brisbane floods. A temporary replacement opened on 18 April 2011. The temporary wharf closed in April 2015 to allow a new "permanent" wharf to be built. It opened on 23 June 2015. The Ferry Terminal was once again destroyed during the 2022 eastern Australia floods, when struck by a house boat.

== Description ==
The Holman Street Ferry Terminal is on the bank of the Brisbane River at the end of Holman Street, Kangaroo Point next to Captain Burke Park. Trees flank a small timber waiting shed and the river bank on either side of the shed is supported by a retaining wall. This extends about 13 metres (43 ft) to the north and about 30 metres (98 ft) to the south between the ferry and the Brisbane Jazz Club building. The longer section of wall is composed of dressed blocks of Brisbane tuff; on the northern side it is composed of concrete and irregularly placed pieces of tuff. The terminal is approached from the riverside by a pontoon and from the landward side by a pathway and concrete apron entrance leading into the terminal. On the northern side of the entrance there are plantings of shrubs and a bauhinia tree. To the south is a grassed area with two large mature trees. The modern pontoon structure and the mangrove trees in the water along the retaining wall hide the waiting shed from the river.

The terminal building was square in plan with a hipped roof, clad in terracotta tiles and crowned with two terracotta finials. It has arched openings to the street and the river. The floor of the building is concrete and the walls are clad in chamferboard. The interior has timber bench seats against the walls.

The terminal has a modern extension to the jetty leading to a pontoon and extending again to another modern pontoon to which the ferry docks. This jetty from the terminal to the landing stage has modern metal mesh guardrails. The modern section of the jetty is not considered to have heritage significance.

== Heritage listing ==
Holman Street Ferry Terminal was listed on the Queensland Heritage Register on 1 November 2004 having satisfied the following criteria.

The place is important in demonstrating the evolution or pattern of Queensland's history.

The Holman Street Ferry Terminal is important as an intact example of a purpose built ferry terminal from the first quarter of the 20th Century. Together with terminals such those at Hawthorne (Hawthorne ferry wharf) and Bulimba (Bulimba ferry wharf), its quality of design and detail demonstrates the importance of ferries in the development of Brisbane before a network of bridges and public transport was fully developed and before many people owned cars.

The place demonstrates rare, uncommon or endangered aspects of Queensland's cultural heritage.

The terminal waiting shed represents an increasingly rare building type as modern buildings now serve most Brisbane River ferry terminals.

The place is important in demonstrating the principal characteristics of a particular class of cultural places.

The Holman Street terminal displays those features typical of ferry terminals comprising a pontoon for river access, a landing area and covered waiting area for passengers.

The place is important because of its aesthetic significance.

The terminal also has aesthetic significance as a well-designed public building in a parkland setting. The ferry terminals serve as focal points in the journey along the Brisbane River.
