= CityGlider =

Pair of bus routes in Brisbane, Australia

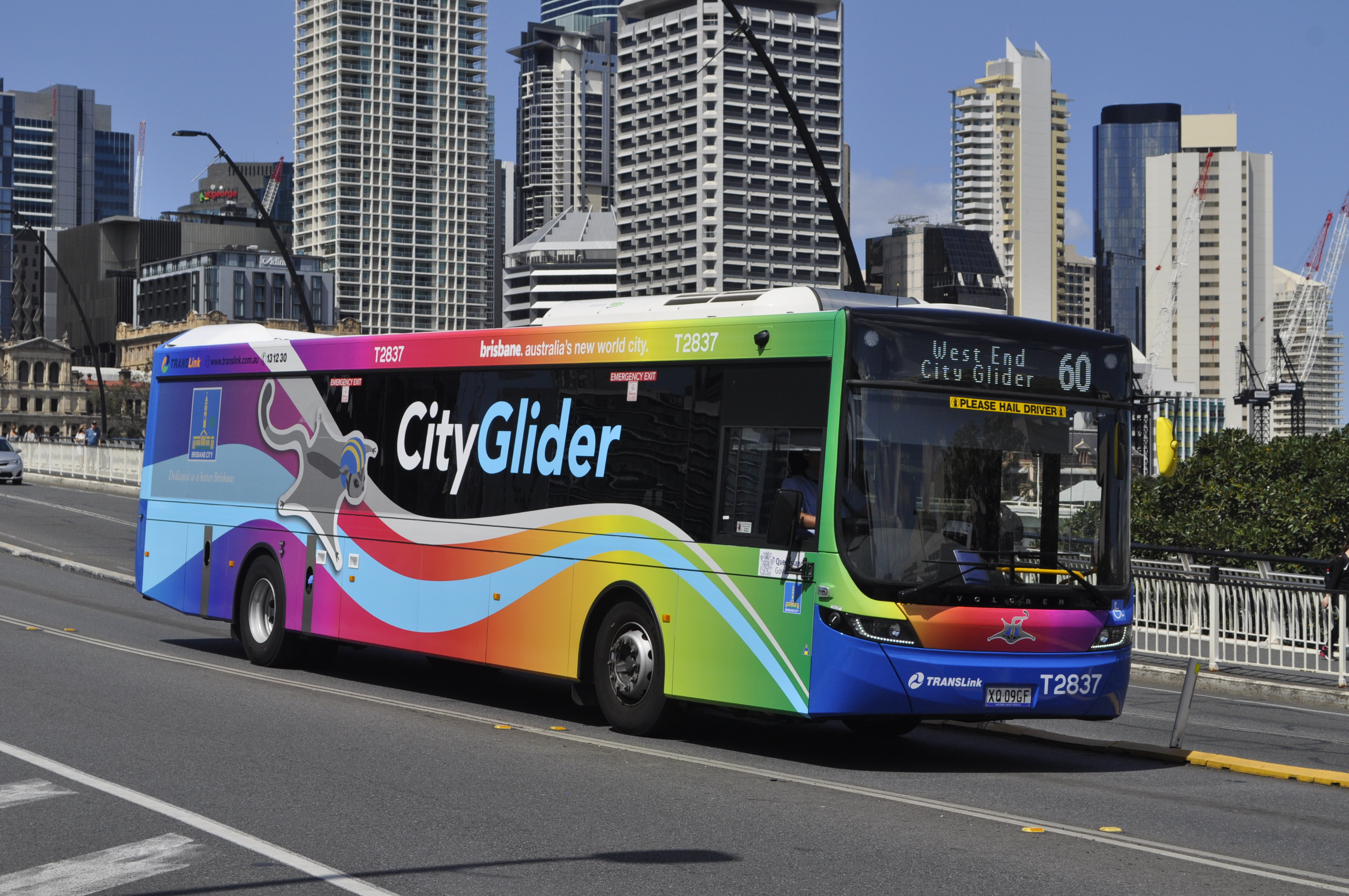
CityGlider route 60

CityGlider is a brand name applied to a pair of high-frequency bus routes operated by Transport for Brisbane in Brisbane, Australia. Bus stops serviced by the CityGlider services are identified with signs and painted kerb. Both operate 24 hours a day on Fridays and Saturdays. Both are operated by dedicated fleets of buses vinyled in either blue or maroon liveries with a gliding possum motif, which was originally illustrated by Anya Lange.

The CityGlider service is pre-paid only, meaning passengers are required to use a go card to touch on/off when boarding and exiting the service. To assist with keeping the service running on-time, both front and rear boarding is possible. (Post COVID all buses allow front and rear door boarding)

== Blue CityGlider ==
60
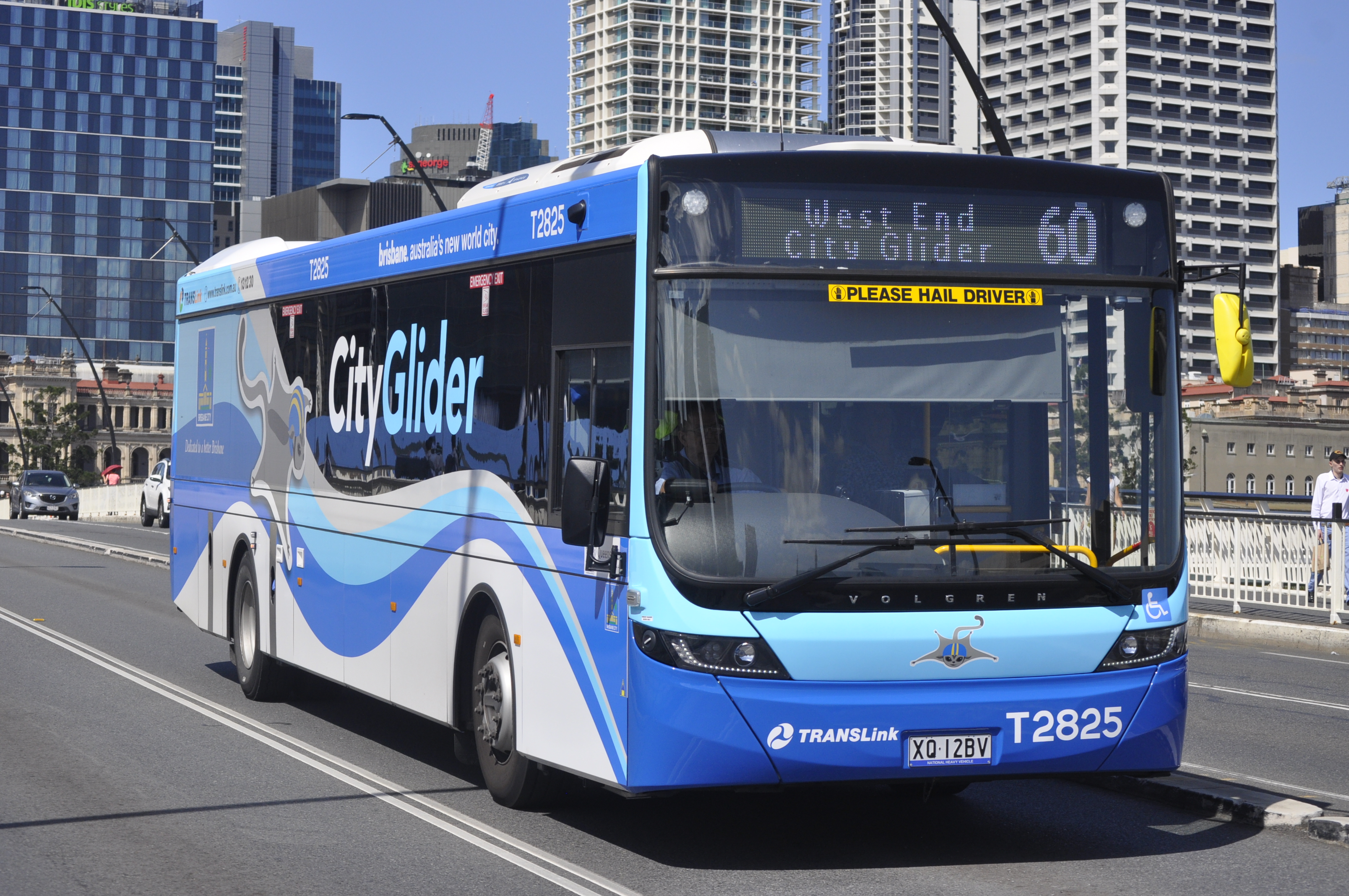

Overview
- System: Translink
- Operator: Transport for Brisbane
- Garage: Eagle Farm
- Began service: 11 April 2010

Route
- Start: West End ferry wharf
- Via: Cultural Centre busway station Adelaide Street; Fortitude Valley; Newstead
- End: Teneriffe ferry wharf

Service
- Level: Daily

The Blue CityGlider was launched on 11 April 2010. also known as route 60, the Blue CityGlider runs from West End ferry wharf via the Cultural Centre busway station, Adelaide Street, Fortitude Valley and Newstead to Teneriffe ferry wharf.

It runs every five minutes during morning and afternoon peak and every 10 to 15 minutes during off-peak. It was also the first service in Brisbane to operate 24 hours on Friday and Saturday and operates for 18 hours every other day.

In April 2014 a petition started by a local worker was signed by 1,070 people and called upon the Brisbane Transport to reroute the westbound service from Teneriffe via Skyring Terrace past the Gasworks Shopping and Restaurant Precinct rather than via Commercial Road. Brisbane City Council supported the rerouting of the service and relocating the Commercial Road bus stop to Skyring Terrace. These changes were implemented on 15 December 2014.

The Blue CityGliders were garaged at Brisbane Transport's Bowen Hills depot, then Toowong depot after Bowen Hills depot was closed, until early 2020 when all were transferred to the Eagle Farm Depot. This occurred in preparation for the introduction of Volvo B8RLEA Volrgen Optimuses to the route. In January 2019, the Blue CityGlider fleet was replaced with new Volvo B8RLE’s (Fleet number 2820–2838), replacing the previous-generation MAN 18.310's (Fleet number 1030–1049). On 12 July 2021, the Volvo B8RLE's were replaced by the Volvo B8RLEA's articulated buses. These buses could carry about 50% more passengers and are based out of the Eagle Farm depot (number from 1653 to 1670). Starting from June 2025, additional 2 B8RLEAs (Fleet number 1651-1652) joined the CityGlider fleet - a total of 21 vehicles in fleet (1651-1670 and 2838).

== Maroon CityGlider ==
61
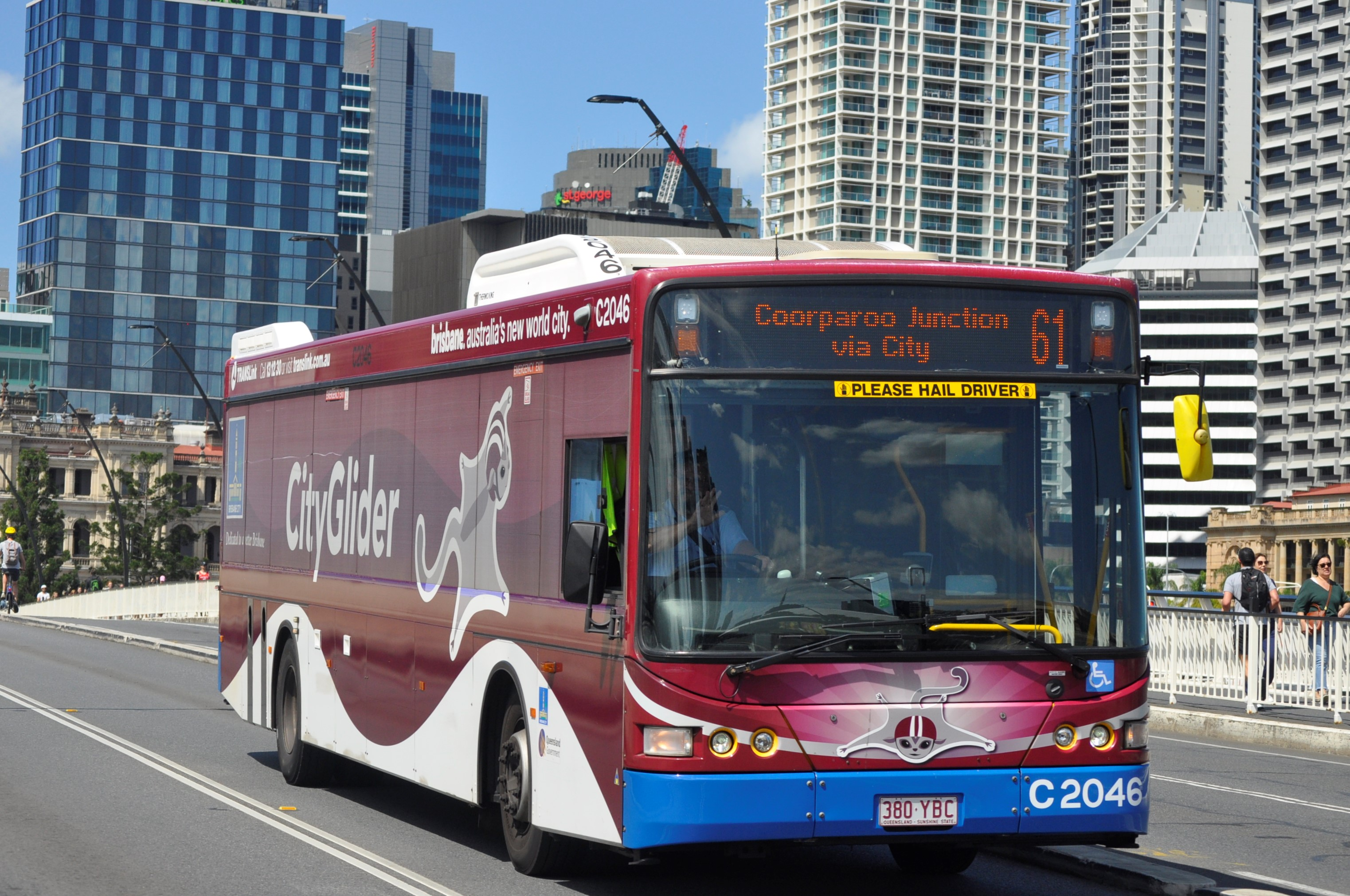

Overview
- System: Translink
- Operator: Transport for Brisbane
- Garage: Carina
- Began service: 18 February 2013

Route
- Start: Ashgrove
- Via: Paddington; South Bank busway station Woolloongabba busway station Stones Corner
- End: Coorparoo Square

Service
- Level: Daily

This second CityGlider east to west route commenced on 18 February 2013. Also known as route 61, the Maroon CityGlider runs from Ashgrove via Paddington, South Bank busway station, Woolloongabba busway station and Stones Corner to Coorparoo Square. It connects major sporting, entertainment, shopping and dining precincts.

The Maroon CityGliders are garaged at Brisbane Transport's Carina depot, using a fleet of 13 Volgren CR228L bodied Volvo B7RLEs (Fleet number 2036–2048).

== Proposed Gold CityGlider ==
Proposed Gold CityGlider

Overview
- System: Translink
- Operator: Transport for Brisbane
- Status: Proposed

Route
- Start: Northshore Hamilton
- Via: Newstead; Bowen Hills railway station Fortitude Valley; Mary Street
- End: Woolloongabba busway station

Service
- Frequency: Daily

The Gold CityGlider is a proposed new CityGlider service. It is proposed to run from Northshore Hamilton via Newstead, Bowen Hills railway station, Fortitude Valley and Mary Street to Woolloongabba busway station. It is proposed to connect to Portside Wharf, Breakfast Creek, RNA showgrounds, Bowen Hills and Fortitude Valley shopping and dining precincts, Albert Street / Mary Street / Eagle Street retail and dining precincts in the CBD (including 1 William Street, Queens Wharf Brisbane, Parliament House, QUT Gardens Point and the future Cross River Rail station at Albert Street), The Gabba and the Woolloongabba dining precinct.
