= Sydney Street ferry wharf =

Ferry wharf in Brisbane, Australia

Sydney Street
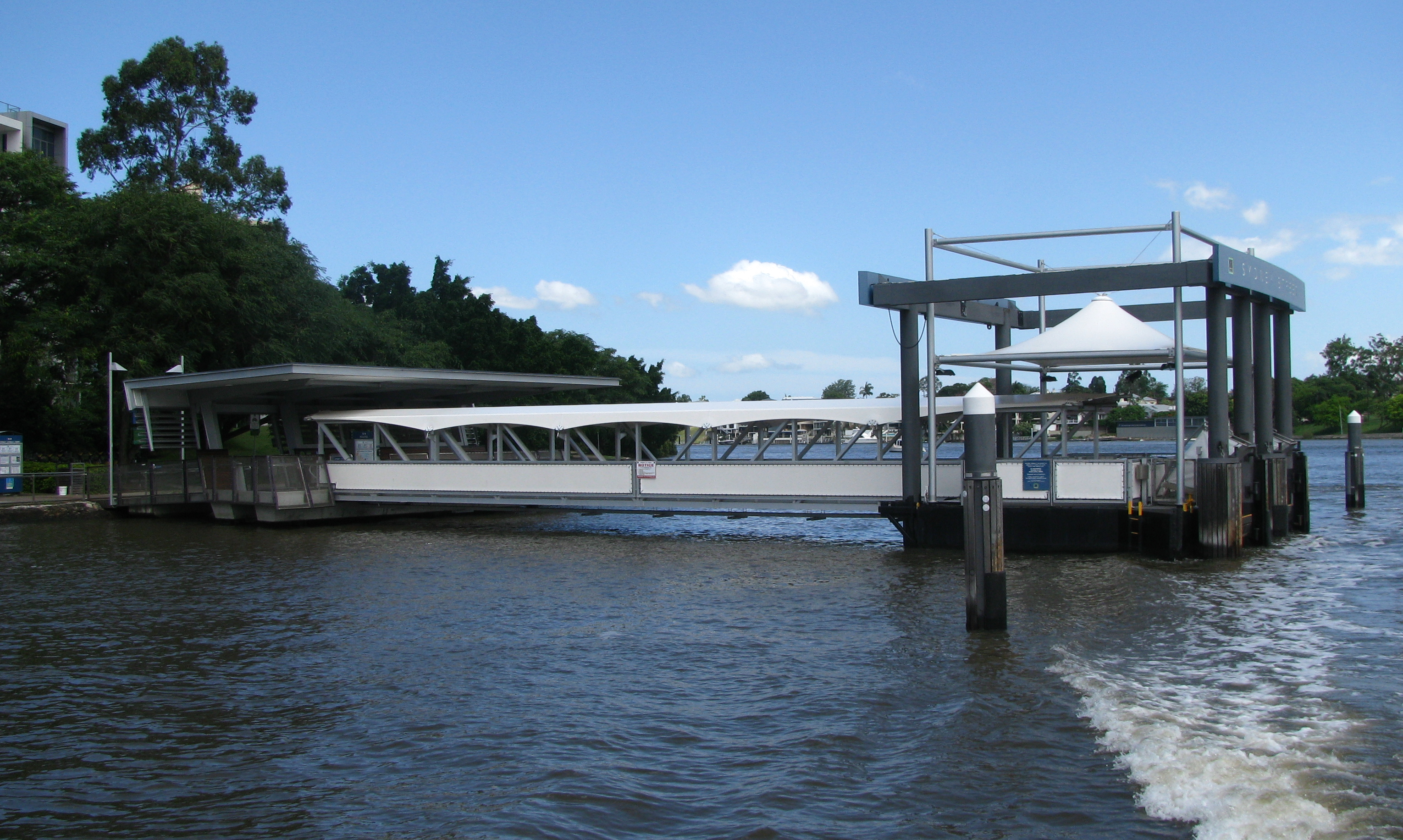

General information
- Location: Sydney Street, New Farm; Australia
- Coordinates: 27°28′29″S 153°02′33″E
- Owner: Brisbane City Council
- Operator: RiverCity Ferries
- Platforms: 1

Construction
- Accessible: Yes

Other information
- Station code: 317589
- Fare zone: go card 1

History
- Closed: 4 January 2015
- Rebuilt: 6 May 2015

Services
Preceding wharf	RiverCity Ferries	Following wharf
Riverside towards UQ St Lucia	CityCat	Mowbray Park towards Northshore Hamilton
Howard Smith Wharves towards North Quay	CityHopper	Terminus
Location

Sydney Street ferry wharf is located on the northern side of the Brisbane River serving the Brisbane suburb of New Farm in Queensland, Australia. It is served by RiverCity Ferries' CityCat and CityHopper services.

== History ==
The wharf was destroyed during the January 2011 Brisbane floods. A temporary replacement opened on 18 April 2011.

The temporary wharf closed in January 2015 to allow a new permanent wharf to be built. The new wharf opened on 6 May 2015.
