= West End ferry wharf =

Ferry wharf in Brisbane, Australia

West End Ferry Terminal
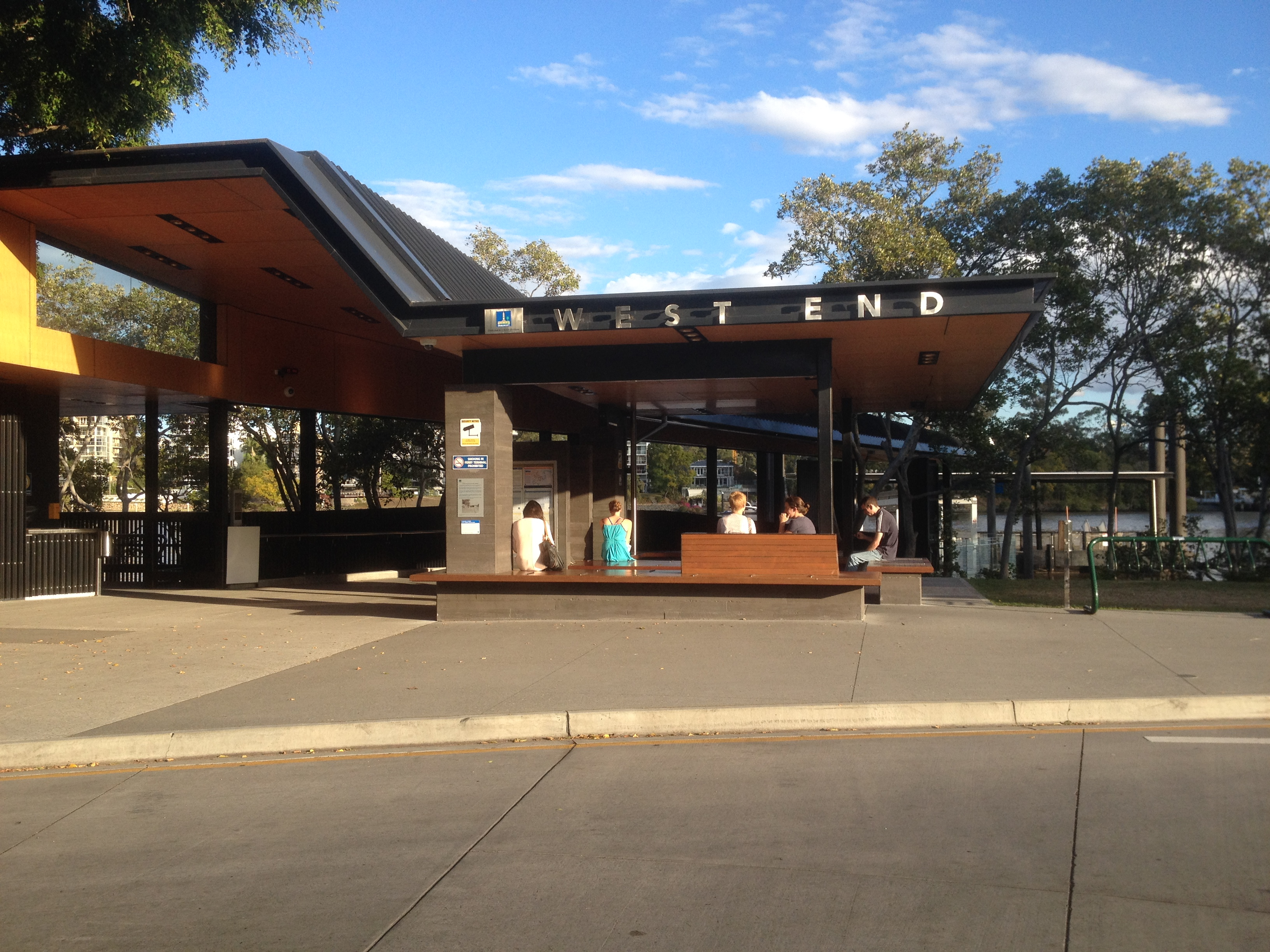
- Wharf entry

General information
- Location: Orleigh Street, West End; Australia
- Coordinates: 27°29′25″S 153°00′12″E
- System: Brisbane City Council City Cat (Operated by River City Ferries)
- Owner: Brisbane City Council
- Operator: RiverCity Ferries
- Platforms: 1

Construction
- Accessible: Yes

Other information
- Station code: 317574
- Fare zone: go card 1

History
- Rebuilt: 24 July 2011

Services
Preceding wharf	RiverCity Ferries	Following wharf
UQ St Lucia Terminus	CityCat	Guyatt Park towards Northshore Hamilton
Location

West End ferry wharf is located on the southern side of the Brisbane River serving the Brisbane suburb of West End in Queensland, Australia. It is served by RiverCity Ferries' CityCat services.

== History ==
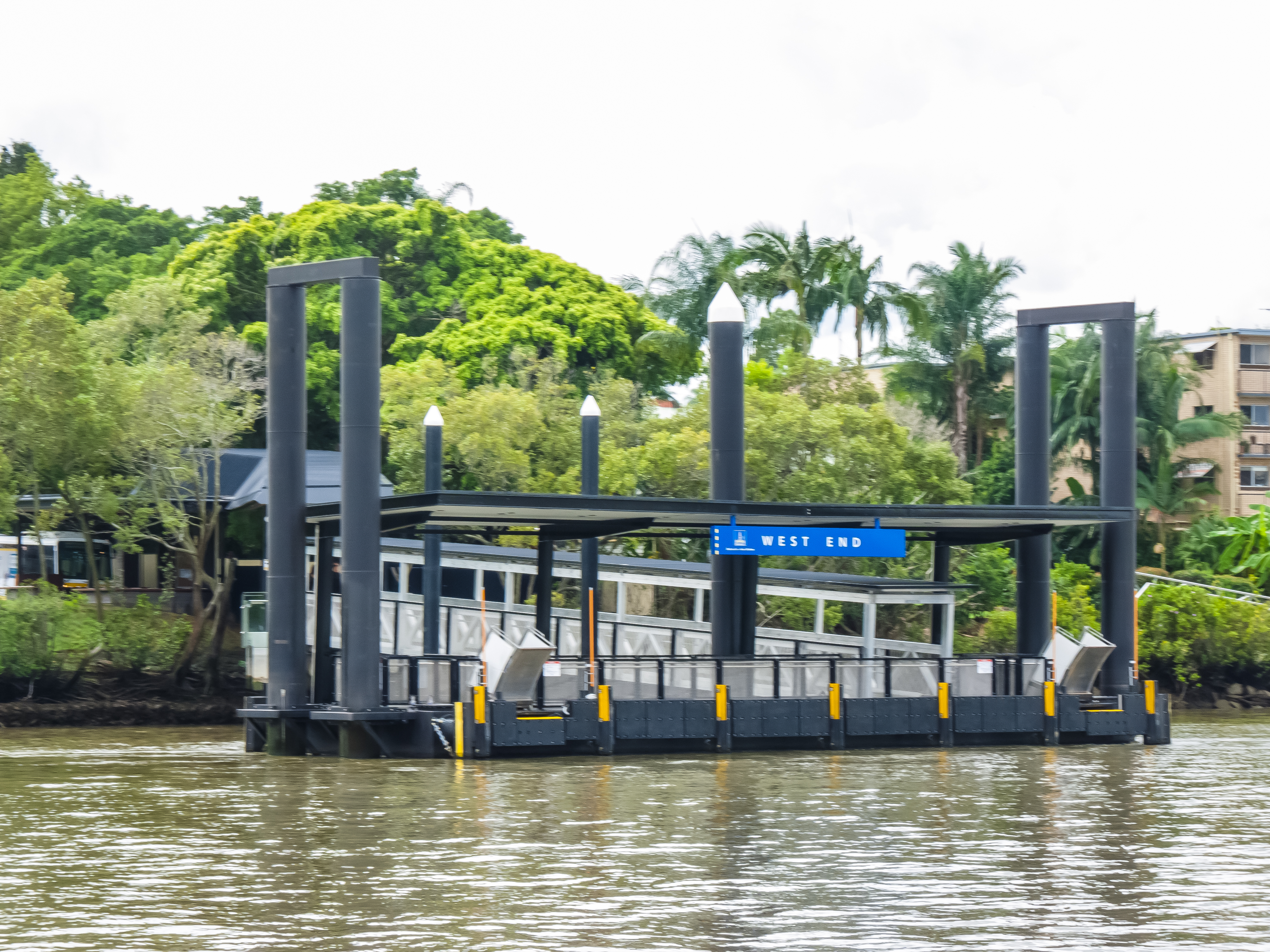
New wharf in 2012

The wharf was destroyed during the January 2011 Brisbane floods. A new wharf opened on 24 July 2011.
