= North Quay ferry wharf =

Ferry wharf serving North Quay, Brisbane

North Quay
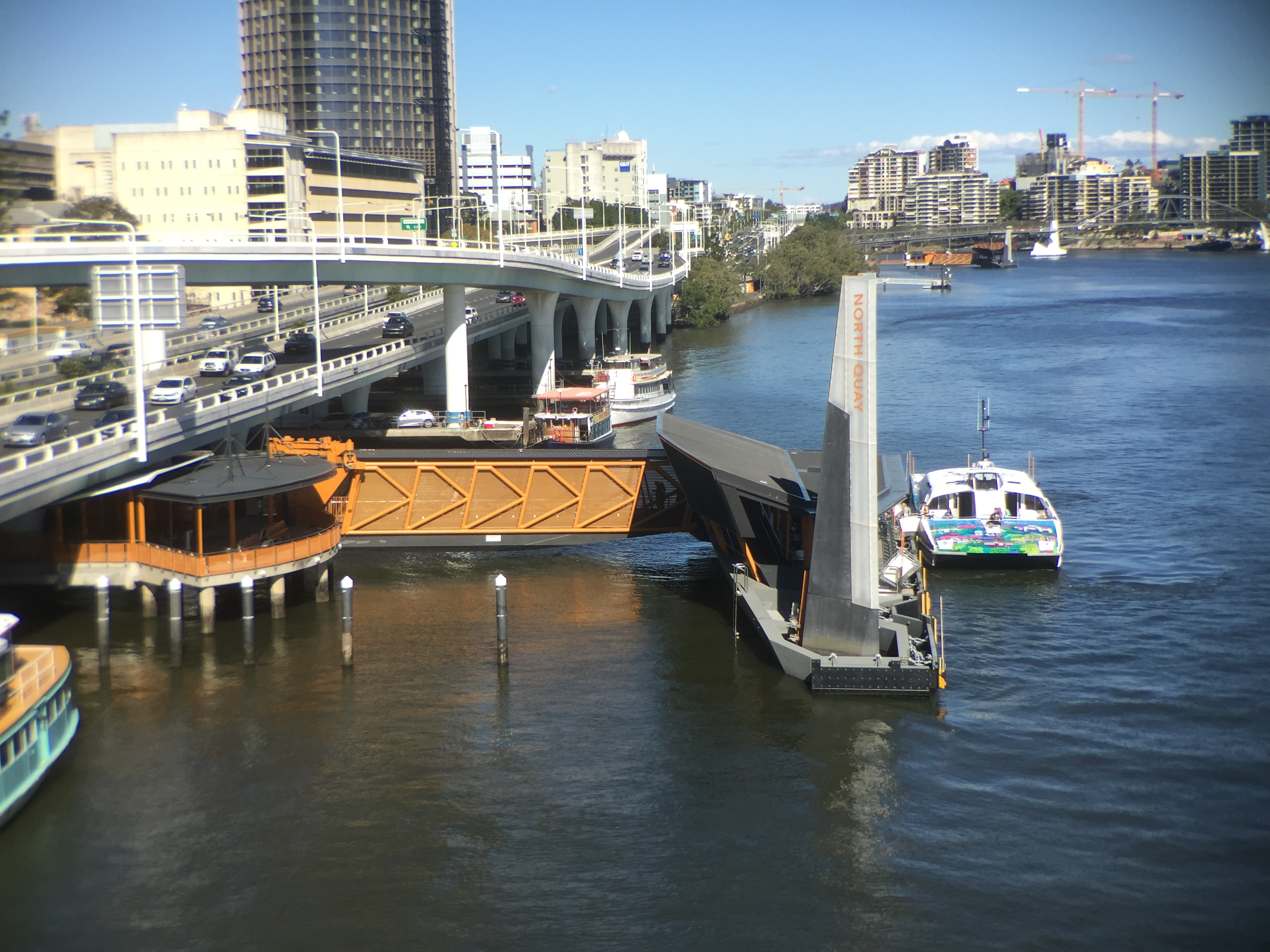

General information
- Location: Queens Wharf Road, Brisbane CBD
- Coordinates: 27°28′21″S 153°01′22″E
- Owner: Brisbane City Council
- Operator: RiverCity Ferries
- Platforms: 2

Construction
- Accessible: Yes

Other information
- Station code: 317593 (wharf 1); 317594 (wharf 2)
- Fare zone: go card 1

History
- Closed: 9 March 2015
- Rebuilt: 15 June 2015

Services
Preceding wharf	RiverCity Ferries	Following wharf
Milton towards UQ St Lucia	CityCat	South Bank towards Northshore Hamilton
Terminus	CityHopper	South Bank towards Sydney Street
Location

North Quay ferry wharf is located on the northern side of the Brisbane River serving the Brisbane central business district in Queensland, Australia. It is served by RiverCity Ferries' CityCat and CityHopper services.

== History ==
The wharf was destroyed during the January 2011 Brisbane floods. A temporary replacement opened on 18 April 2011. The temporary wharf closed on 9 March 2015 to allow a new permanent wharf to be built. The new wharf opened on 15 June 2015.

== Location ==
The wharf is located off Queens Wharf Road and connect directly to the Bicentennial Bikeway. It is the closest ferry wharf to the Queen Street Mall and the rest of the Brisbane central business district. It lies under and to the south of the CBD end of the Victoria Bridge.
