= UQ St Lucia ferry wharf =

Ferry wharf in Brisbane

UQ St Lucia
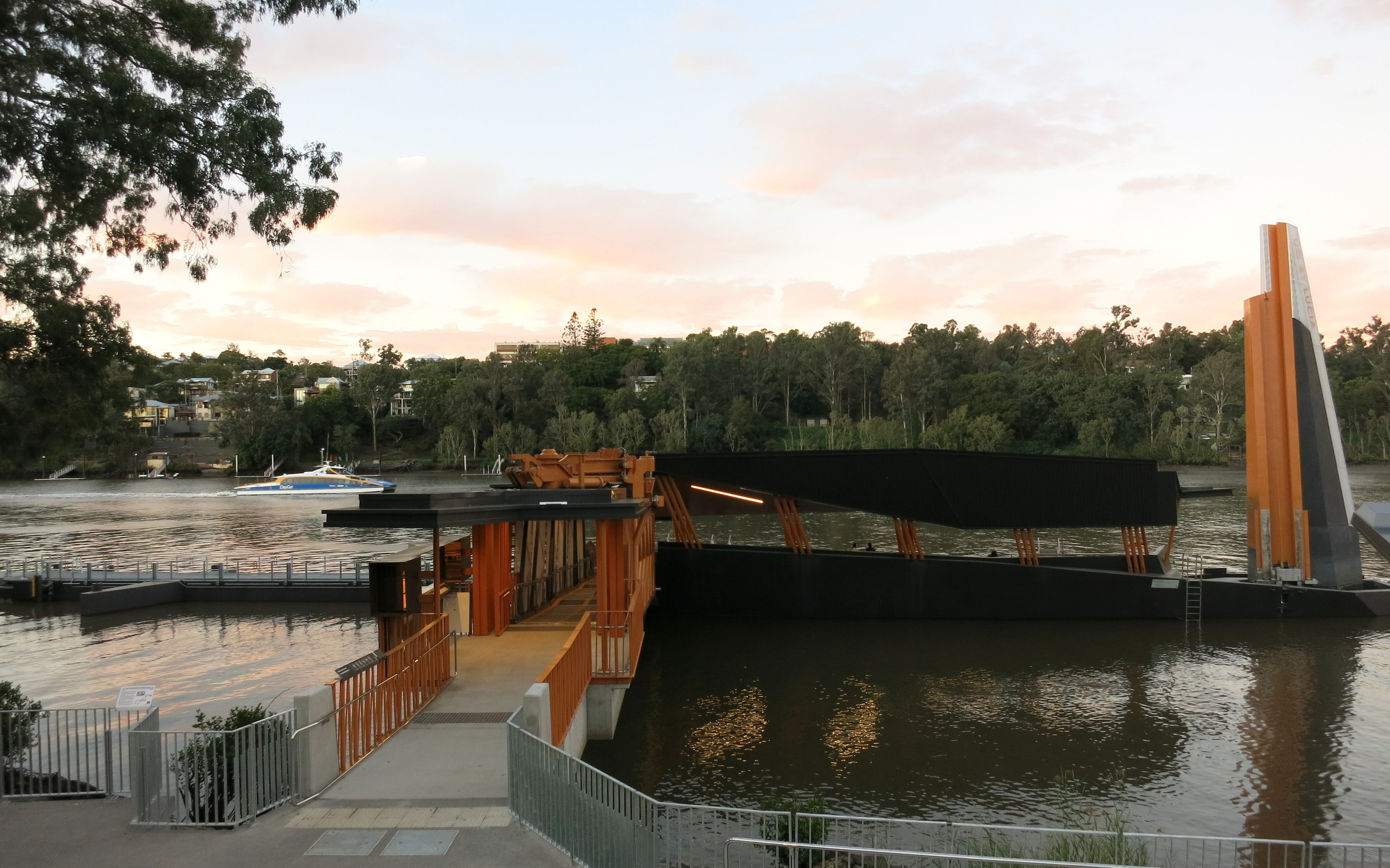

General information
- Location: Sir William Macgregor Drive, St Lucia
- Coordinates: 27°29′37″S 153°01′00″E
- Owner: Brisbane City Council
- Operator: RiverCity Ferries
- Platforms: 1

Construction
- Accessible: Yes

Other information
- Station code: 319665
- Fare zone: go card 1

History
- Rebuilt: 25 May 2015

Services
Preceding wharf	RiverCity Ferries	Following wharf
Terminus	CityCat	West End towards Northshore Hamilton
Location

UQ St Lucia ferry wharf is located on the southern side of the Brisbane River serving the Brisbane suburb of St Lucia in Queensland, Australia. It is served by RiverCity Ferries' CityCat services.

== History ==
A non-TransLink cross river ferry service formerly ran between the University of Queensland and Dutton Park, but was discontinued when the bus, cyclist and pedestrian only Eleanor Schonell Bridge adjacent to the route was completed.

The previous University of Queensland ferry terminal was destroyed during the January 2011 Brisbane floods. A temporary replacement opened on 18 April 2011.

On 25 May 2015, the new UQ St Lucia ferry terminal opened. The new terminal is 450 metres upstream from the previous facility, and is near the UQ Lakes busway station and Eleanor Schonell Bridge.
