= Northshore Hamilton ferry wharf =

Ferry terminal in Brisbane

Northshore Hamilton
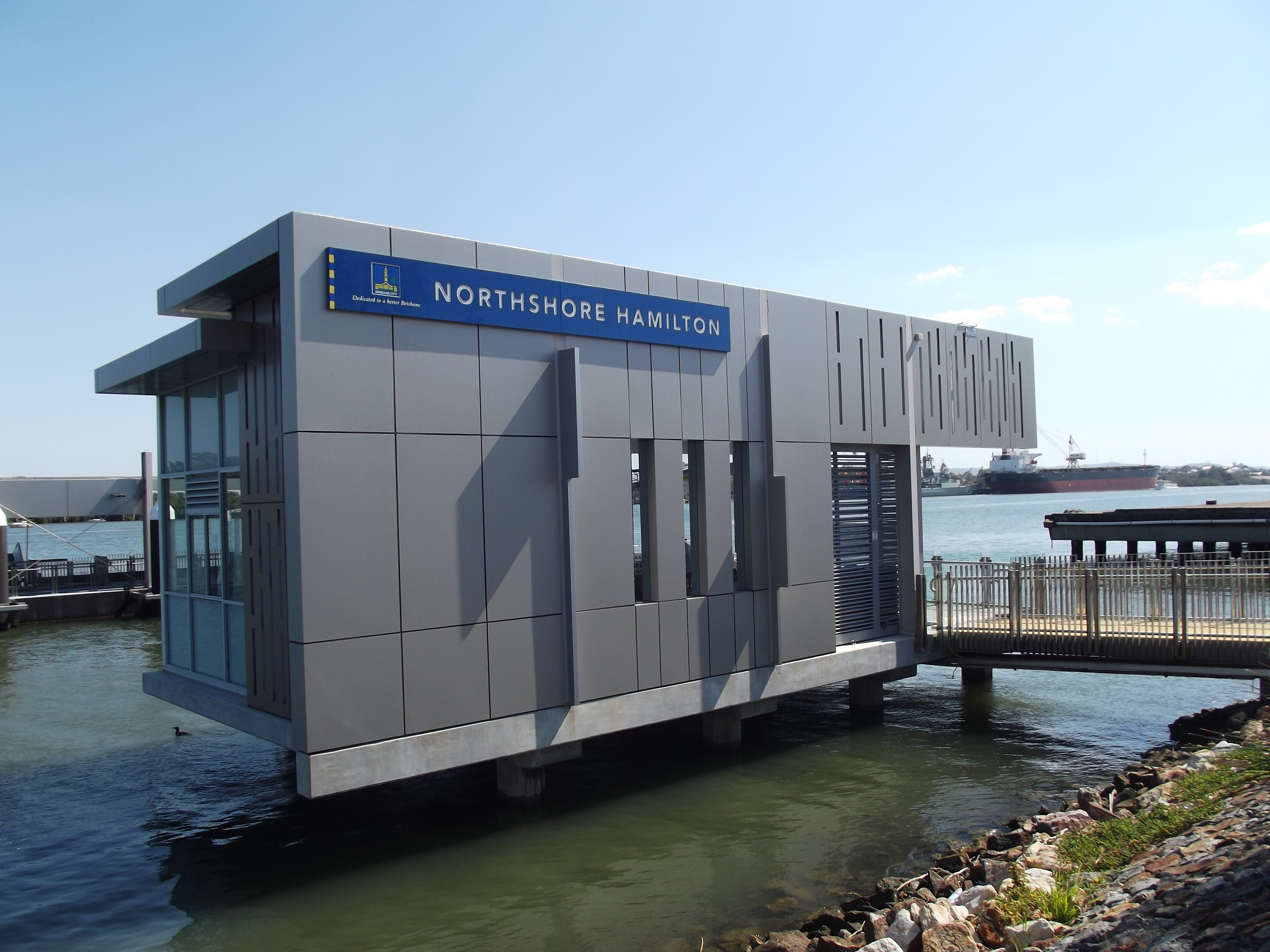

General information
- Location: Northshore Riverside Park, Hamilton
- Coordinates: 27.44519°S 153.08387°E
- Owner: Brisbane City Council
- Operator: RiverCity Ferries
- Platforms: 2

Construction
- Accessible: Yes

Other information
- Station code: 318002
- Fare zone: go card 1

History
- Opened: 2 October 2011

Services
Preceding wharf	RiverCity Ferries	Following wharf
Apollo Road towards UQ St Lucia	CityCat	Terminus
Location

Northshore Hamilton ferry wharf is located on the northern side of the Brisbane River serving the Brisbane suburb of Hamilton in Queensland, Australia. It is the downstream terminus for RiverCity Ferries' CityCat services.

== History ==
The wharf opened on 2 October 2011. It has pontoons for two CityCats and a waiting area with seating for 24 people. The design of the terminal is based on a shipping container.
