= Transdev Brisbane Ferries =

Operator of the ferry network in Brisbane, Australia

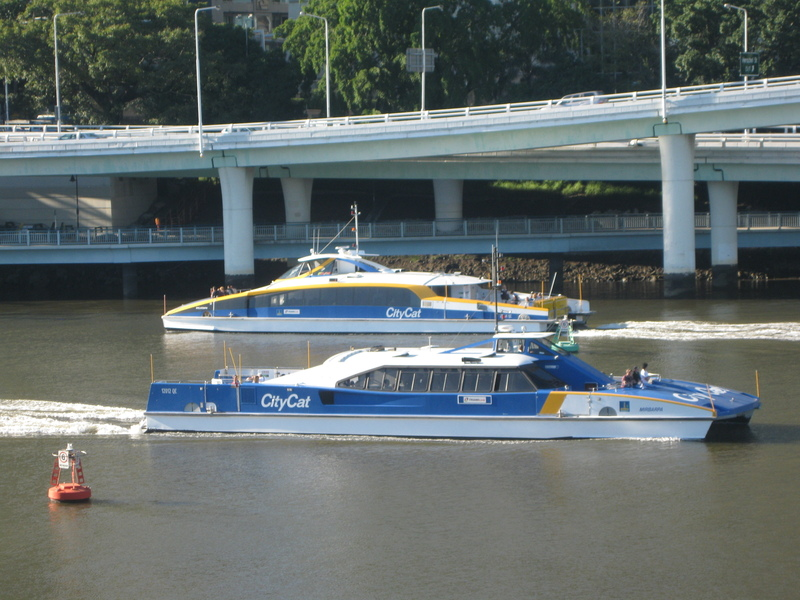
- Predecessor: River Connections
- Founded: November 2003; 23 years ago
- Defunct: 3 November 2020; 6 years ago
- Successor: RiverCity Ferries
- Headquarters: Brisbane, Australia
- Area served: Brisbane River
- Key people: Tilly Loughborough Managing Director (to 2019) Bruno Lancelot (Head of Business Operations)
- Services: Ferry services
- Number of employees: 240
- Parent: Transdev Australasia
- Website: www.transdevbrisbane.com.au

Transdev Brisbane Ferries, formerly Metrolink Queensland and TransdevTSL Brisbane Ferries, was the operator of the CityCat, CityHopper, and Cross River ferry networks on the Brisbane River in Brisbane, Queensland, Australia from November 2003 until November 2020. The network, operated under contract to the Brisbane City Council, formed part of the Translink integrated public transport scheme.

It was succeeded by RiverCity Ferries, who took over operations from 2020.

== History ==
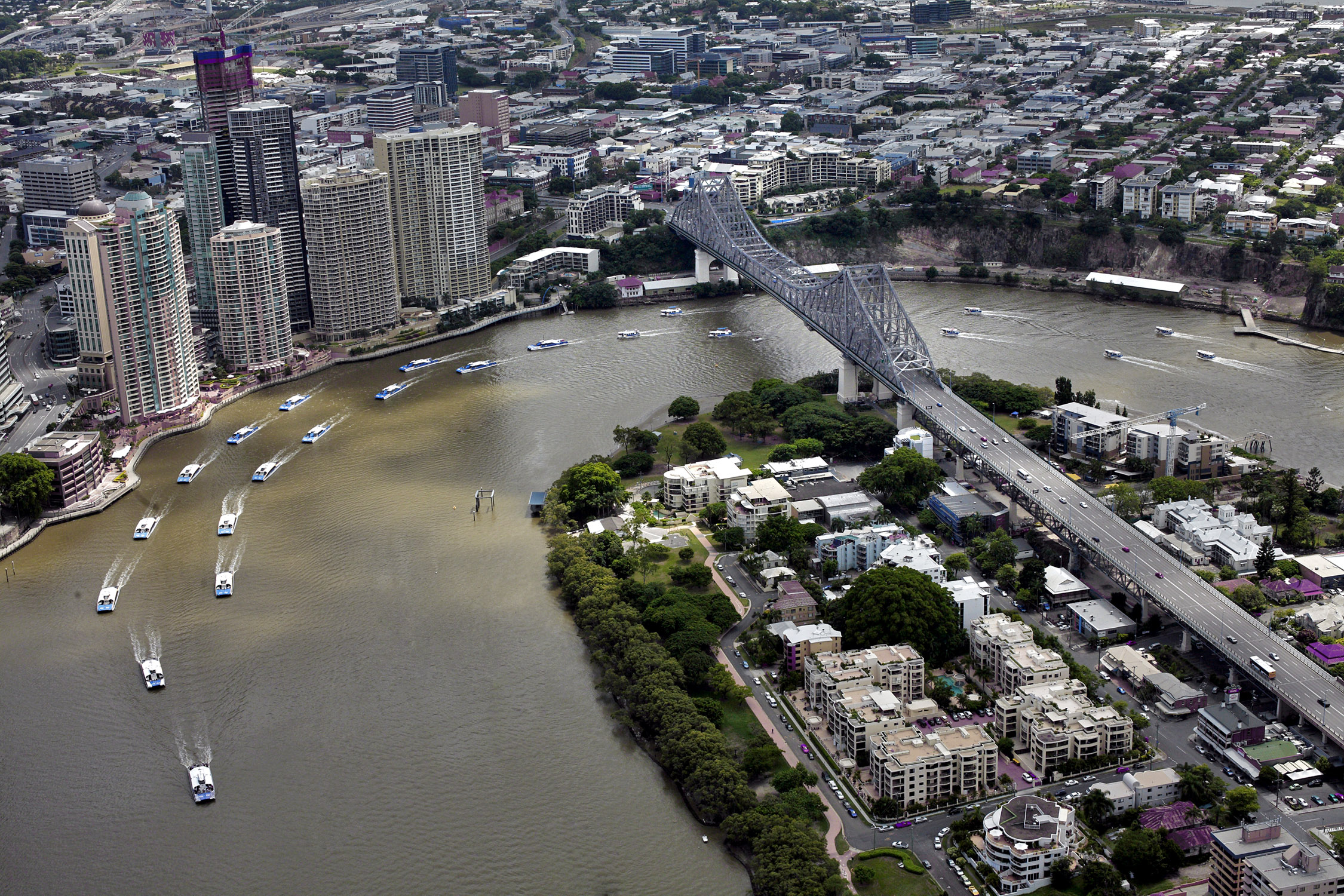
The CityCat and CityFerry flotilla returning to the Brisbane River following the January 2011 floods

In August 1991, River Connections took over the operation of Brisbane City Council's fleet of Cityferries. CityCat services began in November 1996 with six vessels, each capable of carrying 149 passengers, with two further vessels added to the fleet in 1998. In December 1998 services east of Norman Park were withdrawn.

In November 2003, Metrolink Queensland (a joint venture between Transdev and Transfield Services) was contracted to operate CityCat and Cityferry services for seven years.

In 2004, when Translink was established, the first second generation CityCat (Beenung-urrung) was introduced and passenger numbers increased by 26%. Late 2004 saw the restructuring of the Cityferry network which included more late night services. In response to the 31% increase in demand for CityCat services in 2005, another second generation CityCat (Tunamun) was introduced.

In January 2007, services were reinstated to Apollo Road.

In 2008, Metrolink Queensland was rebranded as TransdevTSL Brisbane Ferries, to align with the TransdevTSL branding of Transdev and Transfield joint ventures across Australia. Also in 2008, three new CityCats (Meeandah, Wilwinpa and Ya-wa-gara) were launched and the Apollo Road wharf was reopened. In 2009 and 2010, three new CityCats (Mahreel, Kuluwin and Gootcha) were added to the fleet. Early 2010 saw the introduction of three express services during morning peak times. The second and third generation vessels have a capacity of 162 passengers.

In November 2010, a new contract for 10 years commenced. In December 2010 the joint venture was dissolved with Transfield Services selling its shares to Transdev.

All services were suspended on 10 January 2011 due to severe weather prior to the 2011 Brisbane floods. While the CityCat and ferry fleet escaped damage by mooring downstream at the Rivergate Marina or Manly harbour, much of the infrastructure was damaged or destroyed by the floods, causing services to be cancelled indefinitely. Partial CityCat and CityFerry services recommenced on 14 February 2011, using fifteen repaired wharves. Six of the remaining wharves opened using rescued and repaired pontoons on 18 April 2011.

In 2010, Transfield sold its 50% share in TransdevTSL, and all TransdevTSL operations including Brisbane Ferries became 100% Transdev owned. In March 2011, Transdev merged with Veolia Transport (parent of Veolia Transport Queensland) to form Veolia Transdev.

The upgraded West End was opened at the end of July 2011. A new terminal at Northshore Hamilton opened in October 2011.

In order to revitalise patronage on the inner city ferry route, the council converted it into a free service targeted at tourists in 2012. As part of this change, three of the existing fleet of ferries were painted red to be dedicated to the route, named CityHopper.

In July 2013, Veolia Transdev was renamed back to Transdev (with a different logo). As part of the rebranding, TransdevTSL Brisbane Ferries was rebranded as Transdev Brisbane Ferries, and became a subsidiary of Transdev Australasia.

All CityHopper and CityFerry services were suspended 25 July 2020, due to safety concerns over the ageing fleet. From 7 August CityCats started servicing Holman St.

Transdev Brisbane Ferries ceased operating on 3 November 2020, with the next contract awarded to RiverCity Ferries.

== Services ==
=== CityCat ===
CityCat services operate from UQ St Lucia to Northshore Hamilton calling at West End, Guyatt Park, Regatta, Milton, North Quay, South Bank, QUT Gardens Point, Riverside, Sydney Street, Mowbray Park, New Farm Park, Hawthorne, Bulimba, Teneriffe, Bretts Wharf and Apollo Road. Not all CityCat services stop all stops, with some peak time express services operating.

=== CityHopper ===
CityHopper is an inner city service between North Quay and Sydney Street, stopping at South Bank, Maritime Museum, Thornton Street, Eagle Street Pier, Holman Street and Dockside. CityHopper services were suspended in July 2020 due to deterioration in the hulls of the ferries.

=== Cross River ===
Cross River services operate at three locations.

- Bulimba – Teneriffe
- New Farm Park – Norman Park
- Holman Street – Eagle Street – Thornton Street known as the Kangaroo Point Cross River Service.

Cross River services were suspended in July 2020 due to deterioration in the hulls of the ferries. The Bulimba to Teneriffe service resumed 17 August 2020.

== Fleet ==
As at December 2018, Transdev Brisbane Ferries's fleet consisted of 22 CityCats, 3 CityHoppers and 6 CityFerries. The fleet has grown in size to cater for the significant increase in patronage on CityCat ferry services (by 88% in the last six years). Apart from the support vessels, the fleet is owned by Brisbane City Council and operated by Transdev.

=== CityCat ===
The CityCat vessels are catamarans, and named after the Aboriginal place names for various parts of the Brisbane River and adjacent areas (with the exception of the 19th CityCat, the Spirit of Brisbane, which honours the 2011 flood recovery volunteers). All CityCats are operated by a crew of three - a master, a deck hand and a ticket seller.

On 26 November 2019, Transdev Brisbane Ferries commenced operating the new double-decker CityCat, Yoogera, on behalf of Brisbane City Council. Yoogera is the first of the Fourth Generation CityCats, of which Council plans to introduce 7 by 2023. It is the twenty-second CityCat to be built.

==== First generation ====
First generation CityCats have a capacity of 149 passengers.

| Name | MMSI | Call sign | Builder | Launched | Namesake | Reference | Wrap Theme | Image |
|---|---|---|---|---|---|---|---|---|
| Kurilpa | 503575300 | 11930QE | Brisbane Ship Constructions | November 1996 | West End | | Brisbane City Council's corporate colours of blue, yellow and white | Kurilpa |
| Mirbarpa | 503575600 | 12012QE | Brisbane Ship Constructions | November 1996 | Indooroopilly | | Brisbane City Council's corporate colours of blue, yellow and white | |
| Barrambin | 503575500 | 12013QE | Brisbane Ship Constructions | November 1996 | Breakfast Creek | | Commemoration of 20 Years of CityCat services | |
| Tugulawa | 503575400 | 12014QE | Brisbane Ship Constructions | November 1996 | Bulimba | | Brisbane Bandits baseball team | |
| Mianjin | 503575800 | 12132QE | Brisbane Ship Constructions | December 1996 | Gardens Point | | Brisbane City Council's corporate colours of blue, yellow and white | |
| Binkinba | 503575700 | 12133QE | Brisbane Ship Constructions | December 1996 | New Farm | | Brisbane Bullets basketball team | Binkinba |
| Mooroolbin | 503575900 | 20481QE | Brisbane Ship Constructions | October 1998 | Hamilton Sandbank | | Queensland Maroons State of Origin team | |
| Baneraba | 503576100 | 20854QE | Brisbane Ship Constructions | December 1998 | Toowong | | Brisbane Global Rugby Tens tournament | |

==== Second generation ====
Second generation CityCats have a capacity of 162 passengers.

| Name | MMSI | Call sign | Builder | Launched | Namesake | Reference | Wrap Theme | Image |
|---|---|---|---|---|---|---|---|---|
| Beenung-urrung | 503576200 | 26483QE | Norman R Wright & Sons | August 2004 (sunk on 1 March 2022 due to collision with a houseboat) | Highgate Hill | | Brisbane Lions AFL team | |
| Tunamun | 503576300 | 26579QE | Norman R Wright & Sons | June 2005 | Petrie Bight | | Brisbane Roar Football Club (soccer) | |
| Meeandah | 503576400 | 28744QE | Norman R Wright & Sons | February 2008 | Meeandah | | INAS Global Games 2019 | |
| Wilwinpa | 503576500 | 28744QE | Norman R Wright & Sons | June 2008 | Old Observatory | | Brisbane Heat Twenty20 cricket team | |
| Ya-wa-gara | 503576600 | 27885QE | Norman R Wright & Sons | November 2008 | Breakfast Creek | | ATP Cup tennis tournament | |
| Mahreel | 503576700 | 27885QE | Norman R Wright & Sons | April 2009 | Spring Hill | | Brisbane City Council's corporate colours of blue, yellow and white | |

==== Third generation ====
Third generation CityCats have a capacity of 162 passengers.

| Name | MMSI | Call sign | Builder | Launched | Namesake | Reference | Wrap Theme | Image |
|---|---|---|---|---|---|---|---|---|
| Kuluwin | 503576800 | 29438QE | Norman R Wright & Sons | February 2010 | Wooloowin | | Brisbane City Council's corporate colours of blue, yellow and white | |
| Gootcha | 503576900 | 29440QE | Norman R Wright & Sons | July 2010 | Toowong | | Brisbane City Council's corporate colours of blue, yellow and white | |
| Walan | 503577100 | 29439QE | Norman R Wright & Sons | December 2010 | Herston | | Brisbane City Council's corporate colours of blue, yellow and white | |
| Mudherri | 503577200 | 29437QE | Norman R Wright & Sons | July 2011 | Murarrie | | Queensland Reds rugby union team | Mudherri |
| Spirit of Brisbane | 503586200 | 29436QE | Norman R Wright & Sons | October 2011 | | | Commemorates the city's recovery following the 2011 Brisbane floods. | Spirit of Brisbane |
| Nar-dha | 503017210 | A3K0202 | Norman R Wright & Sons | November 2014 | Nudgee | | The 2014 G20 Brisbane summit | |
| Gilwunpa | 503025670 | 32038QE | Norman R Wright & Sons | June 2015 | Nundah | | Queensland Firebirds | |

==== Fourth generation ====
Two fourth generation CityCats were delivered in 2019/2020. They have a capacity of 170 passengers, including 20 on an open upper deck, plus more space for wheelchairs and bicycles than earlier generations. The vessels which each cost $3.7 million, are being constructed at Murarrie by Aus Ships.

| Name | MMSI | Call sign | Builder | Launched | Namesake | Reference | Wrap Theme | Image |
|---|---|---|---|---|---|---|---|---|
| Yoogera | 503092890 | 456106 | Aus Ships Group | October 2019 | Mouth of Breakfast Creek | | | |
| Neville Bonner | 503102970 | 457882 | Aus Ships Group | August 2020 | Neville Bonner | | | |

=== CityHopper ===
CityHopper is the inner city ferry service. These are powered by 134 kW (180 hp) Scania engines, have a maximum speed of 12 knots (22 km/h; 14 mph) and are operated by a crew of one.

| Name | Call sign | Builder | Launched | Namesake | Passengers | Image |
|---|---|---|---|---|---|---|
| Mermaid | 4372QEC | Norman Park Boat Builders | 1987 | HMS Mermaid (1817), ship used by John Oxley who explored the Brisbane River in December 1823 | 78 | |
| Doomba | 4902QE | Norman R Wright & Sons | 1989 | SS Doomba | 78 | |
| Otter | 4908QE | Norman R Wright & Sons | 1989 | HMQS Otter | 78 | |

=== CityFerry ===
CityFerry covers shorter distance and cross-river services. These are powered by 86 kW (115 hp) Perkins engines, have a maximum speed of 10 knots (19 km/h; 12 mph) and are operated by a crew of one.

| Name | Call sign | Builder | Launched | Namesake | Passengers | Image |
|---|---|---|---|---|---|---|
| Bulimba | | Norman R Wright & Sons | 1984 | Bulimba | 47 | |
| Lucinda | 1185QE | Norman Park Boat Builders | 1986 | Lucinda | 47 | |
| Koopa | 1124QE | Norman Park Boat Builders | 1986 | SS Koopa, the Bribie Island ferry from 1912 to 1963 | 47 | |
| Gayundah | 1283QE | Norman Park Boat Builders | 1986 | HMQS Gayundah | 47 | |
| John Oxley | 6950QE | Norman R Wright & Sons | 1990 | John Oxley | 47 | |
| Kalparrin | 9570QE | Queensland Port Services | 1993 | An Aboriginal word meaning "to help carry a load" | 47 | |

=== Support vessels ===
TransDev owns two support vessels.

| Name | ID | Builder | Launched | Type | Image |
|---|---|---|---|---|---|
| Tenacity | | River Connections | 1991 | Maintenance barge | |
| Tenacious | | Aus Boats | 1993 | Fuel barge | |

== Ferry network ==
The wharves are given in geographical order, heading upstream along the Brisbane River.

| Wharf | Stopping pattern SE = SpeedyCat Express (weekday peak) CC = CityCat CH = CityHopper CF = CityFerry (cross river) | | | | | | Connections |
| Wharf | SE | CC | CH | CF | CF | CF | Connections |
|---|---|---|---|---|---|---|---|
| Northshore Hamilton | ● | ● | | | | | Bus transport |
| Apollo Road | | ● | | | | | Bus transport |
| Bretts Wharf | | ● | | | | | Bus transport |
| Bulimba | | ● | | ● | | | Bus transport |
| Teneriffe | ● | ● | | ● | | | Blue CityGlider |
| Hawthorne | ● | ● | | | | | Bus transport |
| New Farm Park | | ● | | | ● | | |
| Norman Park | | | | | ● | | |
| Mowbray Park | | ● | | | | | |
| Sydney Street | | ● | ● | | | | |
| Dockside | | | ● | | | | |
| Howard Smith Wharves | Construction commences late 2020 | | | | | | |
| Holman Street | | | ● | | | ● | |
| Riverside | ● | ● | | | | | |
| Eagle Street Pier | | | ● | | | ● | Bus transport |
| Thornton Street | | | ● | | | ● | |
| Maritime Museum | | | ● | | | | |
| South Bank 3 | | | ● | | | | |
| QUT Gardens Point | | ● | | | | | |
| South Bank 1 & 2 | | ● | | | | | |
| North Quay | ● | ● | ● | | | | |
| Milton | | ● | | | | | Bus transport |
| Regatta | | ● | | | | | Bus transport |
| Guyatt Park | ● (Note: SpeedyCat Express services only stop at West End and Guyatt Park in CBD peak flow direction) | ● | | | | | |
| West End | ● | ● | | | | | Blue CityGlider |
| UQ St Lucia | ● | ● | | | | | UQ Lakes busway station |

=== Wharf damage ===
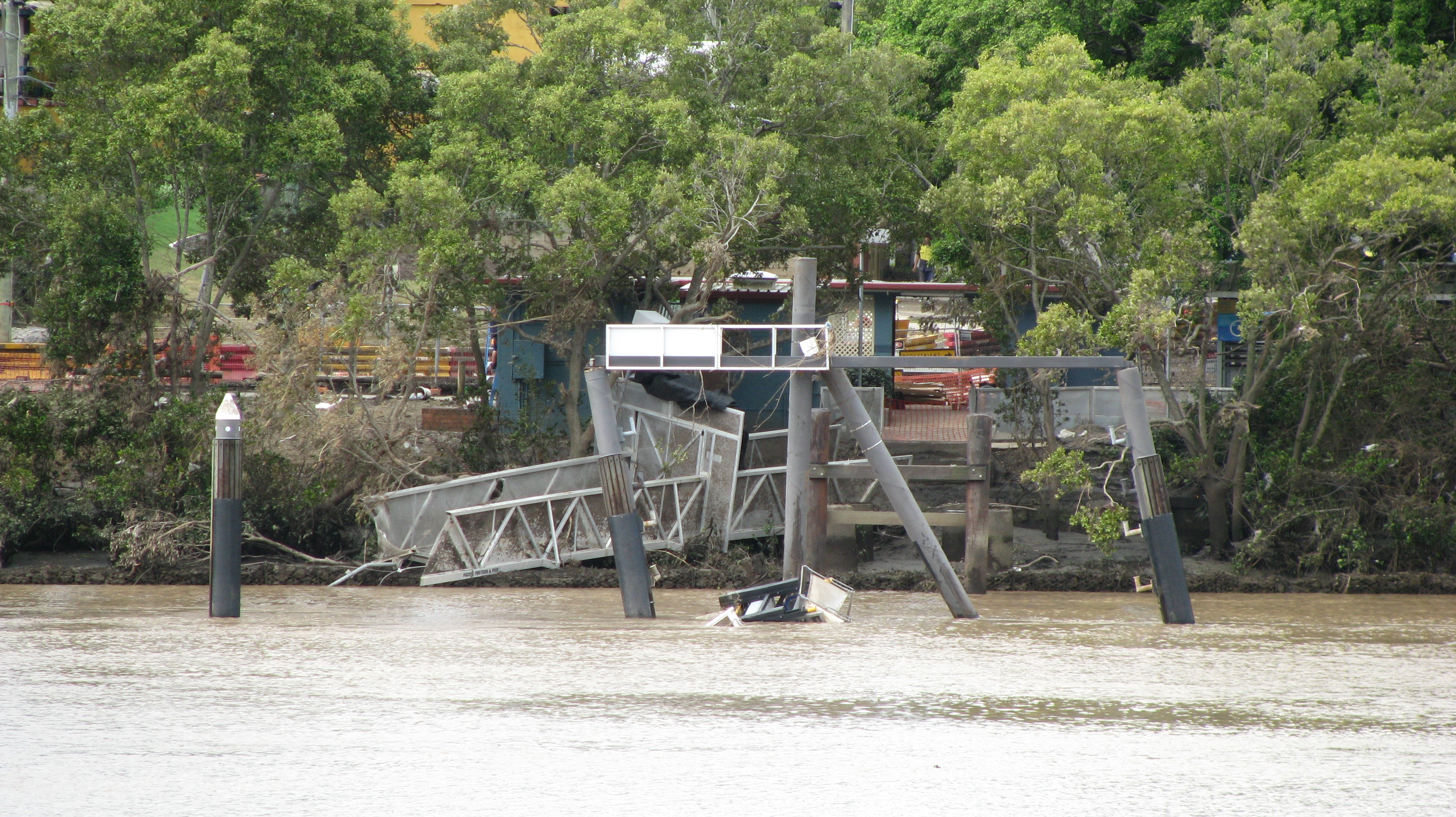
Damaged West End ferry wharf, 2011

In January 2011, all of the wharves were damaged or destroyed during the Brisbane floods and the services were suspended indefinitely. Ten wharves had minor damage (Bretts Wharf, Apollo Road, Teneriffe, Bulimba, Hawthorne, New Farm Park, Mowbray Park, Dockside, Riverside, Guyatt Park), six had moderate damage (Norman Park, Eagle Street Pier, Thornton Street, River Plaza, South Bank 3, South Bank 1 & 2) and seven required rebuilding (Sydney Street, Holman Street, QUT Gardens Point, North Quay, Regatta, West End, University of Queensland). No ferries were lost.

It was expected that the infrastructure repairs would take months to replace. Temporary facilities were operating at most terminals by mid-April 2011.

== See also ==
- Transport in Brisbane
