= Thornton Street ferry wharf =

Ferry wharf in Brisbane

Thornton Street
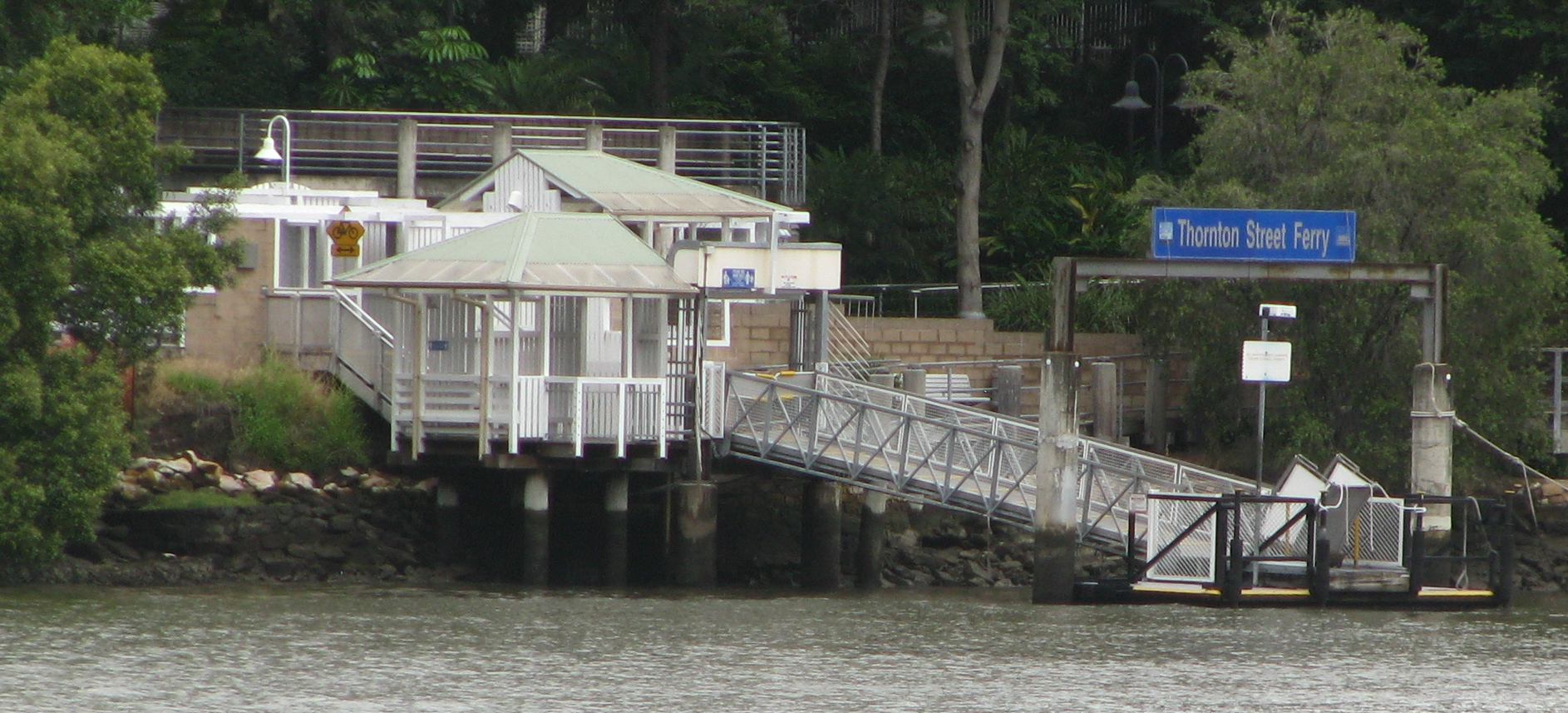

General information
- Location: Thornton Street, Kangaroo Point; Australia
- Coordinates: 27.4712°S 153.0342°E
- Owner: Brisbane City Council
- Operator: Transdev Brisbane Ferries
- Platforms: 1

Other information
- Station code: 317579
- Fare zone: go card 1

Services
Preceding wharf	RiverCity Ferries	Following wharf
Former services
Maritime Museum towards North Quay	CityHopper	Eagle Street Pier towards Sydney Street
Terminus	Cross River Ferries–Kangaroo Point	Eagle Street Pier towards Holman Street
Location

Thornton Street ferry wharf was a ferry terminal located on the southern side of the Brisbane River serving the Brisbane suburb of Kangaroo Point in Queensland, Australia. It was served by Transdev Brisbane Ferries' CityHopper service and the cross-river service to Eagle Street Pier in the Brisbane central business district. These services were suspended in July 2020 and the wharf was permanently closed in October 2020.

== History ==
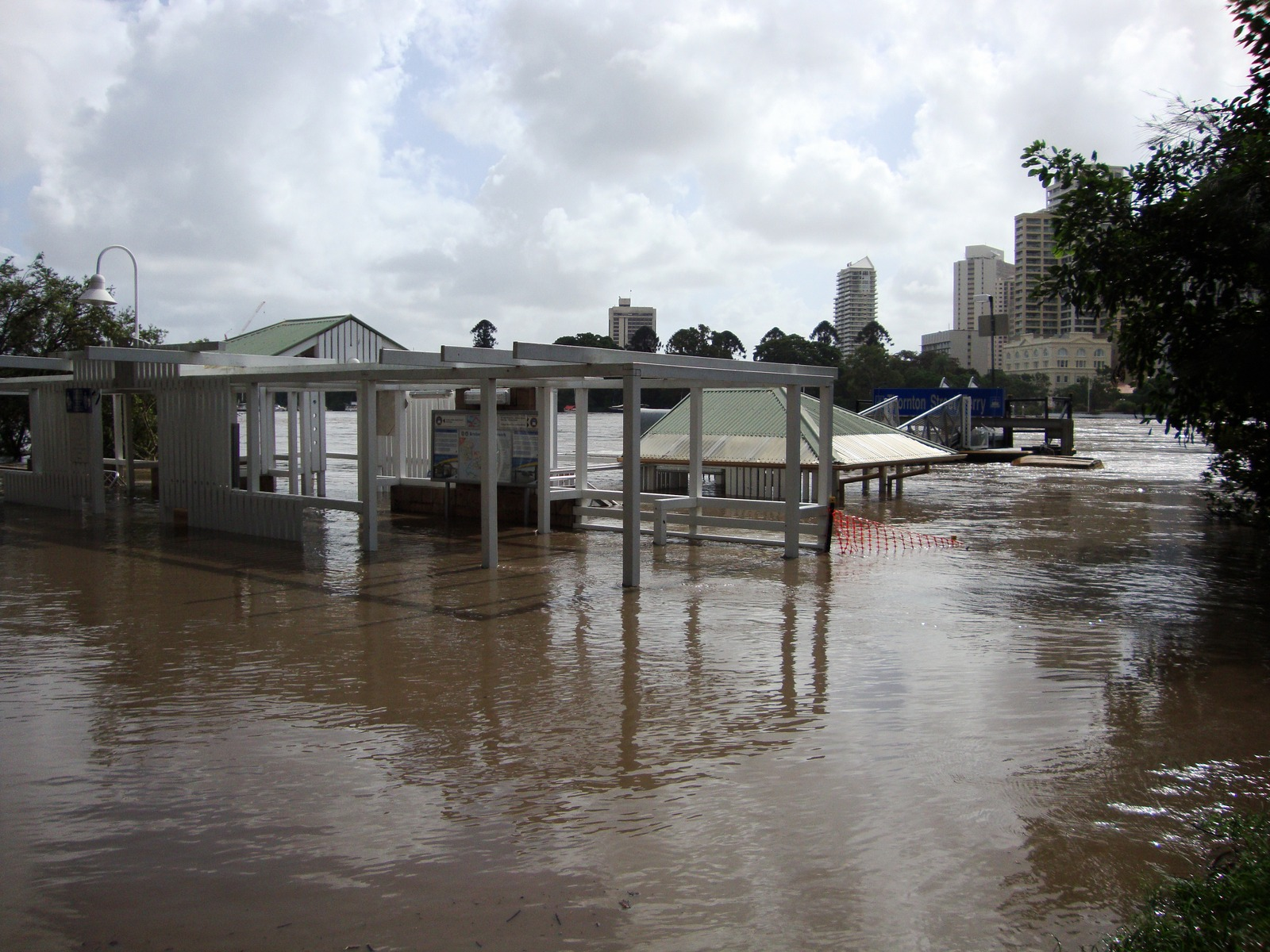
Inundation of the Thornton Street ferry terminal Kangaroo Point Brisbane during the January 2011 flood

A ferry service from Edward Street to Thornton Street was established in 1858.

The wharf sustained moderate damage during the January 2011 Brisbane floods. It reopened after repairs on 14 February 2011.

Services to the wharf were suspended in July 2020 and wharf was permanently closed in October 2020.

== In popular culture ==
This ferry terminal was used as a filming location during Season 3 of the Australian Crime Drama Harrow. It had already closed to the public by the time it was used for filming.
