= Glenugie =

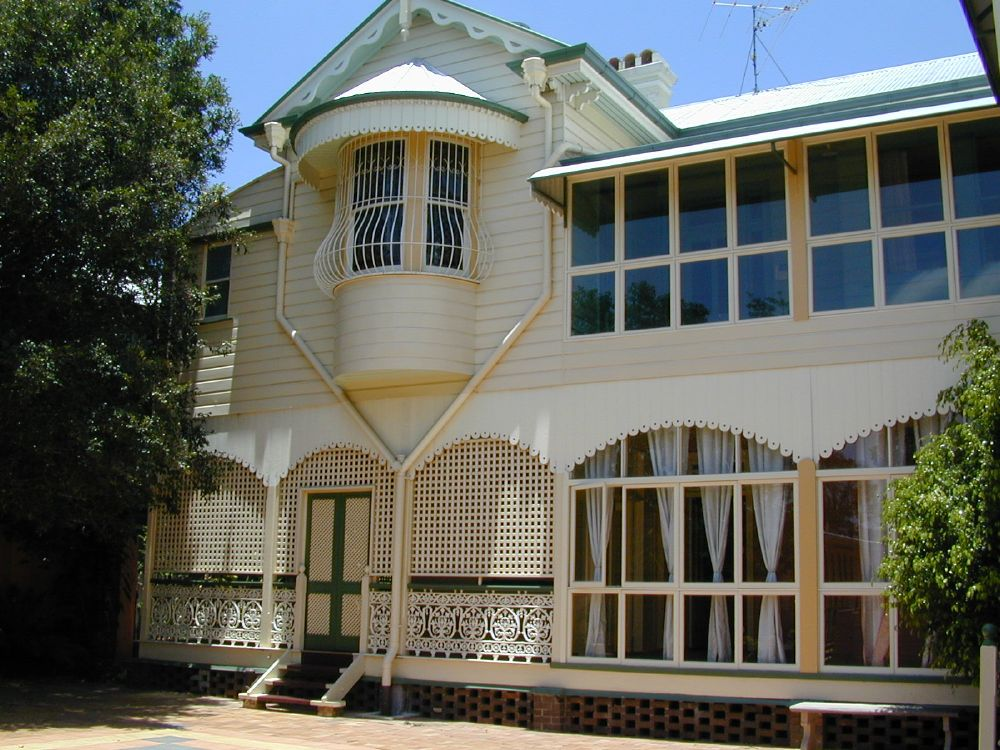
- Glenugie, 2003

- Location within Queensland Location within Australia
- 27.4708°S 153.0443°E
- Location: 186 Moray Street, New Farm, City of Brisbane, Queensland, Australia

History
- Design period: 1870s–1890s (late 19th century)
- Built: 1884–85

Queensland Heritage Register
- Official name: Glenugie, Archibald House
- Type: state heritage (built, landscape)
- Designated: 21 October 1992
- Reference no.: 600262
- Significant period: 1880s, 1940s (fabric); 1880s, 1930–80, 1940s (historical); 1930–80 (social)
- Significant components: service wing, air raid shelter, residential accommodation – main house, garden/grounds

Glenugie is a heritage-listed villa at 186 Moray Street, New Farm, City of Brisbane, Queensland, Australia. It was built from 1884 to 1885. It is also known as Archibald House. It was added to the Queensland Heritage Register on 21 October 1992.

== History ==
Evidence indicates that Glenugie, a two-storeyed timber house, was probably built in 1886–87 on land owned by Mary Barret. Its first recorded resident was M. Davis, a commercial traveller, who lived there until 1888.

In that year Thomas Mooney, a successful Brisbane butcher, moved in and he bought the property in 1890. In 1902 Glenugie was sold to the Hon. John Archibald, the proprietor of the Dominion Milling Company and a Member of the Queensland Legislative Council. After Archibald's death in 1907, it remained the home of his widow until 1929.

In May 1929, the Archibald family gave Glenugie to the Presbyterian and Methodist Churches for use as a girls hostel known as Archibald House. After some remodelling, the hostel opened in July 1930. In 1980 it was sold and refurbished as a private home.

== Description ==
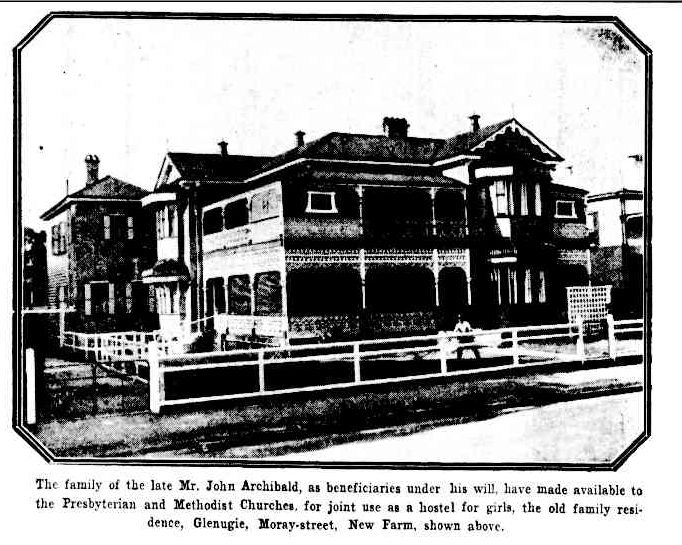
Glenugie, New Farm, 1930

Glenugie is a large two-storeyed timber house with a substantial double storey kitchen wing at the rear, attached by a verandah. The house sits on low brick piers linked by honeycomb infill brick screens.

There are double verandahs on all four sides and along the eastern side of the kitchen wing. While the front and side verandahs have cast-iron posts, balusters and valances, the back and kitchen wing verandahs have been enclosed with hopper windows.

There are two double storey gabled projections which interrupt the verandahs on the front and western elevations, and a single one on the upper floor at the rear. These have bay windows with elaborate awnings and timber valances, and pierced barge boards on the gables. The hipped roof of corrugated iron incorporates the three gables, two chimneys and numerous ventilators.

The external walls of the house are chamferboard while internal walls and ceilings are lined with beaded pine boards and feature cedar joinery.

== Heritage listing ==
Glenugie was listed on the Queensland Heritage Register on 21 October 1992 having satisfied the following criteria.

The place is important in demonstrating the evolution or pattern of Queensland's history.

As an unusual timber version of the large two-storey verandahed houses fashionable in the 1880s.

For its projecting gables, ornate verandah treatment and the exclusive use of timber for both interior and exterior walls which contribute to a composition pleasing in design, scale and detail.

As a rare surviving example of the large houses built in New Farm in the late nineteenth century.

The place demonstrates rare, uncommon or endangered aspects of Queensland's cultural heritage.

As an unusual timber version of the large two-storey verandahed houses fashionable in the 1880s.

As a rare surviving example of the large houses built in New Farm in the late nineteenth century.

The place is important because of its aesthetic significance.

For its projecting gables, ornate verandah treatment and the exclusive use of timber for both interior and exterior walls which contribute to a composition pleasing in design, scale and detail.
