= Cairnsville =

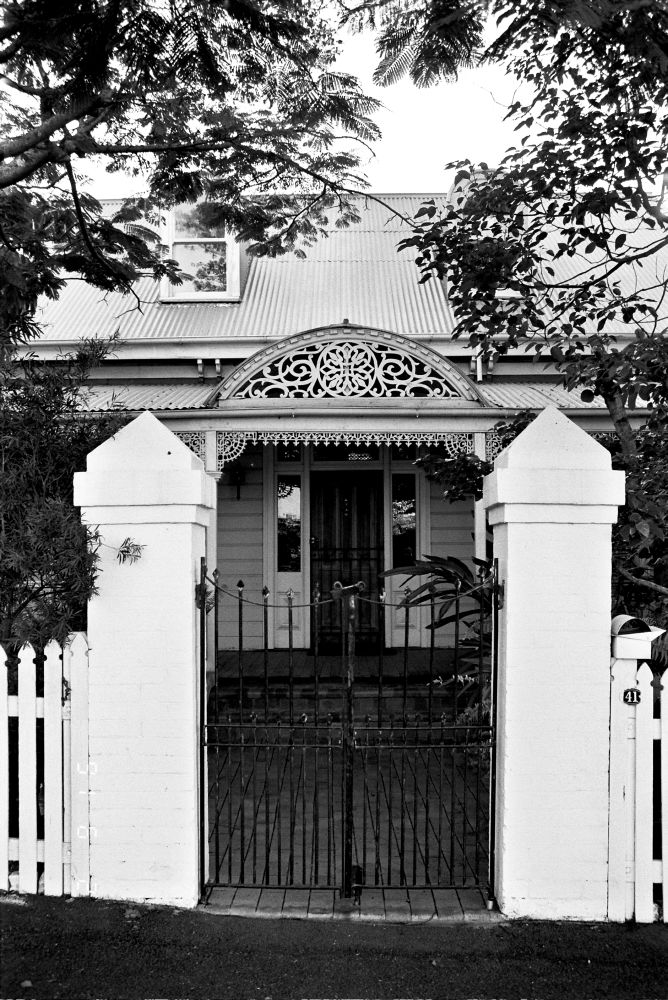
- Cairnsville, 1991

- Location within Queensland Location within Australia
- 27.4639°S 153.0402°E
- Location: 41 Balfour Street, New Farm, City of Brisbane, Queensland, Australia

History
- Design period: 1870s–1890s (late 19th century)
- Built: c. 1889

Site notes
- Architect: Richard Gailey

Queensland Heritage Register
- Official name: Cairnsville
- Type: state heritage (built)
- Designated: 21 October 1992
- Reference no.: 600259
- Significant period: 1880s (fabric); 1880s–1890s (historical)
- Significant components: kitchen/kitchen house, residential accommodation – main house, attic
- Builders: Charles Le Brocq

Cairnsville is a heritage-listed detached house at 41 Balfour Street, New Farm, City of Brisbane, Queensland, Australia. It was designed by Richard Gailey and built c. 1889 by Charles Le Brocq. It was added to the Queensland Heritage Register on 21 October 1992.

== History ==
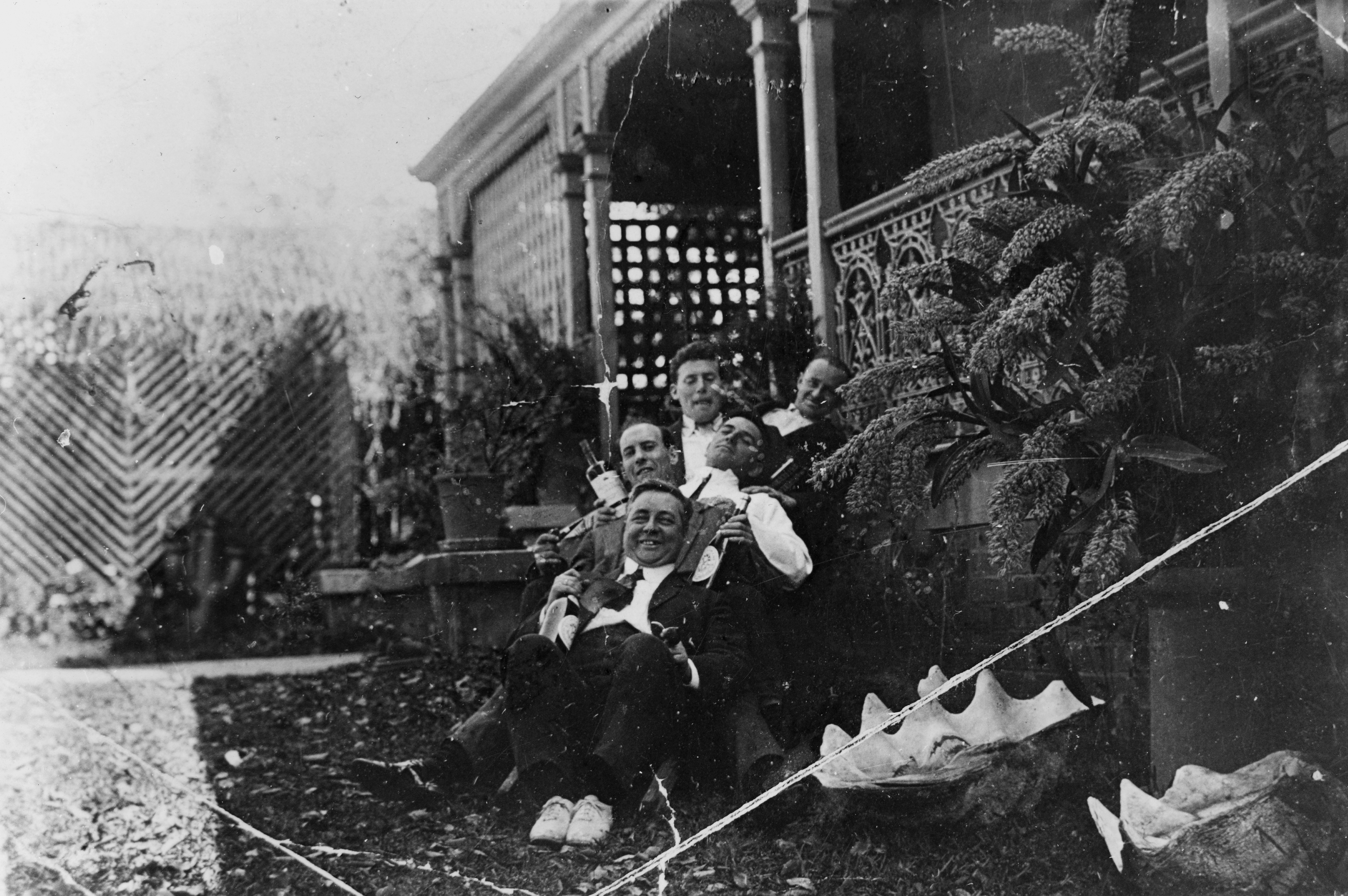
Members of the Le Brocq family in the garden of Cairnsville, 1911

Cairnsville is a single-storeyed timber house built in 1889. It was designed by Richard Gailey, the notable architect, for Charles le Brocq, a prominent builder, local landowner and floating baths proprietor who retained the house as a rental property for professional tenants.

Its first occupant was Albert Victor Drury, a brother of Edward Drury, the general manager of the Queensland National Bank. He was the clerk of the executive council from 1867 to 1904, and private secretary to Queensland Governor William Cairns from 1875 to 1877. Drury named the house in memory of this recently deceased governor.

In 1897 Drury left Cairnsville, which has had a number of owners and tenants in succeeding years, including a period as a boarding house.

However, through much of the 1900s, the Le Brocq family occupied the house.

== Description ==
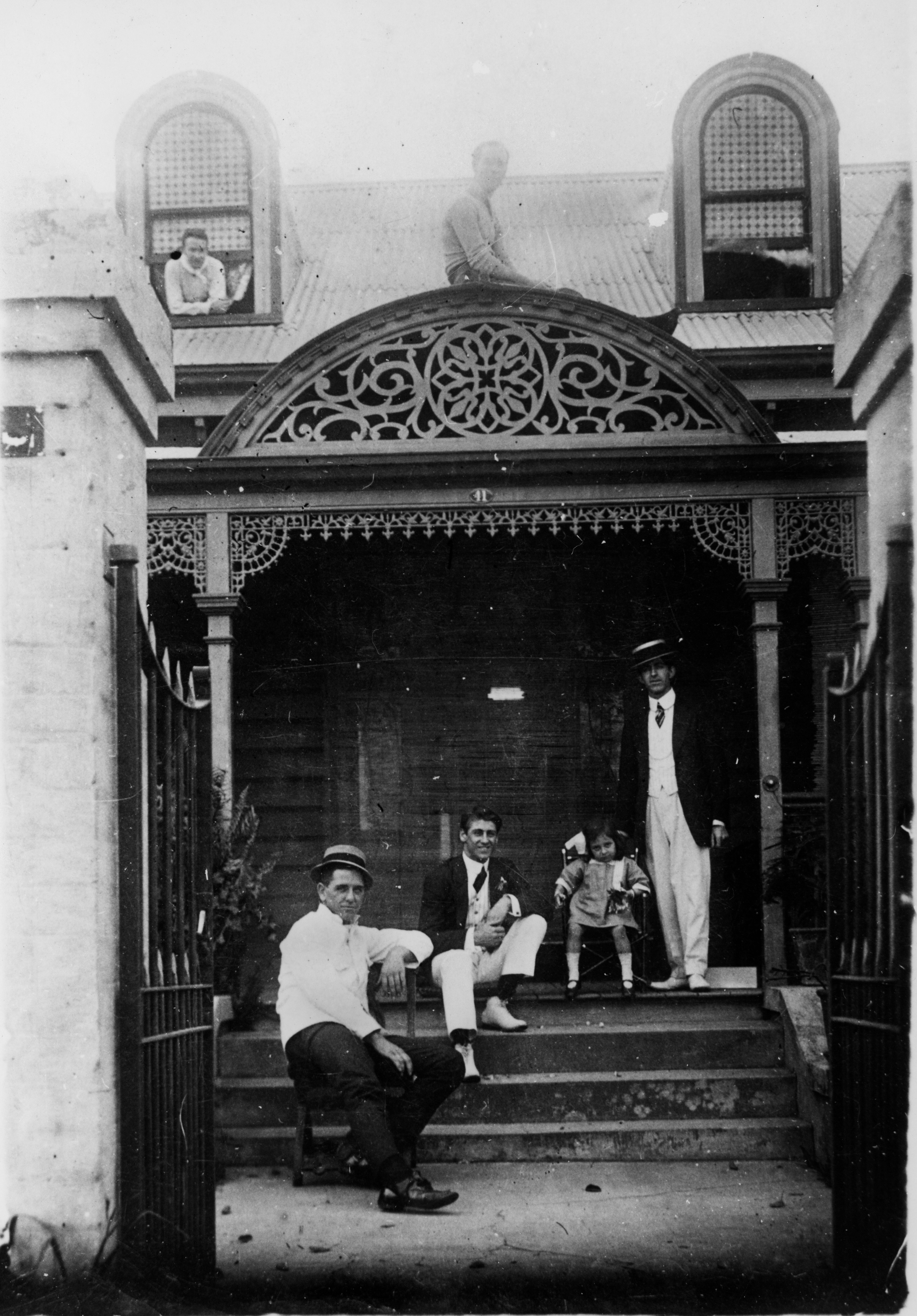
Fretwork entrance at Cairnsville, 1911

Cairnsville is a gable roofed, single-storeyed timber house of the colonial era, with a kitchen wing extending off the rear. It sits on timber stumps which are lowset at the front, but highset at the rear.

The corrugated iron roof features two dormer windows with semi-circular tank roofs, as well as a window in each gable. The verandah across the front and down the right side of the house has timber posts with cast-iron balusters, brackets and valances. The entrance is marked by a fretwork pediment, beyond which is the panelled front door with leadlight fan and sidelights.

French doors with shutters open out from the rooms onto the verandahs. A large drawing room and dining room, linked by folding doors, are located on the right side of the central hallway, and three bedrooms are on the left. A substantial staircase leads to two attic bedrooms. The kitchen and other service rooms are located in the highset wing at the rear. The subfloor of this wing has been enclosed in brick to create a poolside entertainment area.

== Heritage listing ==
Cairnsville was listed on the Queensland Heritage Register on 21 October 1992 having satisfied the following criteria.

The place is important in demonstrating the evolution or pattern of Queensland's history.

A late example of the Colonial Gable style and includes unusual features such as a substantial staircase and the rounded roofs of the dormers.

One of a number of moderate sized timber houses built in New Farm in the late nineteenth century as rental accommodation for the professional classes.

Associated with Richard Gailey, Albert Victor Drury and Governor William Cairns.

The place is important in demonstrating the principal characteristics of a particular class of cultural places.

One of a number of moderate sized timber houses built in New Farm in the late nineteenth century as rental accommodation for the professional classes.

The place is important because of its aesthetic significance.

A late example of the Colonial Gable style and includes unusual features such as a substantial staircase and the rounded roofs of the dormers.

The place has a special association with the life or work of a particular person, group or organisation of importance in Queensland's history.

Associated with Richard Gailey, Albert Victor Drury and Governor William Cairns.
