= New Farm Cinemas =

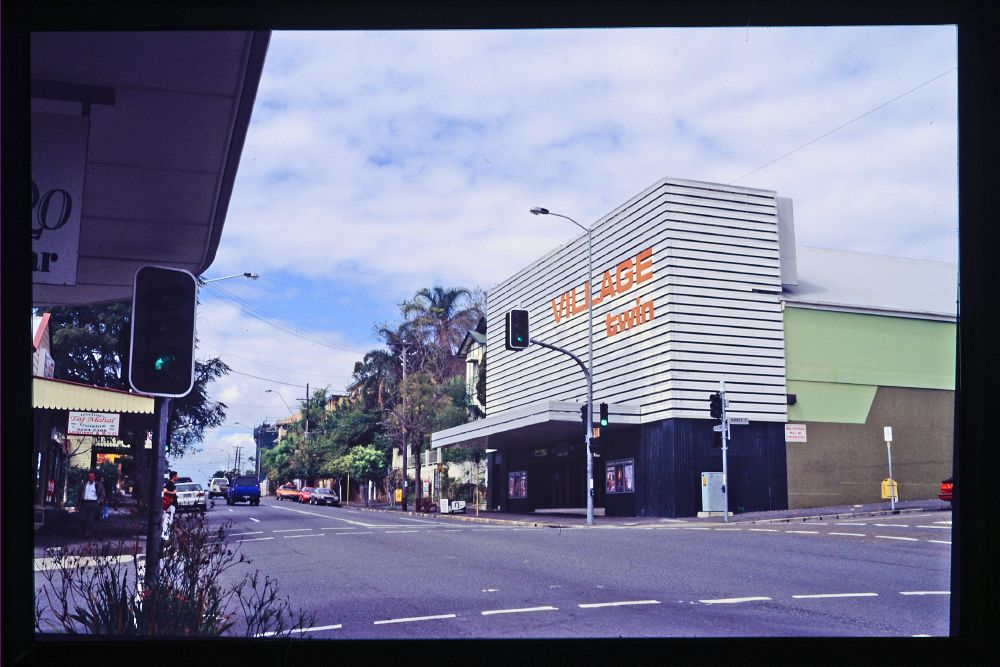
- Village Twin Cinemas exterior, 1999

- Location within Queensland Location within Australia
- 27.4649°S 153.0426°E
- Location: 701 Brunswick Street, New Farm, City of Brisbane, Queensland, Australia

History
- Design period: 1919–1930s (interwar period)
- Built: c. 1921–1970

Queensland Heritage Register
- Official name: Village Twin Cinemas, Astor Theatre, Merthyr Picture Palace, Village Twin Cinema Complex
- Type: state heritage (built)
- Designated: 24 March 2000
- Reference no.: 602101
- Significant period: c. 1921, 1924, 1937, 1970 (fabric); 1921–ongoing (social)
- Significant components: auditorium, foyer – entrance, projection booth/bio box

New Farm Cinemas is a cinema at 701 Brunswick Street, New Farm, City of Brisbane, Queensland, Australia. It was first built c. 1921. It is also known as Astor Theatre, Merthyr Picture Palace, and Village Twin Cinema Complex. While not heritage-listed itself, the New Farm Cinemas redevelopment has retained elements of the heritage-listed Village Twin Cinema, which was added to the Queensland Heritage Register on 24 March 2000.

== History ==
The Village Twin at New Farm opened in late 1970, was the first twin cinema complex in Queensland and one of the earliest multi-screen cinemas in Australia. It was a renovation of the popular Astor Theatre, established as the Merthyr Picture Palace c. 1921, on the same site at the corner of Brunswick and Barker Streets.

The site – part of a larger parcel of land alienated in 1845 - had been subdivided by 1880 as a residential allotment of 44 perches (1,100 m^{2}), and a cottage, fronting Barker Street and Oxley Lane, appears to have been extant by 1883. There does not appear to have been any development of the northern end of this block prior to approval being granted by the Brisbane City Council in September 1921, for Mousley & Halliday of New Farm to erect a picture show with concrete and iron walls at the corner of Barker and Brunswick Streets. Known as the Merthyr Picture Palace, the theatre was functioning by 1923 at least, and probably opened in late 1921.

The Merthyr Picture Palace was the third picture theatre established in New Farm, which in the early 20th century was one of Brisbane's most closely settled suburbs, particularly north of Brunswick Street. The Earls Court Picture Theatre, one of the earliest picture shows in Brisbane, operated at the corner of Brunswick and Kent Streets from c. 1912 and was renovated as the Rivoli Picture Theatre c. 1920. The Colosseum Picture Theatre was established c. 1918 at 528 Brunswick Street [near the corner of Harcourt Street], but appears to have folded in the early 1920s. All three theatres were established along the principal street of New Farm, in close proximity to each other in the heart of the suburb. Competition amongst early suburban picture show exhibitors was strong, and despite the enormous popularity of moving pictures, only the Merthyr Picture Palace (remodelled as the Astor Theatre in 1924) survived the introduction of sound films in the late 1920s and the economic depression of the early 1930s.

Richard Francis Stephens and Charles Eric Munro, who established one of Brisbane's most successful suburban interwar picture theatre chains, had acquired an interest in the Merthyr Picture Palace by at least 1924, when they commissioned Brisbane architect Claude E Humphreys to design additions and alterations to the theatre. Humphreys undertook a number of picture theatre commissions around this time, including theatres at Toowong and Kelvin Grove, and the front facades he designed were ornate fantasies in vaguely "Mediterranean" style. Brisbane City Council approval for the renovations to the Merthyr Picture Palace was gained in September 1924, and it is likely the alterations had been completed by the end of the year. The 1924 facade to the Astor Theatre changed little until the 1970 reconstruction, despite an impressive £7,000 renovation of the theatre undertaken in 1937 to the design of architect George Rae, which provided a seating capacity of 1,145.

Stephens & Munro, exhibiting at the Astor as Merthyr Theatres [Pty] Ltd for over 45 years, developed the Astor as one of the most successful suburban picture theatres in Brisbane. From the 1920s to the 1950s, moving-going was a popular recreational pastime. Suburban picture theatres, many of which had elaborate street facades, were local landmarks and provided a focus for local social activity. Theatre proprietors were local identities, and knew their patrons by name. Their audiences, most of whom lived within walking distance, dressed for the occasion and made regular bookings to ensure good seats.

Following the introduction of television to Brisbane in the late 1950s, cinema attendance declined steadily. The introduction of wide screens, technicolour and superior sound systems failed to halt this worldwide trend, and many of Brisbane's suburban theatres closed in the 1960s and 1970s. From the 1950s, the larger exhibition chains countered the loss of "hardtop" audiences with the construction of drive-in movie theatres. Another approach, pioneered in Australia in Melbourne in the 1960s, was to create multi-screen cinemas within the shells of existing single auditorium theatres. The first of these multi-screen adaptations appears to have been the State Theatre in Melbourne, which was remodelled into two separate theatres, the Forum and the Rapallo, in the early 1960s. Later in the decade, Village Theatres commissioned Melbourne architects Ron G Monsborough and Associates to convert the former Rivoli Cinema at Camberwell into the Rivoli Twin Cinemas.

In mid-1969, Verdun Richard Stephens and Douglas Francis Stephens, took out a 10-year lease on the Astor Theatre from Merthyr Theatres Pty Ltd, but it appears that the following year the cinema was sold to Village Theatres (Brisbane) Proprietary Limited, a Melbourne-based exhibition company, with both the lease of the theatre and title to the site transferred to the new owners in 1971.

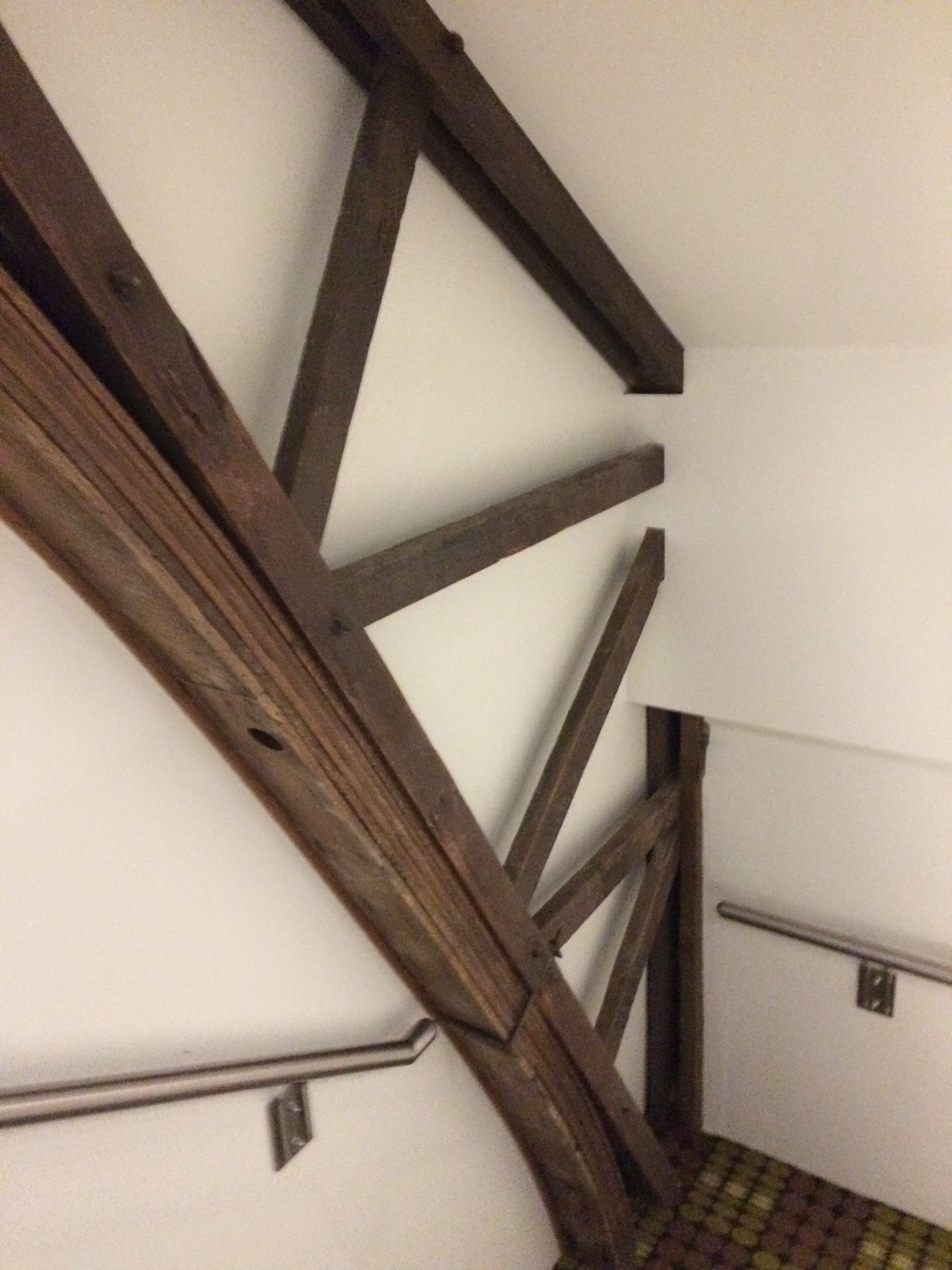
Early curved timber truss remain visible in the New Farm Cinemas, 2015

In 1970, Village Theatres commissioned Ron G Monsborough and Associates to design a twin cinema complex within the existing space of the Astor Theatre. Administration of the contract was handled by the Brisbane architectural firm of Briggs, Peterson & Burnett. The Astor Theatre remodelling was Village Theatres' first Queensland venture and second twin cinema complex, and possibly the third multi-screen cinema to be constructed in Australia. In the conversion, Monsborough economically adapted the existing volume of the early cinema to create two smaller yet spacious theatres under the one roof. The cinemas are located back-to-back with a shared projection box between them. Drawings from the 1970 conversion indicate that the new ceilings were fixed to the existing curved, timber truss. These trusses were distinctive to Queensland theatre design and it is understood that few remain in Brisbane.

The Telegraph described Ron Monsborough as "acknowledged as a leading Australian cinema design architect" and that the Village Twin "is the best example of his outstanding ability in this field." In the late 1960s, Monsborough had travelled to the US, Canada, Europe and the Far East to study cinema design. He was the architect for the Village Theatres Group and still practices as a consultant in cinema design. Monsborough also designed the conversion of the former Metro Theatre in Albert Street in 1973 into the three screen Albert Cinemas.

Promoted as "a new concept in cinema entertainment", the Village Twin opened on 26 December 1970. Cinema One (The Blue Room) had a seating capacity of 555, and Cinema Two (The Purple Room) could seat 352. The complex included a coffee lounge and mini art gallery, and the whole was considered ultra-modern in both design and decoration. Of particular note was Cinema One, described by one movie reviewer of the day as "a beautiful sea-blue auditorium, with a roof which makes one think of white coral". It was the first cinema to have wall-to-wall carpeting and the luxurious qualities of the complex were strongly emphasised in the press at the time. Special features in the foyer included a fountain and wall-mounted, beaten copper Gemini figures which symbolised the twin aspects of the complex.

The re-modelling of the cinema also reflected current concepts in cinema programming and marketing. The intention at the time of opening was that the larger Cinema One would feature popular, box office successes with wide audience appeal whilst the smaller Cinema Two would screen contemporary films with a more limited public appeal. The then general manager Bruce Simpson said that the "complex is directed at the sophisticated young people of the city ... but would not alienate those of a more conservative outlook". The Village Twin maintained a reputation for screening quality and art-house films. In the early 1980s Cinema Two was leased by the Valhalla group, which operated cinemas in Melbourne and Sydney and screened principally revivals and non-mainstream film.

From at least 1984, Edenfile Pty Ltd held a half interest with Village Theatres in the Village Twin Cinemas. In August 1999, Melbourne-based Palace Cinemas bought Edenfile's 50% shareholding, thus completing a Palace cinema network in all Australian capitals.

The cinemas were closed in 2003, Palace having opened another Brisbane cinema in Fortitude Valley in 2000, and the building sat abandoned for several years. The cinemas deteriorated to a poor condition, and were the subject of demolition fears, especially when the 1970 Blue Room auditorium at the rear of the building was demolished in 2011 for safety reasons. It was acquired by Peter and Stephen Sourris, owners of the Yatala Drive-In Theatre, in February 2013. The new owners restored the surviving portions of the theatre, and extended it from a two-screen to a six-screen theatre. The first stage, with the restored Purple Room and new Bronze Room, opened on 1 August 2014 as the New Farm Cinemas, with the remaining four cinemas opening in December 2014.

== Description of Village Twin Cinemas (1970–2003) ==
The Village Twin was located on the corner of Brunswick and Barker Streets, New Farm and bordered by Oxley Lane at the rear.

=== Exterior ===
The exterior form was largely that of the former Astor Theatre and comprised rendered masonry walls with a large gabled roof sheeted in corrugated iron. Entry to the cinema was from Brunswick Street, with fire exits to the lane and Barker Street.

The upper part of the front facade was painted black and screened with white aluminium strips fixed horizontally to a supporting framework which is attached to the original facade. Large orange lettering designed in the style of the Village corporate logo from the 1970s was affixed to the upper right hand corner. The top of the gable was visible behind this facade.

The lower portion of the front wall was tiled with deep-green enamel finish ceramic tiles, which also wrapped around the Barker Street corner. The profile of the tiled section was such that the engaged piers of the original facade were distinguishable. Five double glass doors led into a wide set of stairs up to the foyer. The opening, which was the same proportions as that of the Astor, was surmounted by a timber panelled bulkhead with downlighting. On each side of the entry doors, three glass display cabinets were set into the tiled walls with posters of current and forthcoming attractions. A cantilevered awning lined alternately with aluminium strips and fluorescent lighting projected over the street. This lighting effect was intended to assist the transition from the dark interior of the foyer to the brightness of the street.

The Barker Street facade was blank and painted in two tone olive green paint, in line with the upward slope of the street. There was evidence of an early concrete wall, the silhouette of panelled areas being discernible in the upper section of the wall and the configuration of the downpipes appeared to be the same as for the Astor.

=== Foyers ===
As a whole, the interior was remarkably demonstrative of the early 1970s, the period in which the cinema was refurbished as a twin complex. The foyer is stepped, not unlike the grand picture palaces of the interwar period where entry into the cinema was staged to heighten the experience of arrival. The foyer had upper and lower areas with a consistent decorative scheme throughout. The cinemas were located above the foyers and are arranged back-to-back with a shared projection room between them.

The lower foyer was extensive, with interior finishes of dark brown brick and horizontal timber panelling stained dark brown; the ceiling was also lined with the same dark timber. This theme is continued through to rubbish bins, ashtrays and display units which are made of the same timber with strong horizontal design elements and aluminium details. Boxed, timber pelmet lighting ran along the walls throughout both the upper and lower foyers and the stairs. The foyer space was arranged symmetrically with staircases of identical detailing on either side of the centrally located ticket office. The ticket office was located in the space beneath the stairs to Cinema Two (which was previously occupied by a fountain and decorative light fitting). Bold geometric carpet with a pattern of purple, green and blue circles and ellipses in a black background covered the floor throughout the entire foyer area, including the stairs.

A large alcove that formerly housed a coffee shop and art gallery ran along the right hand side of the lower foyer. A servery area with kitchen remained but was no longer used. A long banquette upholstered in bright blue vinyl and wool ran along the Barker Street wall and a number of chairs and tables were positioned here. On the opposite side of the foyer there was a door which led to the manager's office and store room. Adjacent to this is the space where the ticket office was formerly located but was panelled with horizontal timber, consistent with the rest of the interior. Signage throughout the foyer was composed of bronze, metallic lettering mounted directly onto timber elements such as doors.

The stairs to the upper foyer were solid, with rectangular wall mounted timber handrails cut at an angle at each end. The central handrail had minimal balusters, again emphasising the horizontality of the timber detailing throughout the interior. Entrances to the cinemas were located opposite each other in the upper foyer. Each entrance had a pair of heavy timber double doors recessed into vestibule spaces for the stairs leading up into the auditoria. Bronze, metallic lettering announcing Cinema One The Blue Room and Cinema Two The Purple Room were situated above the doors, mirroring each other. The upper foyer was dominated by a large but delicate, crystalline hanging light fitting located in the centre of the ceiling. Two purple vinyl benches and two small cafe tables with chairs were located in the upper foyer.

The candy bar was located on the Barker Street side of the foyer. An office, which was previously part of the coffee shop, was next to the candy bar at a level between the upper and lower foyers with small sets of steps between the two. Doors to both male and female toilets were opposite the candy bar. The doors were timber panelled consistent with the rest of the interior and had the same style signage. The female toilets retained a separate powder room area with a small vinyl covered bench and large mirrors on the far wall. Toilet cubicles and benchtops were terrazzo of a neutral colour. The male toilets hada large vestibule with a wall mounted copper sculpture hung against a bright yellow wall. The toilet partitions were also terrazzo.

Steep stairs led to the cinema auditoria. The contrast between the sleek, dark style of the foyers and the vivid profusion of light and colour in the cinemas intensified the sense of escapism and fantasy common to much cinema design.

=== Blue Room ===
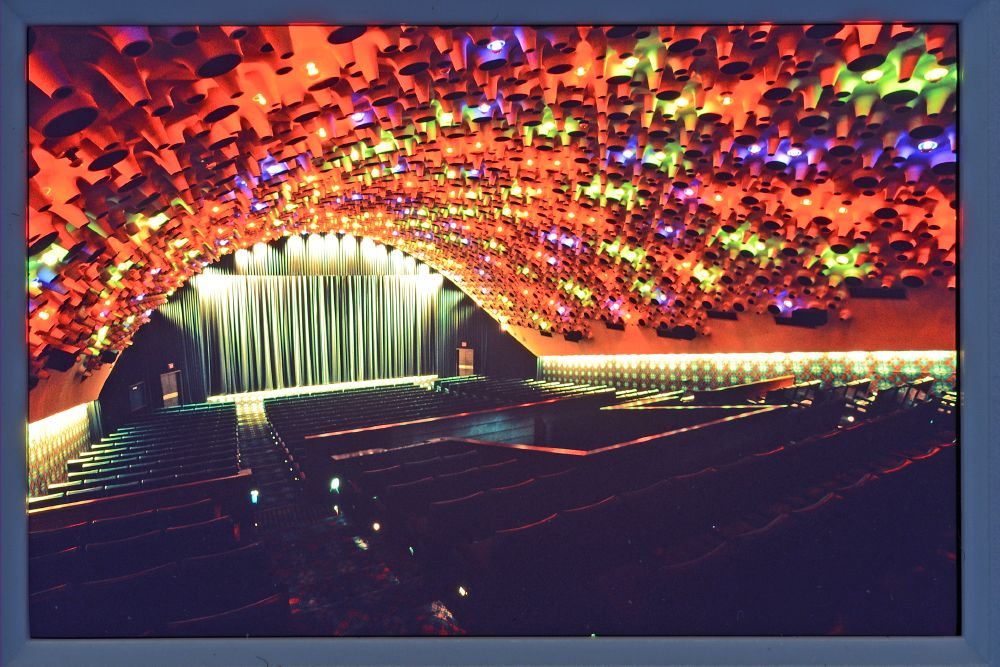
Blue Room with moonscape ceiling, 1999

The Blue Room was the larger and more ornate of the two cinemas. The most obvious feature was the vaulted ceiling, a plaster moonscape with craters of varying depths which conceal red, blue and green lights. Larger, shallower craters are interspersed with the light craters creating a rich and complex surface. There are 294 light globes on three circuits. A variety of lighting effects could be achieved using these different circuits and the coloured globes. A pelmet which concealed recessed lighting covered the intersection between ceiling and wall and turquoise woollen drapes fell to meet the carpet which came about one metre up the wall. The original carpet with an op-art, circular dot pattern of blue and brown was used throughout the cinema. The curve of the vault frames the screen which has several layers of turquoise wool drapes forming the curtain and surrounds. Architectural drawings from the 1970s refurbishment reveal that the plaster ceilings are attached to the bottom chord of the earlier curved timber truss.

The auditorium had two distinct levels of seating, the floor of the front section gently sloped towards the screen whilst the floor of the back section was steeply raked. The seating throughout the cinema was upholstered in blue vinyl and seating in the back section had circular drink holders integrated into the armrests. Timber screens of horizontal panelling divided areas of seating and a solid balustrade of similar detailing ran along the edge of the void at the top of the entry stairs. A small niche containing a seat for the usher was located within this, a reminder of that period when cinemas employed ushers to show people to their seats and keep an eye on them throughout the show. An intercom in this niche is still used to enable communication between staff members.

=== Purple Room ===
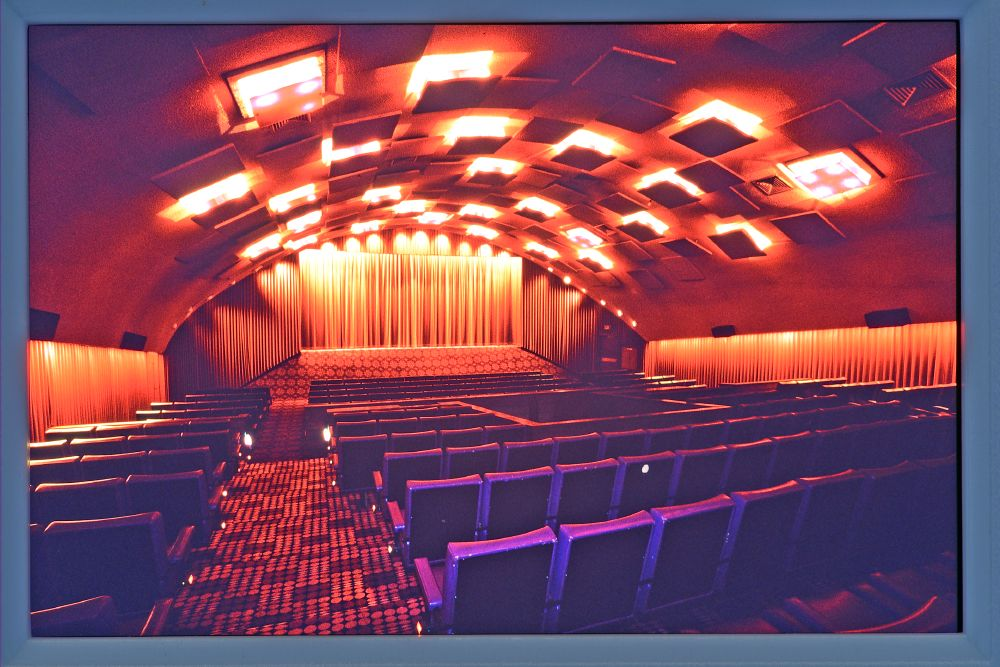
Purple Room, 1999

The Purple Room had a more gentle ambience; however, the ceiling was also a significant feature. The ceiling was vaulted with floating, sprayed vermiculite, square panels over concealed purple lighting, translucent purple resin light boxes and square air conditioning vents arranged in an irregular pattern. Carpet of the same design as the Blue Room but in shades of purple and mauve was used in the front half of the auditorium; however later the foyer carpet was used in the stairs and passageways. A purple version of the foyer carpet was in the back section. The Purple Room had the same seating configuration as the Blue Room but with a smaller number of seats. Seats were upholstered in purple vinyl and the walls are covered with purple wool drapes. Timber detailing was the same as Cinema One and also included an usher's seat. Wall lighting was concealed under pelmets at the top of the walls. A fire escape stair was located to the right of the screen.

The shared projection room was located at the back of each auditoria and was accessible from both cinemas.

== Description of New Farm Cinemas (2014–) ==
The refurbished Purple Room of the Village Twin Cinema is the flagship cinema of the New Farm Cinema complex but with contemporary seating which only accommodates 224 people compared to the Village Twin's capacity of 352. The Purple Room reopened on 1 August 2014. The new Bronze Room was created on the site of the Village Twin's candybar, accommodating 79 people. The Bronze Room opened on 1 August 2014.

An entirely new Blue Room for 96 people was opened in December 2014, along with three other cinemas: the Red Room (124 people) and two Gold Class cinemas (45 and 40 people).

== Heritage listing ==
The Village Twin Cinemas were listed on the Queensland Heritage Register on 24 March 2000 having satisfied the following criteria.

Importance in demonstrating the evolution or pattern of Queensland's history: The complex is significant for its continuous use as a cinema and its association with moving picture exhibition in New Farm since the early 1920s. The cinema is significant as the first twin cinema complex in Queensland (1970), and one of the earliest multi-screen cinemas in Australia.

Rare, uncommon or endangered aspects of Queensland's cultural heritage: It is a rare surviving and highly intact example of its type.

Importance in demonstrating the principal characteristics of a particular class of cultural places: The complex is important in demonstrating the principal characteristics of cinema decor, in particular, the distinctiveness of late 1960s/early 1970s design.

Importance because of its aesthetic significance: The interior in particular has strong aesthetic value. The highly decorative moulded ceilings of the cinema auditoria, the timber panelling, brick facing, carpeting and fittings in the foyers and the original and surviving internal colour schemes all contribute to the aesthetic and architectural significance of the building. The design exemplifies the sense of escapism and fantasy which is central to the tradition of cinema and theatre design.

Strong or special association with a particular community or cultural group for social, cultural or spiritual reasons: The cinema is credited as a New Farm landmark due to its location on Brunswick Street, where a theatre on this site has been the focus of social activity and popular culture in the suburb since the 1920s. It is one of the earliest examples of alternative or art house cinemas in Brisbane. As such, the Village Twin is important in demonstrating the evolution and specialisation of cinema audiences.
