= New Farm Park ferry wharf =

Ferry wharf in Queensland, Australia

New Farm Park
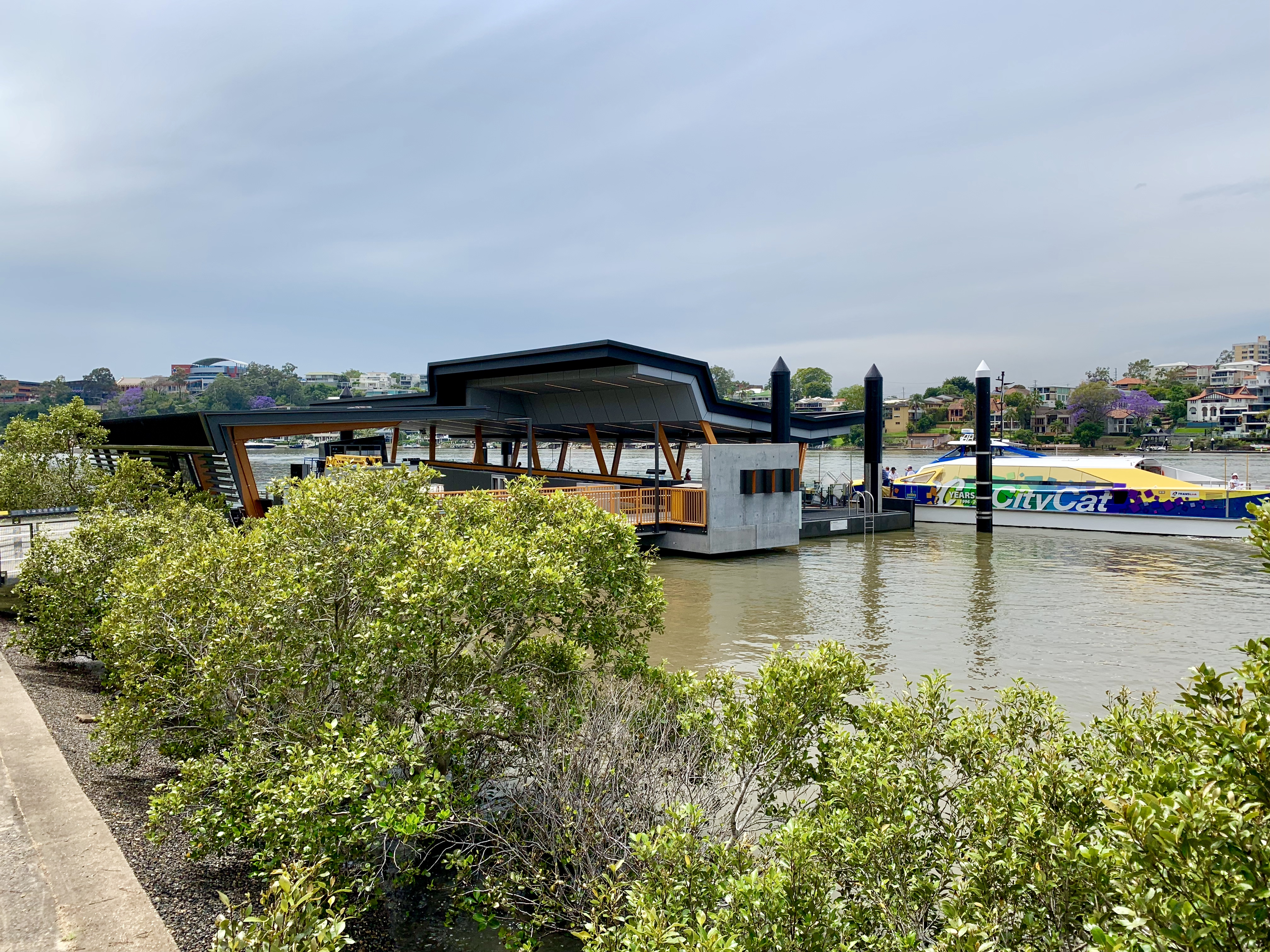

General information
- Location: Brunswick Street, New Farm; Australia
- Coordinates: 27°28′17″S 153°03′09″E
- Owner: Brisbane City Council
- Operator: RiverCity Ferries
- Platforms: 1

Construction
- Accessible: Yes

Other information
- Station code: 317588
- Fare zone: go card 1

Services
Preceding wharf	RiverCity Ferries	Following wharf
Mowbray Park towards UQ St Lucia	CityCat	Hawthorne towards Northshore Hamilton
Former service
Terminus	Cross River Ferries–Norman Park	Norman Park Terminus
Location

New Farm Park ferry wharf is located on the northern side of the Brisbane River serving the Brisbane suburb of New Farm in Queensland, Australia. It is served by RiverCity Ferries and was also served by a Cross River service to Norman Park. The latter service was suspended in July 2020 and formally cancelled in October 2020.

== Geography ==
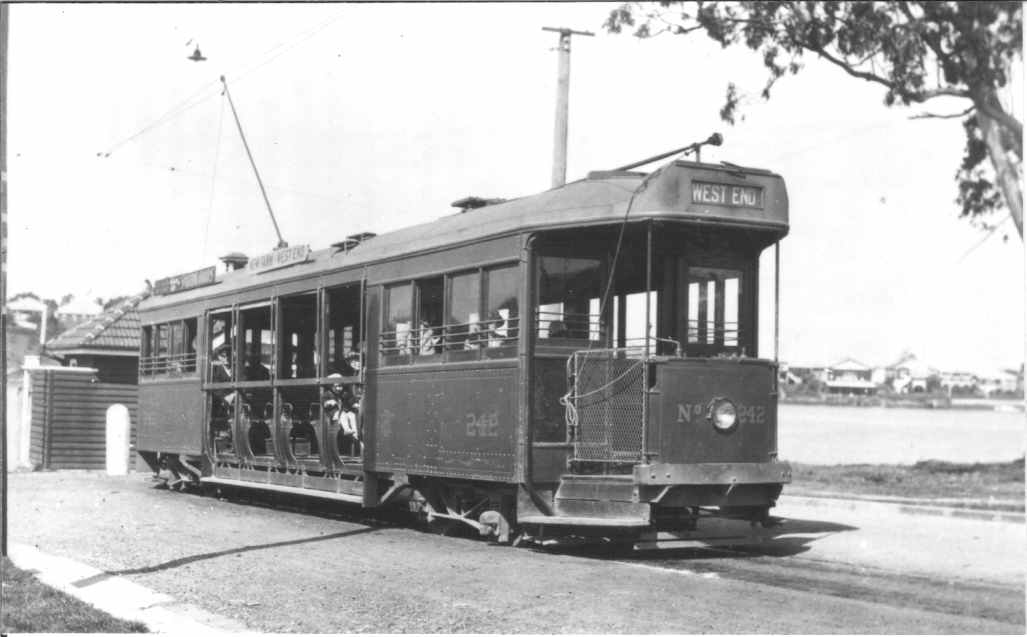
Brisbane Dropcentre Tram No.242 at the New Farm Ferry terminus, 1925

The ferry wharf is located at the end of Brunswick Street. One of the Brisbane tramway routes ran down to the river along Brunswick Street, providing connectivity with the ferry. Today, bus services operate this route. The ferry wharf also provides access to New Farm Park and the Brisbane Powerhouse arts and entertainment centre.

== History ==
The wharf was originally known as Brunswick Street wharf as it predated the existence of New Farm Park, having been in use at least as early as 1892. During World War II it was part of Naval Base Brisbane.

The wharf sustained moderate damage during the January 2011 Brisbane floods. It reopened after repairs on 14 February 2011.
