= Glenfalloch Apartments =

Heritage-listed high rise building in Brisbane

Coordinates: 27.4742°S 153.0430°E

Glenfalloch Apartments (1962) is a heritage-listed multi-storey residential building at 172 Oxlade Drive, New Farm Brisbane, Queensland. It is Brisbane’s second residential high rise and designed in the Modernist style. It is the first completely prefabricated concrete residential high-rise in the Southern Hemisphere.

== History ==
Glenfalloch Apartments is a residential building designed by Lund, Hutton, Newell, Black and Paulsen and completed in 1962 at a cost of £750,000.. It was developed by Stanley Korman and built by J.D Booker Constructions, who also developed Kinkabool in Surfers Paradise. It overlooks the Brisbane River. The site was previously the home of the Merthyr Bowls Club and Limbless Soldiers Bowl Club until it was sold. It was the first high rise in New Farm and Queensland’s second residential high-rise. It is the first completely prefabricated concrete residential high rise built in the Southern Hemisphere. It is listed on the Brisbane City Council Heritage Register.

Glenfalloch is 15 storeys tall, accessible via a lift and stairwells that protrude from its rectangular structure. It features two under building garages. It consists of 98 apartments, primarily two bedroom units, with penthouses on the top and one bedroom units on each side of its structure. To safeguard the building from flood, each of its two driveways leading to the garages have two metre high side walls. The apartments face north to take advantage of solar benefits, rather than river views.

All Directors of the Architectural Practice worked on the design; however, Peter Newell’s climate responsive expertise contributed greatly to the livability. The original plans of the building evidence extensive consideration given to solar shading in regards to the siting of the building on the block as well as the glazing. The building was designed to be long and thin without windows to the East or West, in order to deflect direct sunlight. The most important rooms in the majority of units face North (they overlook New Farm instead of the Brisbane River). The long thin design and siting of the building on the block is notable because it facilitates the most important rooms in the majority of units to be flooded in natural light and obtain airflow. The sought after one bedroom unit types A and G, as well as Penthouses A and B, face the Brisbane River as well as New Farm. Because of its design the building is passively cool in summer and passively warm in winter. Albeit, the siting is not at its most optimal in this regard, most likely because the length of the building was required to align with Oxlade Drive instead of face perfect North.

It is likely Theodore Hutton was most influential in choosing the interior fixtures and fittings.

It is unique in that 60% of the land on which it sits is dedicated garden and outdoor living space leading to the river.

Modern improvements to the façade include new glazed aluminium, new windows, doors and balustrades. During the 1974 and 2011 floods which affected Brisbane, owners of the home units utilised a flood deflection barrier system devised and made onsite prior to 1974, as well as sandbagged the garage and driveway areas preventing the flooding of lower level apartments.

The garden was designed by renowned Landscape Architect, Arne Fink, an early adopter of using native plants in residential landscapes. The garden cost approximately £1500.

Plans of the designs for Glenfalloch are held in the University of Queensland Fryer Library.
