= Norman Park ferry wharf =

Closed ferry wharf in Brisbane

Norman Park
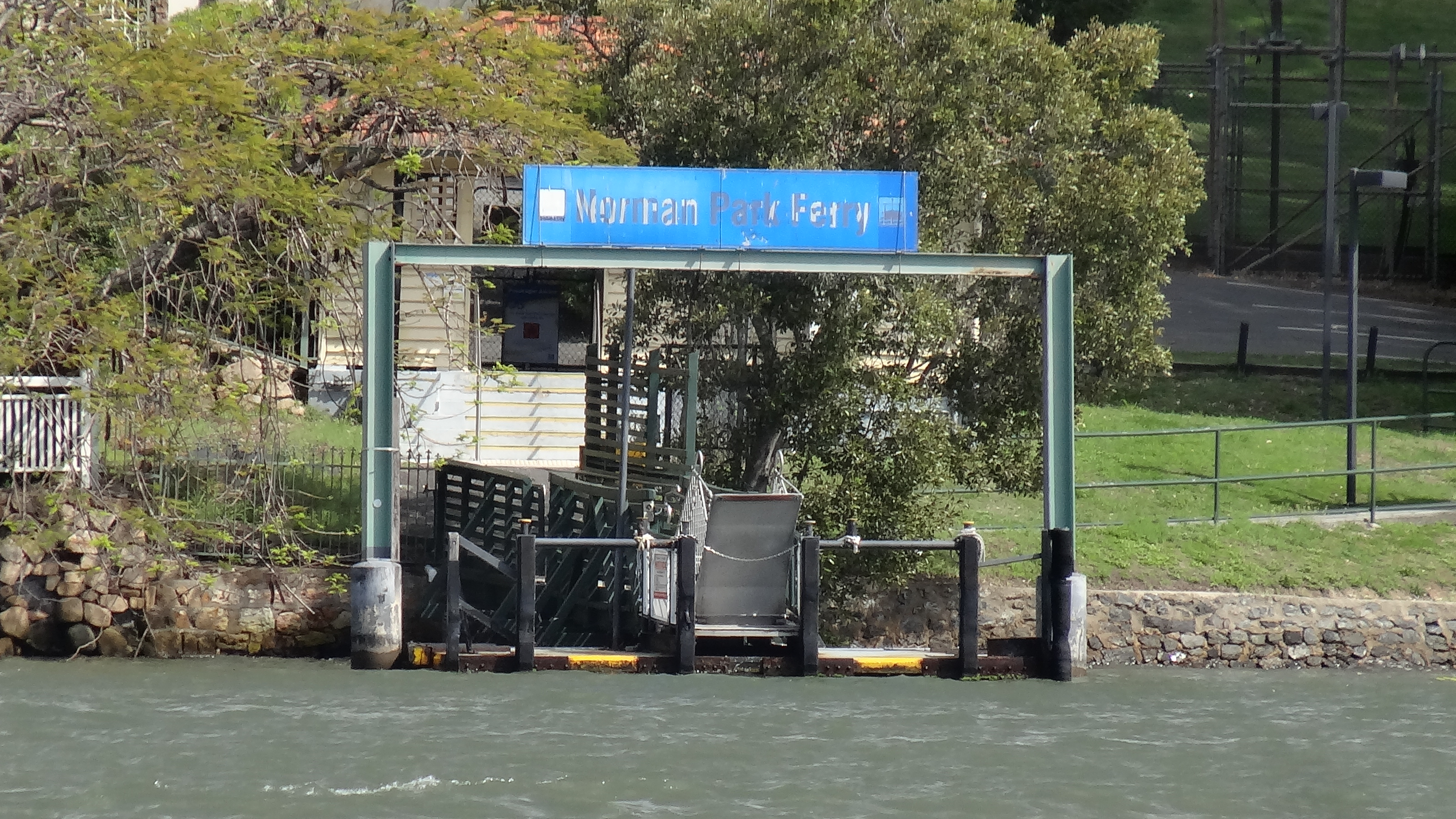
- View from New Farm Park ferry wharf

General information
- Location: Wynnum Road, Norman Park; Australia
- Coordinates: 27°28′27″S 153°03′13″E
- Owner: Brisbane City Council
- Operator: Transdev Brisbane Ferries
- Platforms: 1

Construction
- Accessible: Yes

Other information
- Status: closed
- Station code: 317585
- Fare zone: go card 1

Services
| Preceding wharf | RiverCity Ferries | Following wharf |
Former service
| New Farm Park Terminus | Cross River Ferries–Norman Park | Terminus |
Location

Norman Park ferry wharf was a ferry terminal located on the southern side of the Brisbane River serving the Brisbane suburb of Norman Park in Queensland, Australia. It was served by Transdev Brisbane Ferries' cross-river service to New Farm Park. These services were suspended in July 2020 and the wharf was permanently closed in October 2020.

== History ==
Due to poor patronage caused by bad connections with the CityCat at New Farm Park, the cross river service was withdrawn and the wharf closed in 2000. The wharf reopened and the cross river service resumed on 15 January 2007, with a proper connection to the CityCat service.

The wharf sustained moderate damage during the January 2011 Brisbane floods. It reopened after repairs on 14 February 2011.

The cross river ferry service was suspended in July 2020 due to the hull condition of the cross-river ferry fleet. The service was permanently withdrawn in October 2020 and the wharf was closed.
