= Norman R. Wright & Sons =

Australian shipbuilding company

- Industry: Shipbuilding
- Founded: 1909
- Founder: Norman R. Wright
- Headquarters: Murarrie, Brisbane, Australia
- Products: Boats
- Owner: Bill & Ian Wright
- Website: www.wrightsons.com.au

Norman R. Wright & Sons is an Australian shipbuilding company.

== History ==
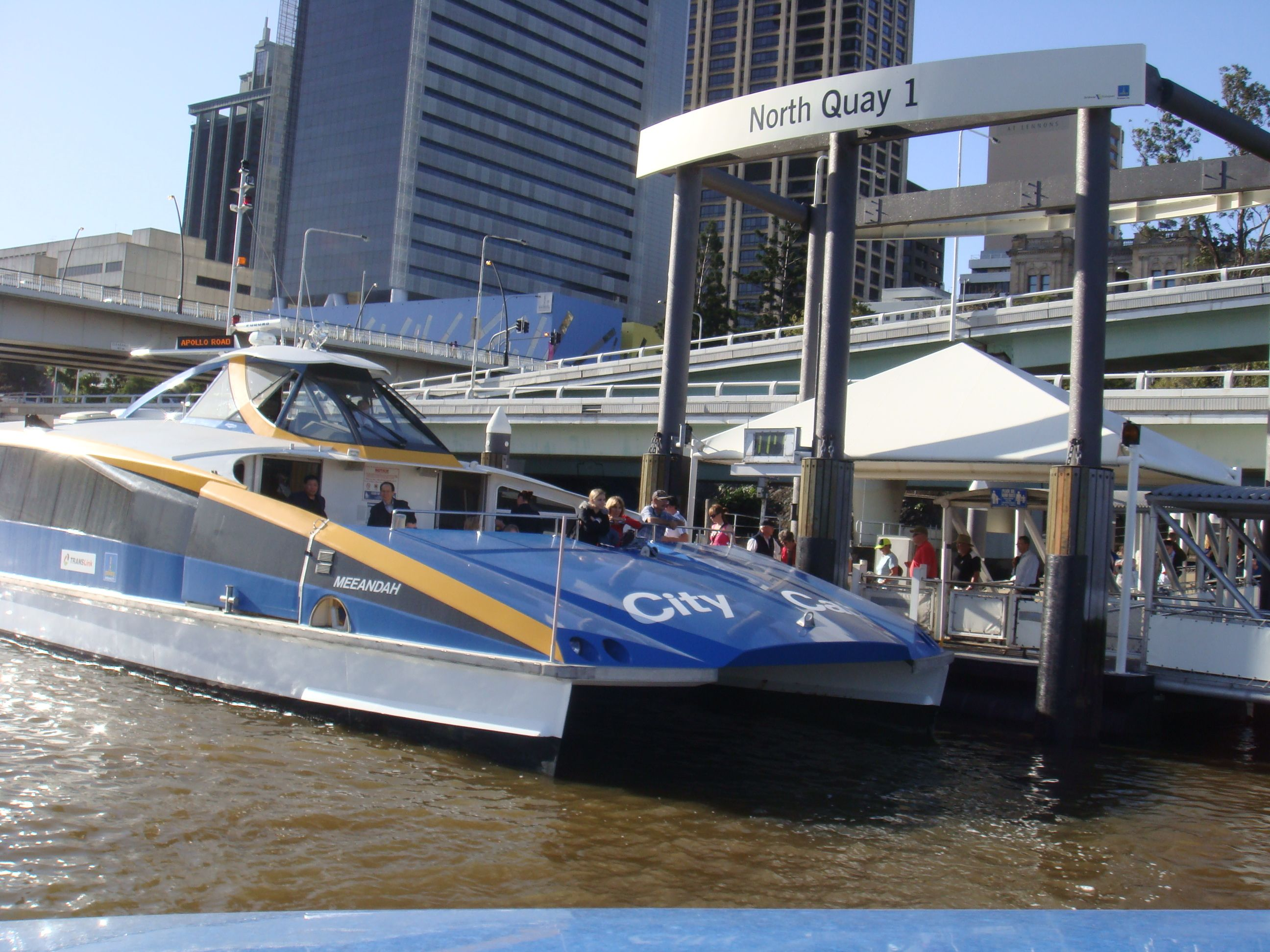
Transdev Brisbane Ferries' Meeandah at North Quay ferry wharf

In 1909 Norman Wright opened a shipbuilding business in Newstead. The first vessel completed was the Superb, a shallow draught gaff-rigged centreboard yacht. The yard mainly built pleasure craft, the largest being Francois, a 75-foot racing yacht.

In the 1930s, it moved to Bulimba. Following the outbreak of World War II in 1939, the building of recreational craft was suspended with the yard refitting various requisitioned vessels for war service. The Royal Australian Navy commissioned Norman Wright to build four Fairmile B motor launches.

After the war Norman Wright built commercial boats such as trawlers, luggers, and vessels for the tourist resorts. During this period, the yard built boats for the Barrier Reef islands of Lindeman, South Molle, Orpheus, Magnetic and Hayman. By the 1950s, Norman Wright's sons had assumed responsibility for the day-to-day operation.

Its most prominent builds in recent years have been catamaran ferries. In the 1990s, it built three for Matilda Cruises, Sydney, the Alice, Jillian and Megan and two for the State Transit Authority, the Anne Seargent and Pam Burridge. Since 2004, it has built 13 ferries for Transdev Brisbane Ferries.
