= South Bank 3 ferry wharf =

Former ferry wharf in Brisbane, Australia

South Bank 3
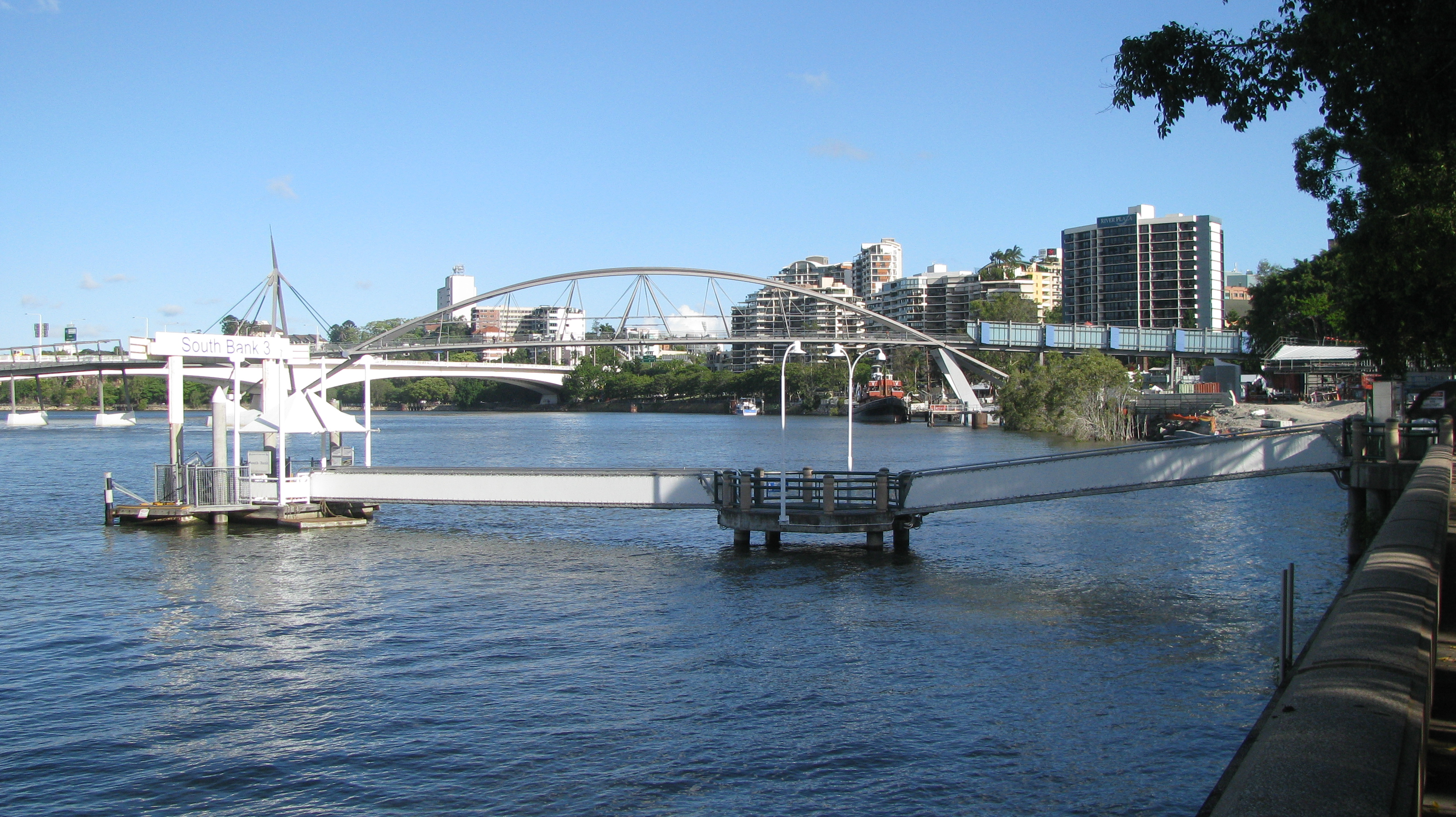

General information
- Location: Little Stanley Street, South Brisbane
- Coordinates: 27°28′47″S 153°01′30″E
- Owner: Brisbane City Council
- Operator: RiverCity Ferries
- Platforms: 1

Construction
- Accessible: Yes

Services
Preceding wharf	RiverCity Ferries	Following wharf
North Quay Terminus	CityHopper	Maritime Museum towards Sydney Street
Location

South Bank 3 ferry wharf is a former ferry wharf located on the southern side of the Brisbane River which serviced the Brisbane suburb of South Brisbane in Queensland, Australia. It was used by RiverCity Ferries' CityHopper service. All services have moved to the South Bank ferry terminal which is located 500 metres upstream.

== History ==
The wharf sustained moderate damage during the January 2011 Brisbane floods. It reopened after repairs on 14 February 2011.
