= Eagle Street Pier ferry wharf =

Ferry wharf in Brisbane

Eagle Street Pier
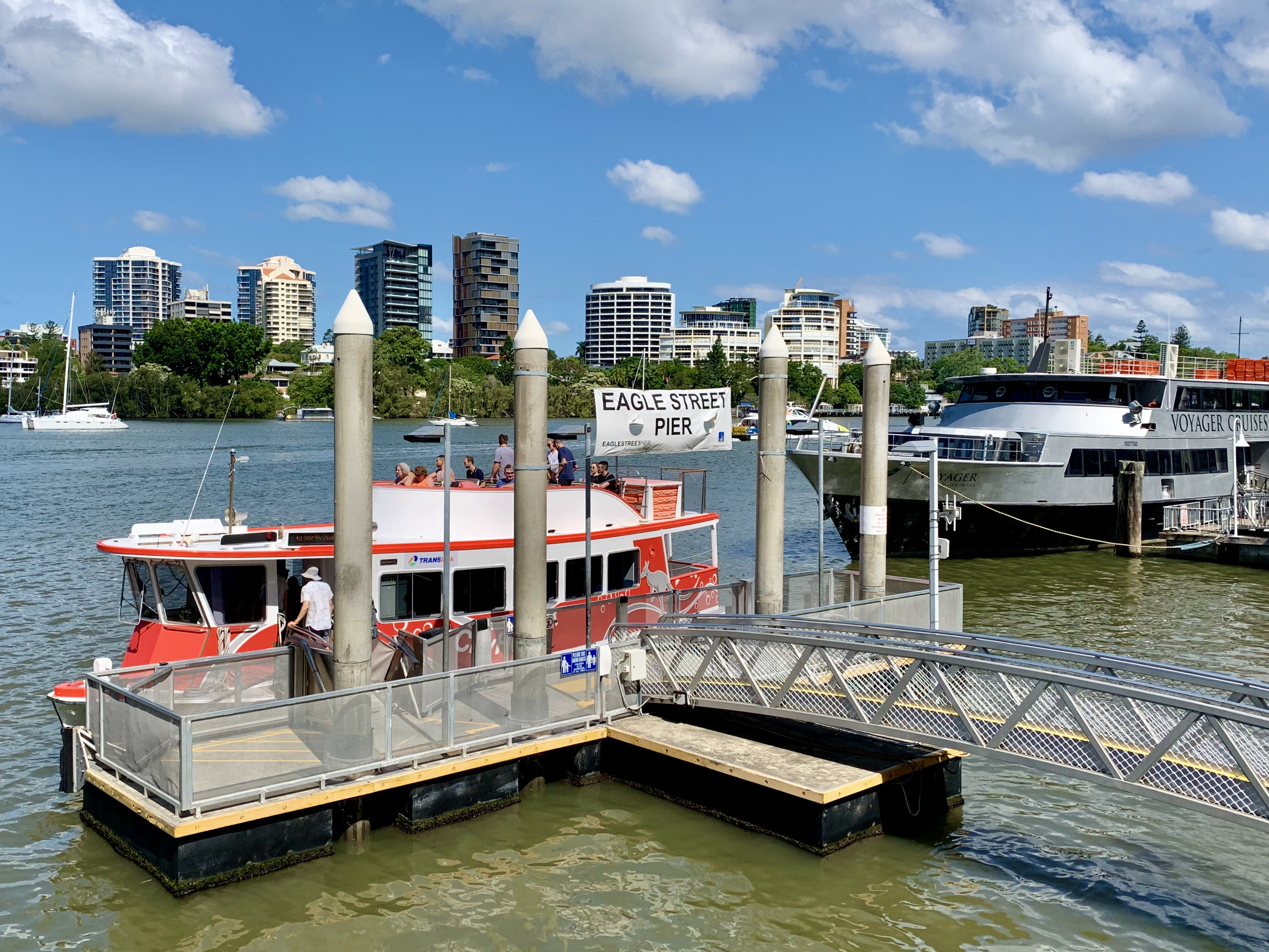

General information
- Location: Eagle Street, Brisbane CBD; Australia
- Coordinates: 27°28′08″S 153°01′51″E
- Owner: Brisbane City Council
- Operator: Transdev Brisbane Ferries
- Platforms: 1

Construction
- Accessible: Yes

Other information
- Station code: 317591
- Fare zone: go card 1

Services
Preceding wharf	RiverCity Ferries	Following wharf
Former services
Thornton Street towards North Quay	CityHopper	Holman Street towards Sydney Street
Thornton Street towards Howard Smith Wharves	Cross River Ferries–Kangaroo Point	Holman Street Terminus
Location

Eagle Street Pier ferry wharf was located on the northern side of the Brisbane River serving the Brisbane central business district in Queensland, Australia. It was served by Transdev Brisbane Ferries' CityHopper service and a cross-river service to Kangaroo Point (to the Holman Street and Thornton Street ferry terminals). These services were suspended in July 2020 and formally cancelled to stop at this wharf in October 2020.

== History ==
The area was operated by the Australasian United Steam Navigation Company from the 1800s to the 1960s. The maritime industry then fell into decline and the structures were converted into car parking. The public ferry service at Eagle Street Pier commenced in 1989.

The wharf sustained moderate damage during the January 2011 Brisbane floods. It reopened after repairs on 14 February 2011.

The ferry wharf attached to the Eagle Street Pier waterfront complex, built in 1988. The popular site housed a range of retail commercial, and hospitality venues. It was demolished in 2023 and a new development is planned called Waterfront Brisbane.
