= South Bank ferry wharf =

CityCat wharves in Brisbane, Australia

South Bank
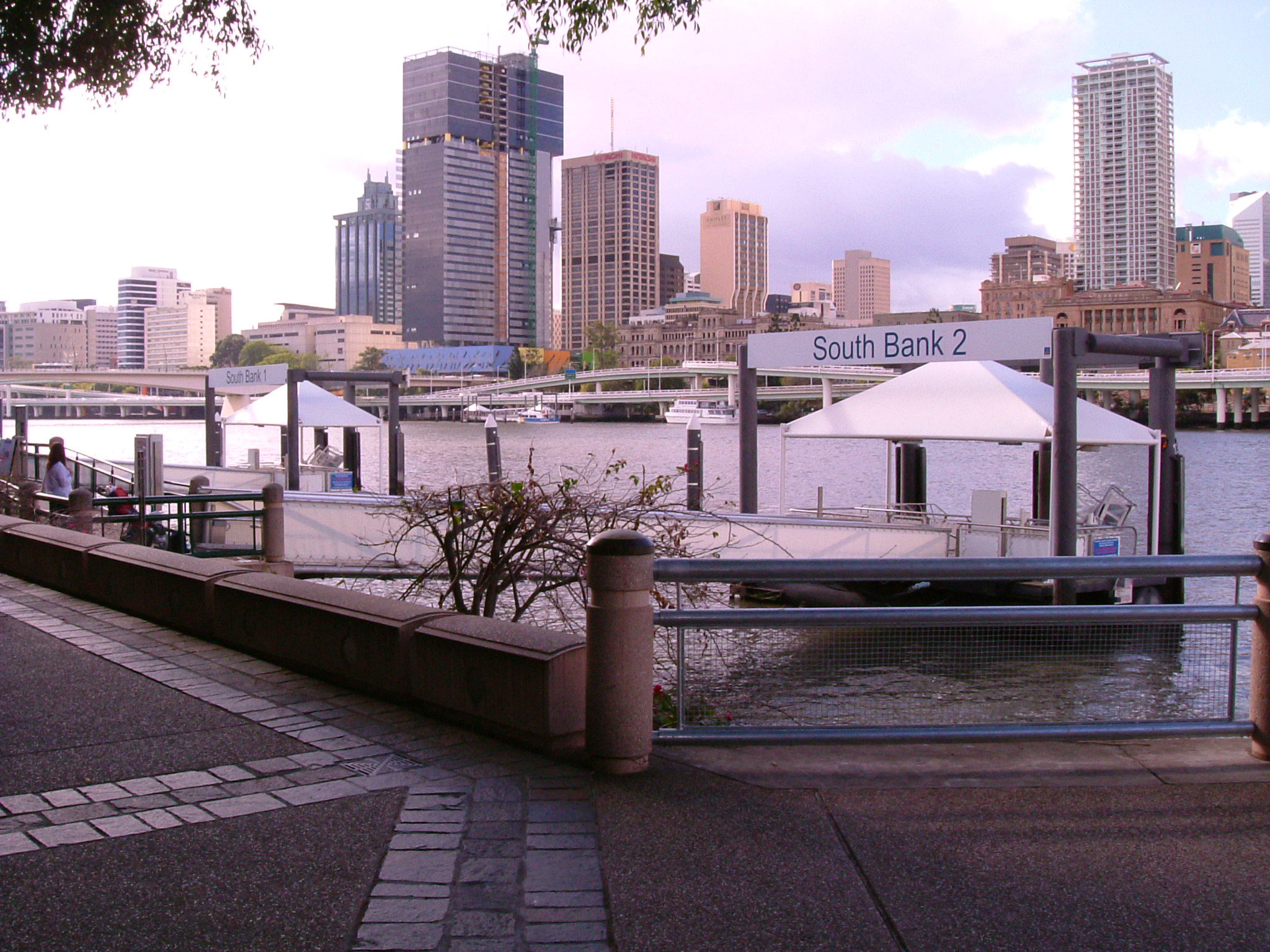

General information
- Location: Little Stanley Street, South Brisbane; Australia
- Coordinates: 27°28′34″S 153°01′20″E
- Owner: Brisbane City Council
- Operator: RiverCity Ferries
- Platforms: 1

Construction
- Accessible: Yes

Other information
- Station code: 321666
- Fare zone: go card 1

Services
Preceding wharf	RiverCity Ferries	Following wharf
North Quay towards UQ St Lucia	CityCat	QUT Gardens Point towards Northshore Hamilton
North Quay Terminus	CityHopper	Maritime Museum towards Sydney Street
Location

South Bank ferry wharf is located on the southern side of the Brisbane River serving the Brisbane suburb of South Brisbane in Queensland, Australia. The wharf is used by RiverCity Ferries CityCat and CityHopper services.

The wharf sustained moderate damage during the January 2011 Brisbane floods. It reopened after repairs on 14 February 2011.

== Location ==
The wharf is located in the South Bank Parklands near the Queensland Cultural Centre. They provide the closest transport access point to the Streets Beach and the Wheel of Brisbane. It is also close to the Queensland Performing Arts Centre and the Griffith University conservatorium. The western end of the Victoria Bridge is close to the wharves. The former South Bank wharf 3 is located 500 metres downstream.

== Description ==
The wharf consists of one pier with the ability to dock 3–4 vessels at once. There is a covered passenger waiting area build into the wharf.
