= New Farm, Queensland =

New Farm
- Suburb
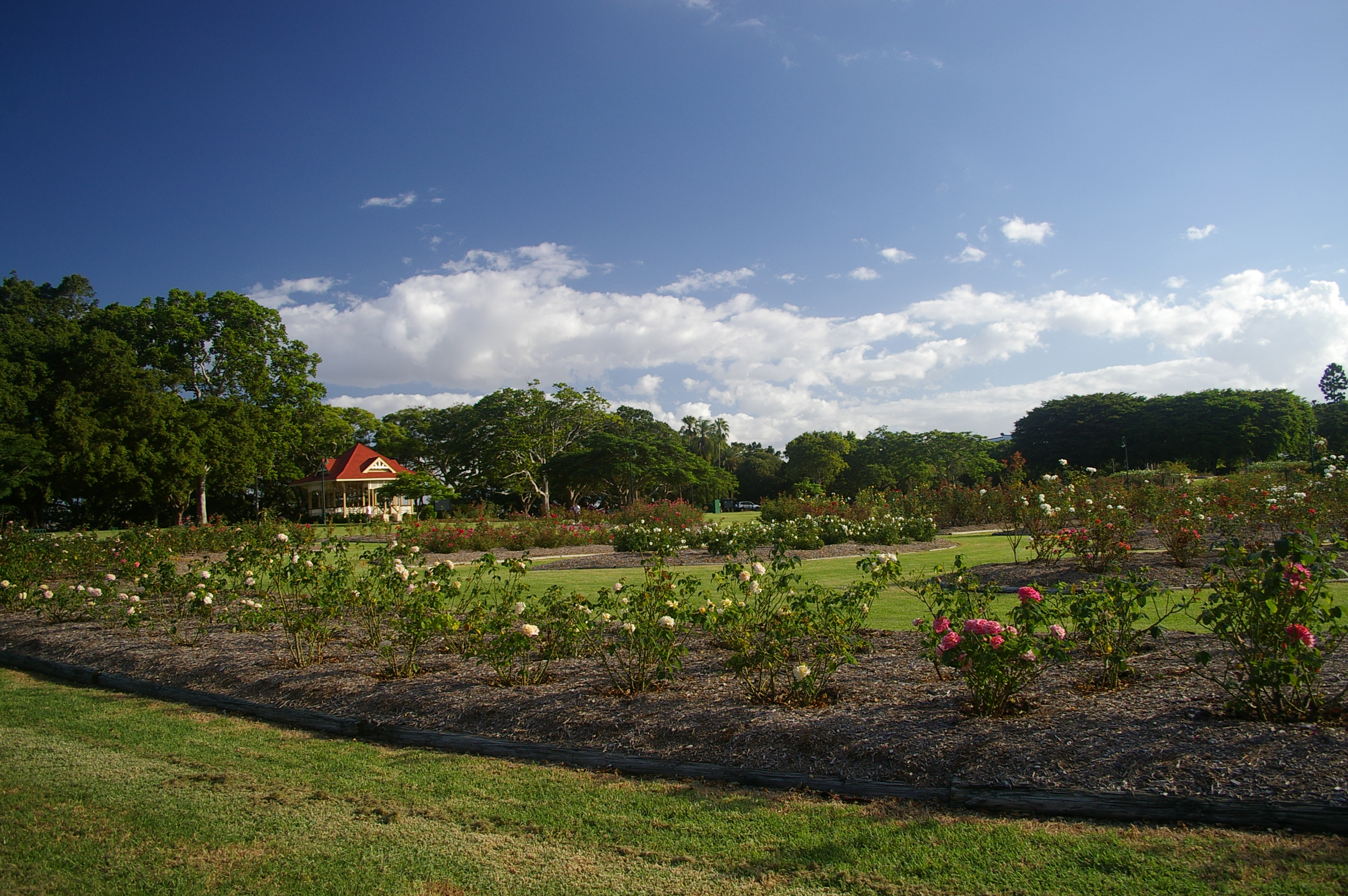
- New Farm Park

- Interactive map of New Farm
- Coordinates: 27.4677°S 153.0483°E
- Country: Australia
- State: Queensland
- City: Brisbane
- LGA: City of Brisbane (Central Ward)
- Location: 2.8 km (1.7 mi) E of Brisbane CBD

Government
  - State electorate: McConnel
  - Federal division: Brisbane

Area
  - Total: 2.5 km^{2} (0.97 sq mi)

Population
  - Total: 12,197 (2021 census)
  - Density: 4,880/km^{2} (12,640/sq mi)
- Time zone: UTC+10:00 (AEST)
- Postcode: 4005
Suburbs around New Farm
Fortitude Valley	Teneriffe	Teneriffe
Kangaroo Point	New Farm	Hawthorne
Kangaroo Point	East Brisbane	Norman Park

New Farm is an inner northern riverside suburb in the City of Brisbane, Queensland, Australia. In the 2021 census, New Farm had a population of 12,197 people.

== Geography ==
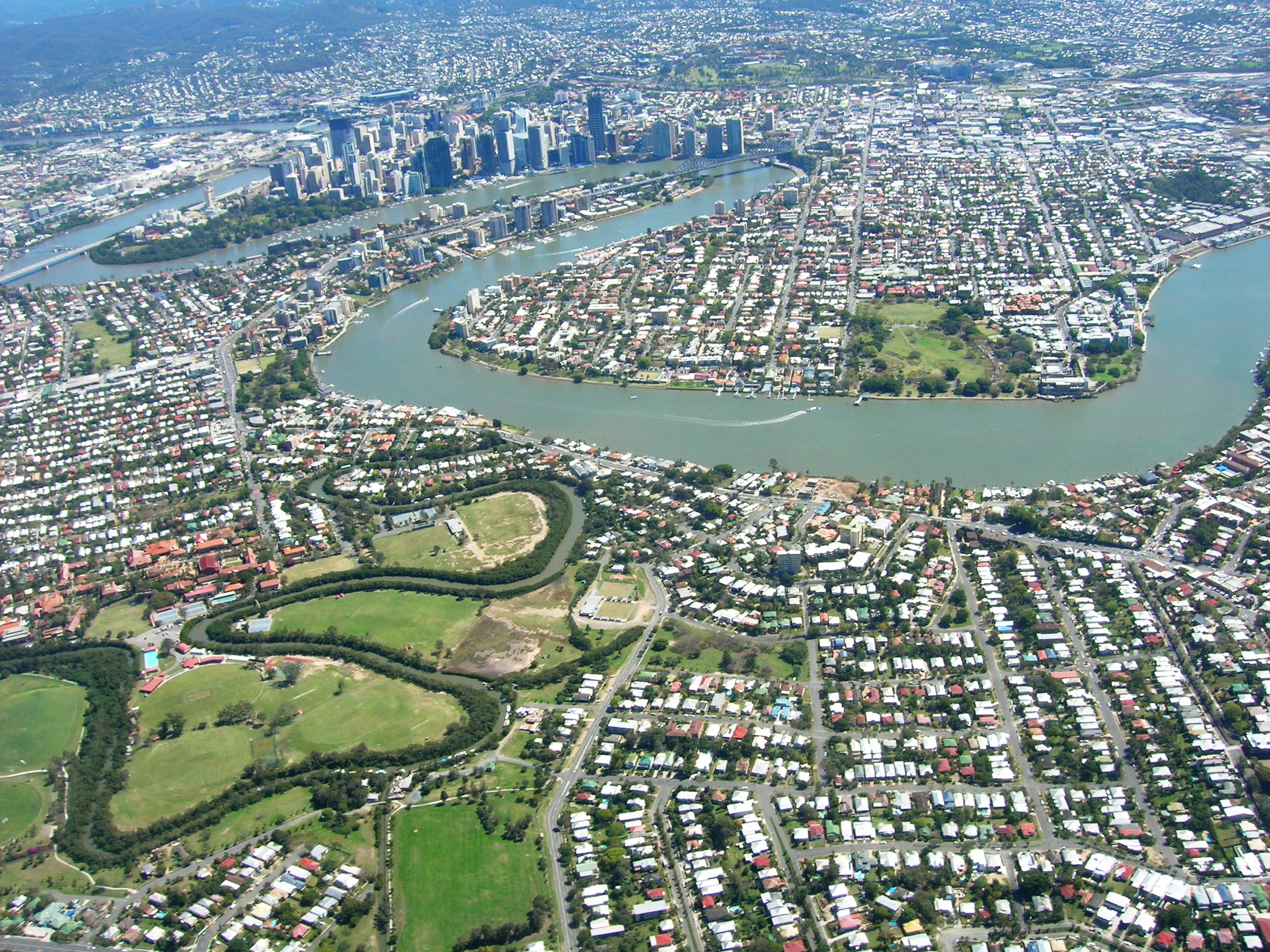
The suburb of New Farm (peninsula in upper part of image) including New Farm Park is located on the Brisbane River.

The suburb is located 2 kilometres east of the Brisbane CBD on a large bend of the Brisbane River. New Farm is partly surrounded by the Brisbane River, with land access from the north-west through Fortitude Valley and from the north through Newstead. Merthyr is a neighbourhood within New Farm; until 1975 it was a separate suburb.

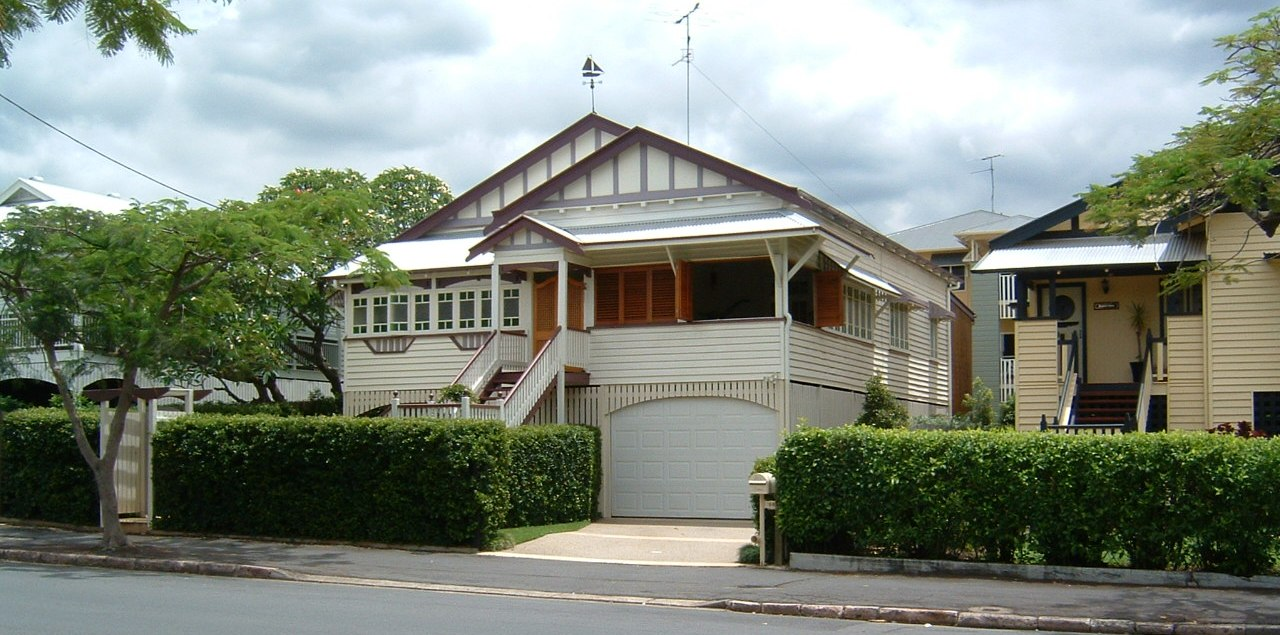
An interwar Queenslander in New Farm

The suburb contains a mix of 19th-century colonial constructions; 20th-century traditional Queenslander and Federation homes, and more recent architectural developments. New Farm also has a number of art deco buildings. As population density has increased, apartment, unit and duplex housing have come to account for more than 70% of local dwellings. Detached housing remains part of the local housing market, with demand and prices reported to have increased.

At the south-eastern end of the peninsula is the historic New Farm Park. Brunswick Street is the main street running northwest–southeast up the centre of the peninsula. To the south of Brunswick Street the suburb is characterised by large ornate Queenslander-style houses, shady streets lined with large trees and tall apartment buildings, predominantly along the river. More modest Queenslander-style houses dominate the north of Brunswick Street, where there are fewer large trees and apartments.

The suburb has one main commercial area close to New Farm Park, called 'Merthyr Village'. A wide variety of businesses also operate along Brunswick Street and in adjacent streets. The former electric tramway power station, located at the eastern corner of New Farm Park, has been converted into a community arts and performance space called 'The Powerhouse'. New Farm is known as Brisbane's "Little Italy" as many immigrants from Italian descent first settled in the suburb. The Brisbane City Council operates a public library at 135 Sydney Street. The library opened in 1975 and offers publicly accessible Wi-Fi.

== History ==
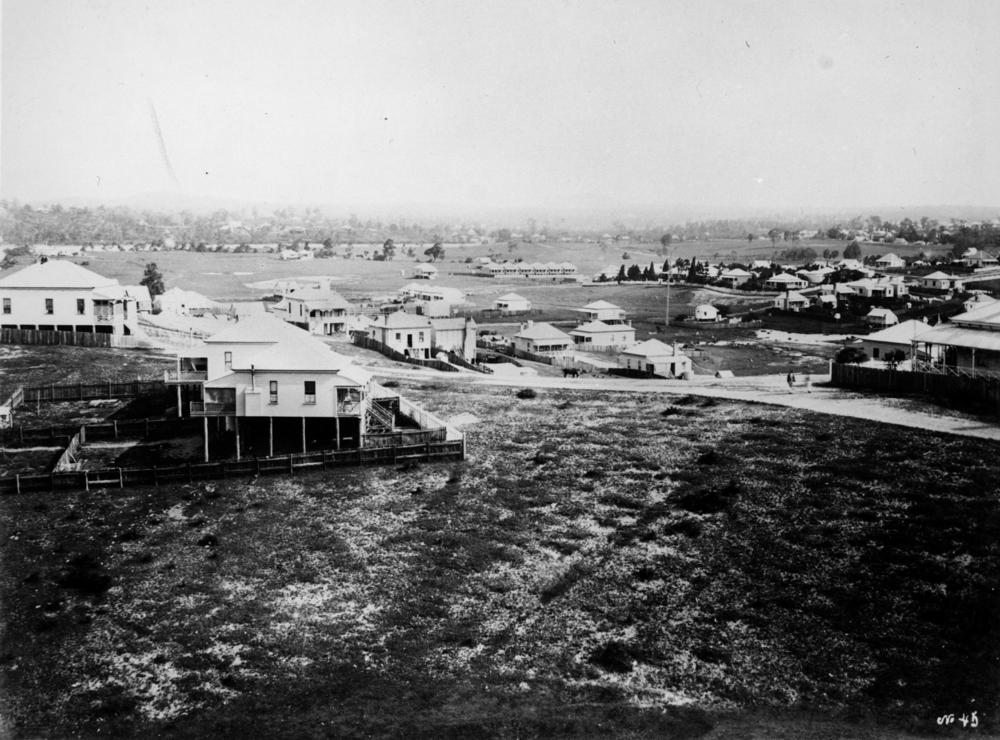
View of New Farm c.1885

Though one of Brisbane's oldest suburbs, the peninsula of New Farm was once called Binkinba (place of the land tortoises) by the indigenous Turrbal tribe of Brisbane.

The suburb derives its name from the fact that the peninsula was used as a farming area in the early years of Brisbane's history. Commandant Patrick Logan established a new farm in the area in 1827 as part of the Moreton Bay penal colony. The area was also a working site of convicts (lime kilns dating back to 1870 are still evident on the river banks).

Politician and judge Samuel Griffith built his house 'Merthyr' in the suburb in 1870.

From 1885 to 1897, New Farm's transport needs were met by horse-drawn trams, which operated along Brunswick Street, as far as Barker Street. In 1897, the horse trams were replaced with electric trams and the line was extended, with trams ultimately running as far as Macquarie Street and down to the river at New Farm Park. The electric trams ceased operation on 13 April 1969. Since then the suburb has been served by diesel buses.

New Farm State School was opened on 21 January 1901.

On 29 November 1919, 24 river frontage subdivided allotments between Merthyr Road and Sydney Street were advertised to be auctioned by Cameron Bros Auctioneers. A map advertising the auction indicated that the home of Sir Samuel Griffith was adjacent to the advertised lots.

On 24 April 1920, 5 allotments on Welsby Street were advertised to be auctioned on 27 April 1920 at 11am by Cameron Bros Auctioneers. A map advertising the auction indicated that the lots were close to the new tramway.

On 6 May 1920, 5 residential sites and 2 cottages were advertised to be auctioned on Monday 10 May 1920 by Cameron Bros Auctioneers. A map advertising the auction indicated that the lots and cottages were located between St Clair House and Heal Street.

In 1923, the Catholic Church purchased a house to celebrate mass. The Holy Spirit Church opened on 1 June 1930, enabling the Sisters of Mercy to open the Holy Spirit School on 7 July 1930 in the house. The house was replaced with a purpose-built school building costing £4,000. In September 1937 the new school guilding was blessed and opened by Archbishop of Brisbane, James Duhig.

There was a marine base established in World War II and the suburb was home to many wealthy merchants and lawyers.

Spastic Centre School opened on 12 February 1951. It was renamed New Farm Special School in 1974. It closed on 16 December 1994.

New Farm developed a reputation in the late 1980s for street prostitution and as a drug-addled, low-rent culture depicted in Andrew McGahan's grunge novel Praise, which is set largely in the suburb.

Since then, and like many Brisbane suburbs, New Farm has experienced much 'gentrification' and 'infill development' throughout the 1990s and the years since 2000. However, New Farm maintains its diversity, being known for its long-established Anglo-Saxon and Italian communities (as depicted in Venero Armanno's novel Firehead), and its many restaurants and cafes.

On 23 January 2007, part of the movie Fool's Gold, starring Kate Hudson, was shot at New Farm Park. Scenes from the films All My Friends Are Leaving Brisbane (2007) and Jucy (2011) have also been shot there.

== Demographics ==
At the 2011 census, New Farm recorded a population of 11,330. This meant New Farm had the highest population density in Greater Brisbane at the time with approximately 5,861.7 people per square kilometre.

In the 2016 census, New Farm had a population of 12,542 people.

In the 2021 census, New Farm had a population of 12,197 people. With 5% of household couples identifying as same-sex, New Farm is home to one of Queensland's largest LGBT communities.

== Heritage listings ==
New Farm has a number of heritage-listed sites, including:

- 41 Abbott Street: Residence, Abbott Street
- 41 Balfour Street: Cairnsville
- 388 Bowen Terrace (27.4659°S 153.0430°E): Feniton
- 701 Brunswick Street: Village Twin Cinemas
- 790 Brunswick Street: Wynberg
- Cnr James & Heal Streets: New Farm State School
- 12 Julius Street: Langshaw Marble Lime Works
- 15 Julius Street: Julius Street Flats
- Lamington Street: former CSR Refinery
- 71–73 Moray Street: Bertholme
- 186 Moray Street: Glenugie
- 209 Moray Street: Santa Barbara
- 172 Oxlade Drive: Glenfalloch Apartments
- 1 Riverview Court: The Moorings
- 137 Sydney Street: New Farm Park
- 101 Welsby Street: Amity

== Education ==
New Farm State School is a government primary (Prep–6) school for boys and girls at corner of James & Heal Streets (27.4602°S 153.0451°E). In 2017, the school had an enrolment of 449 students with 32 teachers (27 full-time equivalent) and 19 non-teaching staff (12 full-time equivalent).

Holy Spirit School is a Catholic primary (Prep–6) school for boys and girls at 36 Villiers Street (27.4651°S 153.0458°E). In 2017, the school had an enrolment of 255 students with 21 teachers (17 full-time equivalent) and 10 non-teaching staff (5 full-time equivalent).

There are no secondary schools in New Farm; the nearest was Kelvin Grove State College until the start of 2020 when the new Fortitude Valley State Secondary College opened.

== Amenities ==
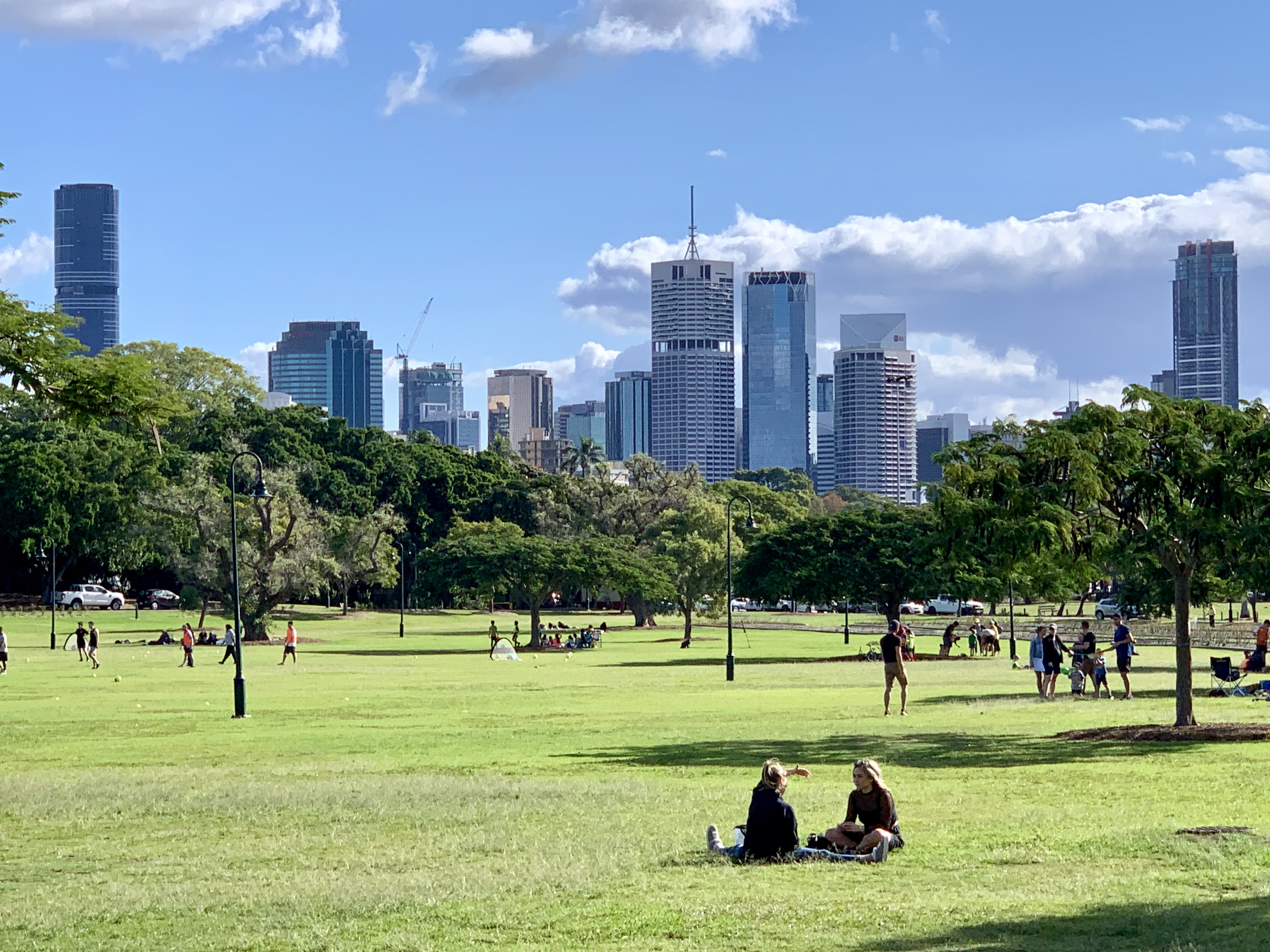
Brisbane CBD seen from New Farm Park

There are a number of parks in the area:

- Howard Smith Wharf Precinct (27.4629°S 153.0377°E)
- Merthyr Park (27.4744°S 153.0471°E)
- Merthyr Road Park (27.4645°S 153.0519°E)
- Merthyr Road Park (no.2) (27.4712°S 153.0413°E)
- New Farm Park (27.4692°S 153.0512°E)
- Powerhouse Park (27.4678°S 153.0542°E)
- Welsby Street Park (27.4647°S 153.0510°E)
- Wilson Outlook Reserve (27.4633°S 153.0388°E)

== Transport ==
By Ferry New Farm can be accessed via two CityCat stops – at Sydney Street and at New Farm Park. At the river end of Brunswick Street a small cross-river ferry, operated by Brisbane Transport used to link New Farm with Norman Park. However, the service was removed in July 2020, upsetting many Norman Park residents.

By Bus The suburb is serviced by several Transport for Brisbane bus routes. This includes BUZ services 196 and 199, running cross-town via the city centre, as well as the peak-only 195 to the city.

The Smart Cities: Rethinking the City Centre report proposes building green bridges from Merthyr Road across the Brisbane River to Bulimba in the east and to Kangaroo Point in the west.

== Notable residents ==
- Sir Samuel Griffith (judge & politician)
- Thomas Welsby (politician & businessman)
- Jim Soorley (politician)
- William Villiers Brown (politician)
- Thomas Wilson (politician)

== See also ==
- List of Brisbane suburbs
