= Maritime Museum ferry wharf =

Ferry wharf in Brisbane

Maritime Museum
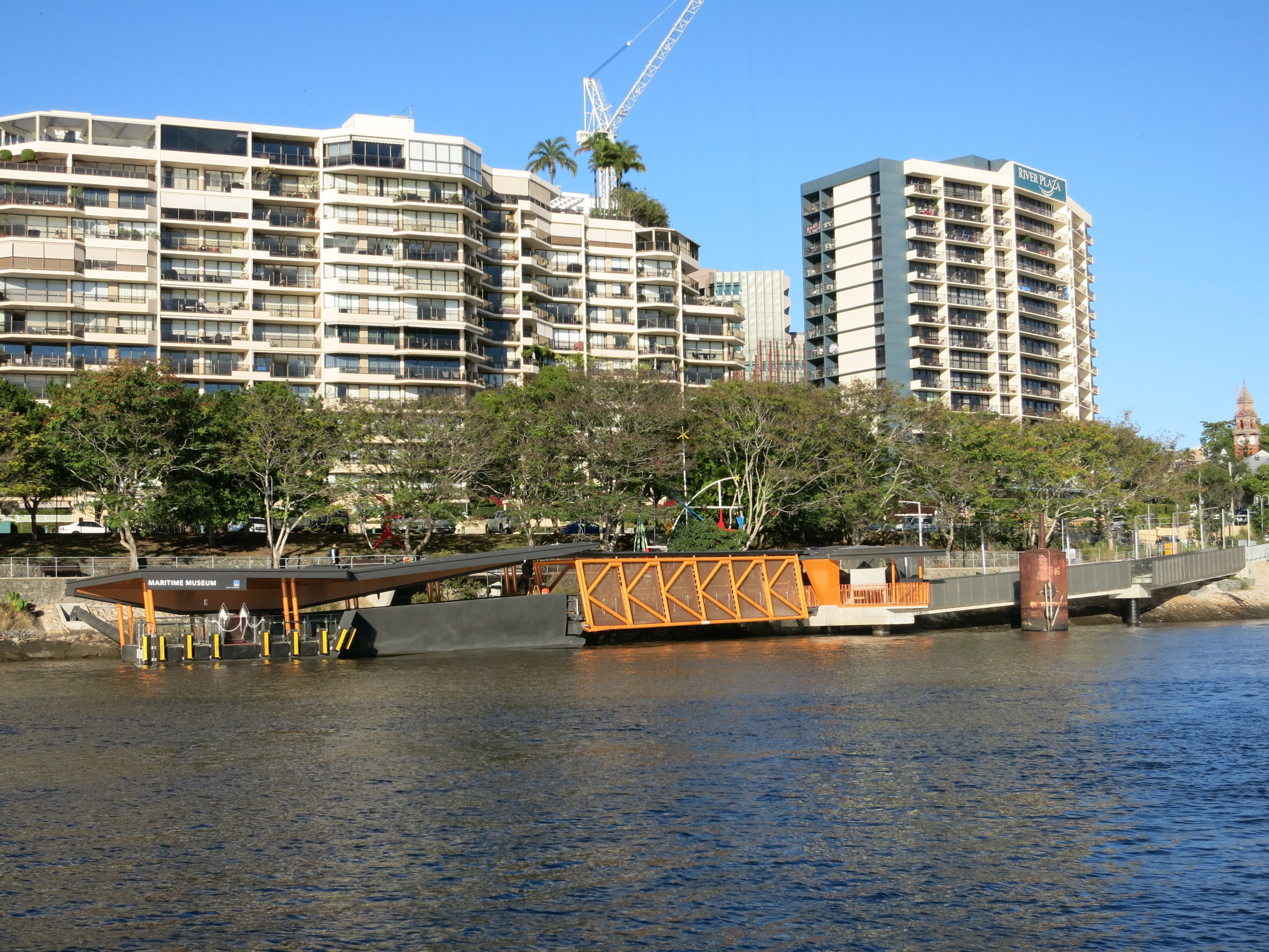

General information
- Location: Lower River Terrace, South Brisbane; Australia
- Coordinates: 27°28′55″S 153°01′42″E
- Owner: Brisbane City Council
- Operator: RiverCity Ferries
- Platforms: 1

Other information
- Station code: 317578
- Fare zone: go card 1

History
- Former names: River Plaza

Services
Preceding wharf	RiverCity Ferries	Following wharf
South Bank towards North Quay	CityHopper	Riverside towards Sydney Street
Location

Maritime Museum ferry wharf is located on the southern side of the Brisbane River serving the Brisbane suburb of South Brisbane in Queensland, Australia. It is served by RiverCity Ferries' CityHopper service. It was originally named River Plaza.

The wharf sustained major damage during the January 2011 Brisbane floods. A new wharf was built opening on 31 July 2011, with the Maritime Museum name adopted after the adjacent Queensland Maritime Museum.
