= Pinkenba Wharf =

Coordinates: 27.42802°S 153.12089°E

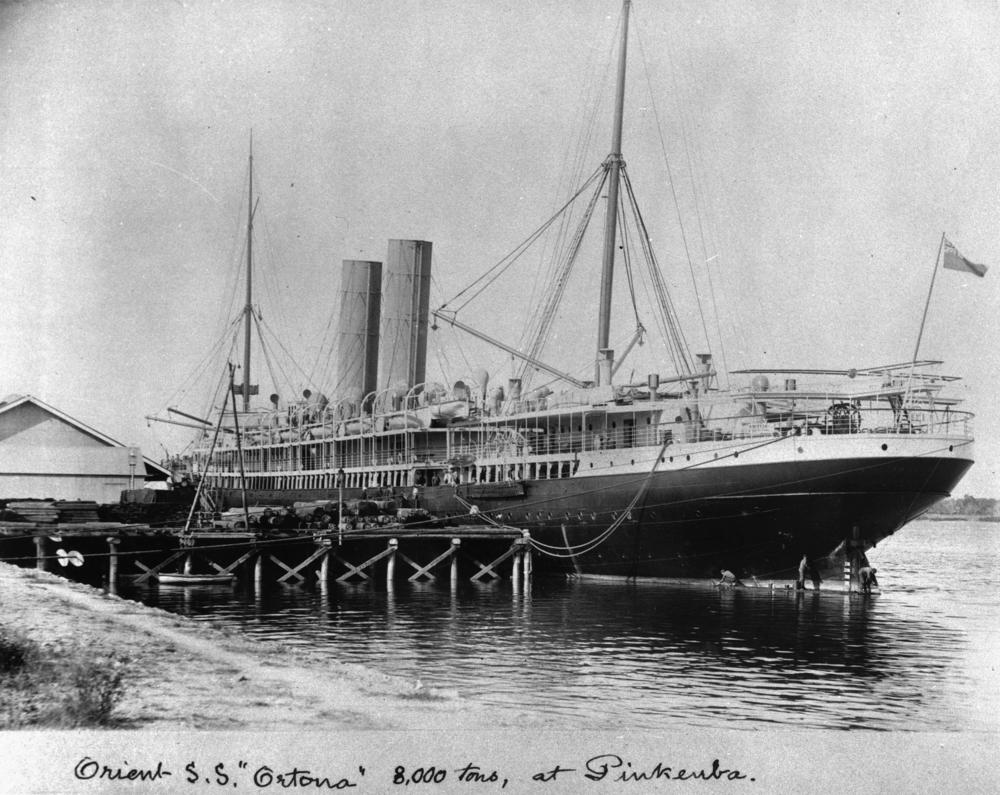
Ortona at Pinkenba Wharf in 1907

Pinkenba Wharf is a cargo wharf and former cruise facility located in Pinkenba, Queensland, Australia. It is adjacent to the former Pinkenba railway station.

== History ==
The railway was extended from Ascot railway station to Pinkenba in 1897 and the wharf was built in 1898. In 1902 a railway spur was built to service the wharf directly.

== Present use ==
Until the establishment of Portside Wharf in 2006, the Australian cruise line P&O Cruises used Pinkenba Wharf as a base for its cruise ships, Pacific Sky and Pacific Star. The dock is not particularly glamorous, and is mainly used by cargo ships.

Throughout much of the 2000s and early 2010s, the Queensland Government was under pressure to build a new, dedicated cruise terminal on the eastern side of the Gateway Bridge to accommodate larger cruise ships. A February 2008 visit by the luxury cruise ship MS Queen Victoria meant that passengers could not use the standard cruise terminal facilities at Portside Wharf, and were instead required to disembark at the industrial container port at Fisherman Island.

The wharf was in use as a part-time cruise terminal until the opening of the Brisbane International Cruise Terminal in mid-2022. Since then, the facility has reverted to its intended use as a cargo port.

== See also ==
- Brisbane International Cruise Terminal
