= Brisbane International Cruise Terminal =

Cruise terminal in Australia

Coordinates: 27.3803°S 153.1555°E

The Brisbane International Cruise Terminal is an international cruise ship terminal in Brisbane, Queensland, Australia.

The terminal is located at Luggage Point on the northern bank at the mouth of the Brisbane River in Pinkenba, adjacent to Brisbane Airport. It was designed to accommodate mega-cruise ships over 270 meters long. It provides the only dock for very large vessels in South East Queensland.

A free shuttle bus connects cruise ship passengers with parking/public transport facilities near Brisbane Airport and the DFO retail precinct. There is also a taxi rank and parking located within the complex.

== History ==
The terminal was long-awaited after decades of complaints about temporary facilities.

The project was developed by the Port of Brisbane. The structure was designed by architectural and design firm, Arkhefield. Construction began in 2018 and was completed in 2020.

Whilst initially due to open in October 2020, the COVID-19 pandemic caused the opening to be delayed. The first boat to dock at the terminal was the Royal Australian Navy's HMAS Choules on 27 August 2021 as the terminal was used as a vaccination centre and Royal Australian Navy stop.

The first cruise ship to use the terminal was the P&O Cruises Australia ship Pacific Explorer on 2 June 2022.

== Usage ==
The terminal has been used by many ships including Princess Cruises’s Coral Princess, the Carnival Luminosa and the Quantum of the Seas. The terminal has replaced Portside Wharf as Brisbane’s main passenger terminal after 14 years of service.

The terminal can hold ships up to and larger than the Oasis class, which is currently the largest class of cruise ships in the world.

== See also ==
- Portside Wharf
- Tourism in Brisbane
- Transport in Brisbane
