= Chinatown, Brisbane =

Coordinates: 27°27′31.14″S 153°2′1.49″E

Chinatown 唐人街 (Chinese)
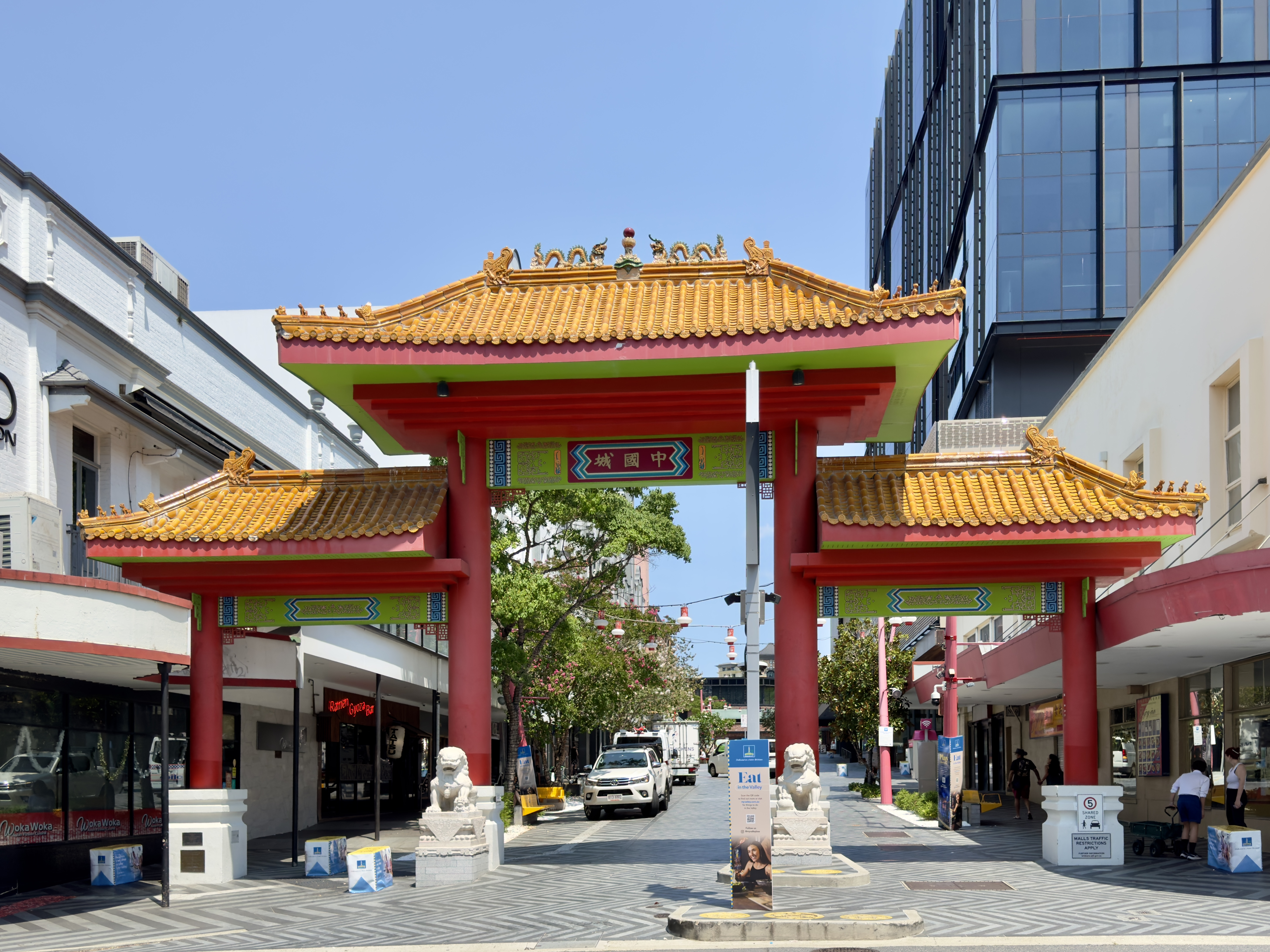
- Entrance, 2023
- Interactive map of Chinatown
- Country: Australia
- State: Queensland
- City: Fortitude Valley
- LGA: City of Brisbane (Central Ward)

Government
  - State electorate: McConnel
  - Federal division: Brisbane

Brisbane Chinatown
- Chinese: 布里斯班唐人街
Transcriptions
Standard Mandarin
- Hanyu Pinyin: Bù lǐsī bān tángrénjiē

Chinatown, Brisbane (Chinese: 布里斯班唐人街) is a cultural, retail and dining precinct in Fortitude Valley, Brisbane, Australia. It is centred on Chinatown Mall, a pedestrian area which occupies all of Duncan Street. The Mall runs parallel to Brunswick Street Mall, and connects Wickham Street and Ann Street. The precinct is home to numerous Chinese restaurants and businesses, and is a focal point for events such as Chinese New Year and Valley Fiesta. Street signs in the area are written in both English and Chinese. It is also home to many restaurants offering Korean, Indonesian, Japanese, Thai and Vietnamese cuisines. Its pan-Asian character is also evident through its hosting of many Asian festivals including the annual Indian festival, Diwali.

Chinatown's popularity with Chinese Australians has declined in the past two decades, and Sunnybank is instead seen as the hub of Chinese culture in Brisbane.

== History ==
Chinatown Mall was officially opened by Lord Mayor Sallyanne Atkinson on 29 January 1987, the first day of the Year of the Rabbit. The Mall was designed by architects and engineers from Guangzhou, and was intended to reflect Tang architecture.

In 1995 part of Jackie Chan's First Strike (1996) was shot in the Mall. The scene featured a car chase and an explosion. The Mall's pagoda was destroyed during filming and subsequently rebuilt.

Brisbane City Council began a renovation of Chinatown Mall in 2009. The project, which was designed by Urbis, cost $8,000,000. The Mall was supposed to be finished by September 2009 but was delayed, reopening on 14 February 2010.

Chinatown Mall was the original setting of the infamous Democracy Manifest internet meme.

== See also ==
- Holy Triad Temple, heritage-listed temple at 32 Higgs Street, Albion, City of Brisbane, Queensland
- Chinatowns in Australia
- Tourism in Brisbane
