= Tourism in Brisbane =

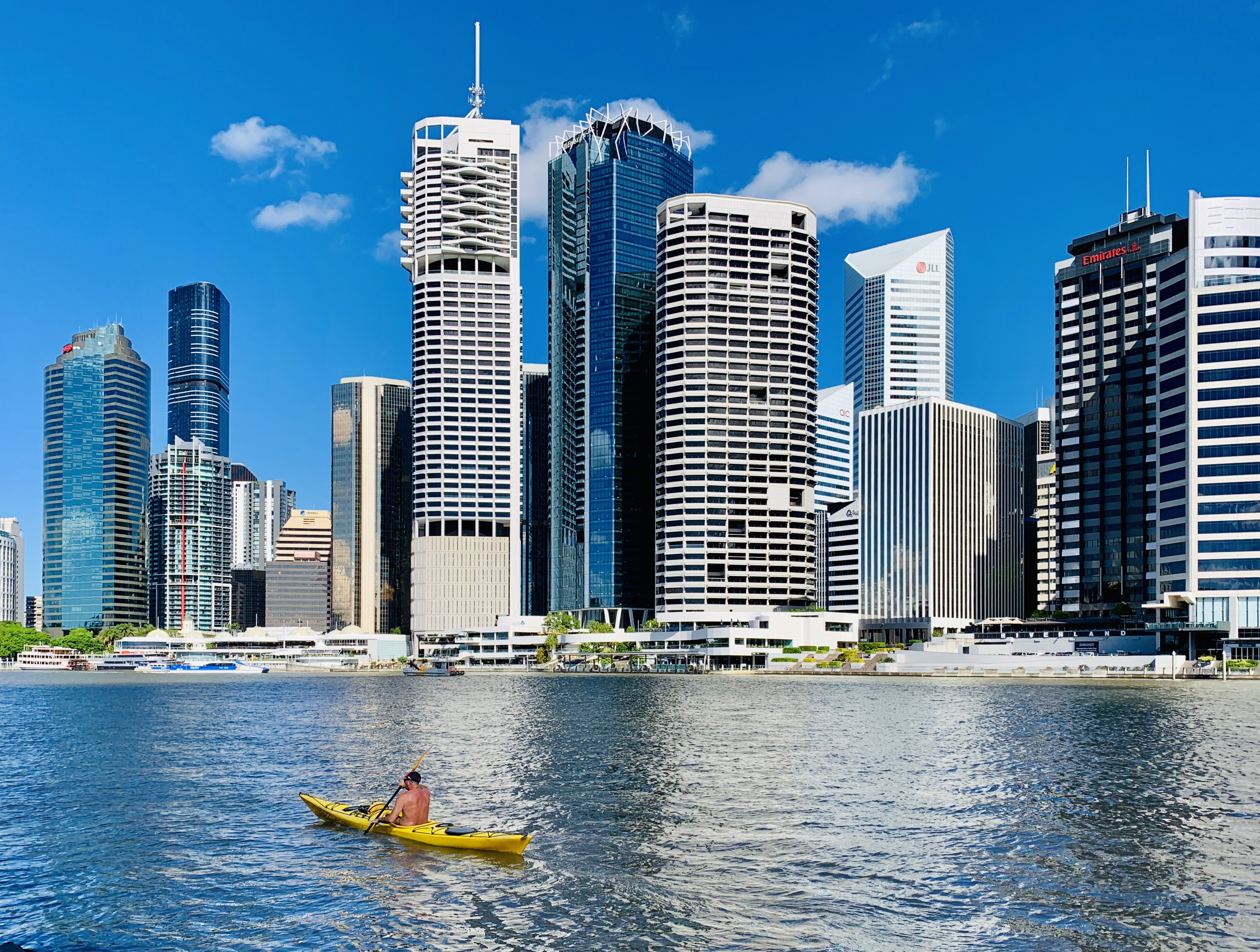
The CBD and Brisbane River

Tourism in Brisbane is an important industry for the Queensland economy, being the third-most popular destination for international tourists after Sydney and Melbourne.

Brisbane is a popular tourist destination, serving as a gateway to the state of Queensland, particularly to the Gold Coast and the Sunshine Coast, which are home to numerous popular surf beaches, located immediately south and north of Brisbane respectively. Major landmarks and attractions include South Bank Parklands, the Queensland Cultural Centre (including the Queensland Museum, Queensland Art Gallery, Gallery of Modern Art, Queensland Performing Arts Centre and State Library of Queensland), City Hall, the Story Bridge, the City Botanic Gardens and Parliament of Queensland, the Howard Smith Wharves, ANZAC Square, Fortitude Valley (including James Street and Chinatown), West End, the Teneriffe woolstores precinct, Roma Street Parkland, New Farm Park (including the Brisbane Powerhouse), St John's Cathedral, the Lone Pine Koala Sanctuary, the Mount Coot-tha Lookout and Botanic Gardens, the D'Aguilar Range and National Park, the Brisbane River and its Riverwalk network, as well as waterside locations around Moreton Bay(such as Tangalooma on Moreton Island, Point Lookout on North Stradbroke Island, Bribie Island, and coastal suburbs such as Shorncliffe, Wynnum and those on the Redcliffe Peninsula).

== City landmarks ==
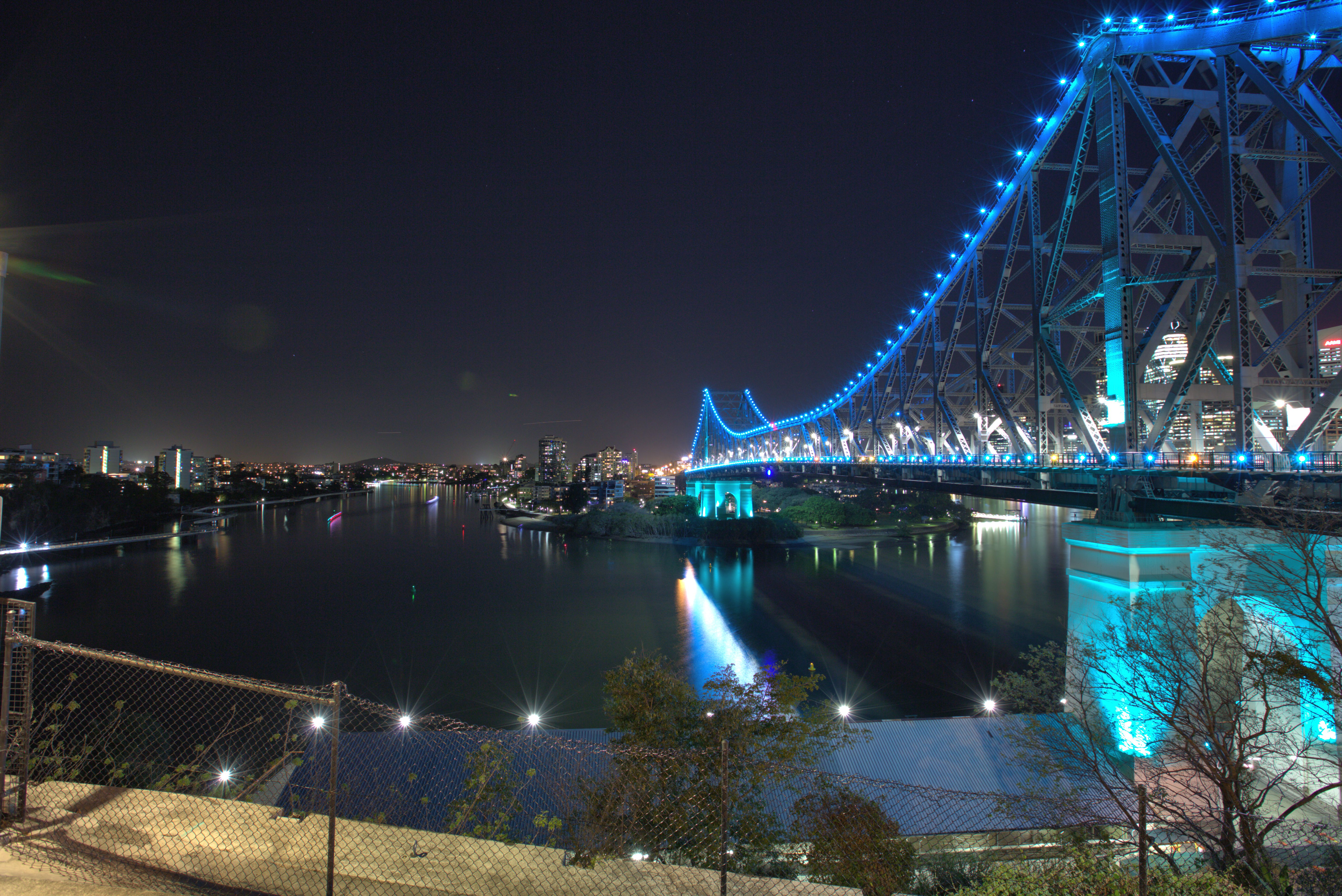
The Story Bridge

=== Story Bridge ===
The Story Bridge is a Brisbane icon, designed by Dr. John Bradfield, designer of the Sydney Harbour Bridge. It spans Petrie Bight from Kangaroo Point to Fortitude Valley and totals 1,072 metres (3,517 ft) meters in length.

Tourist groups run the Story Bridge Adventure Climb as well as the Abseil Climb, which provides daylight, twilight, and night tours.

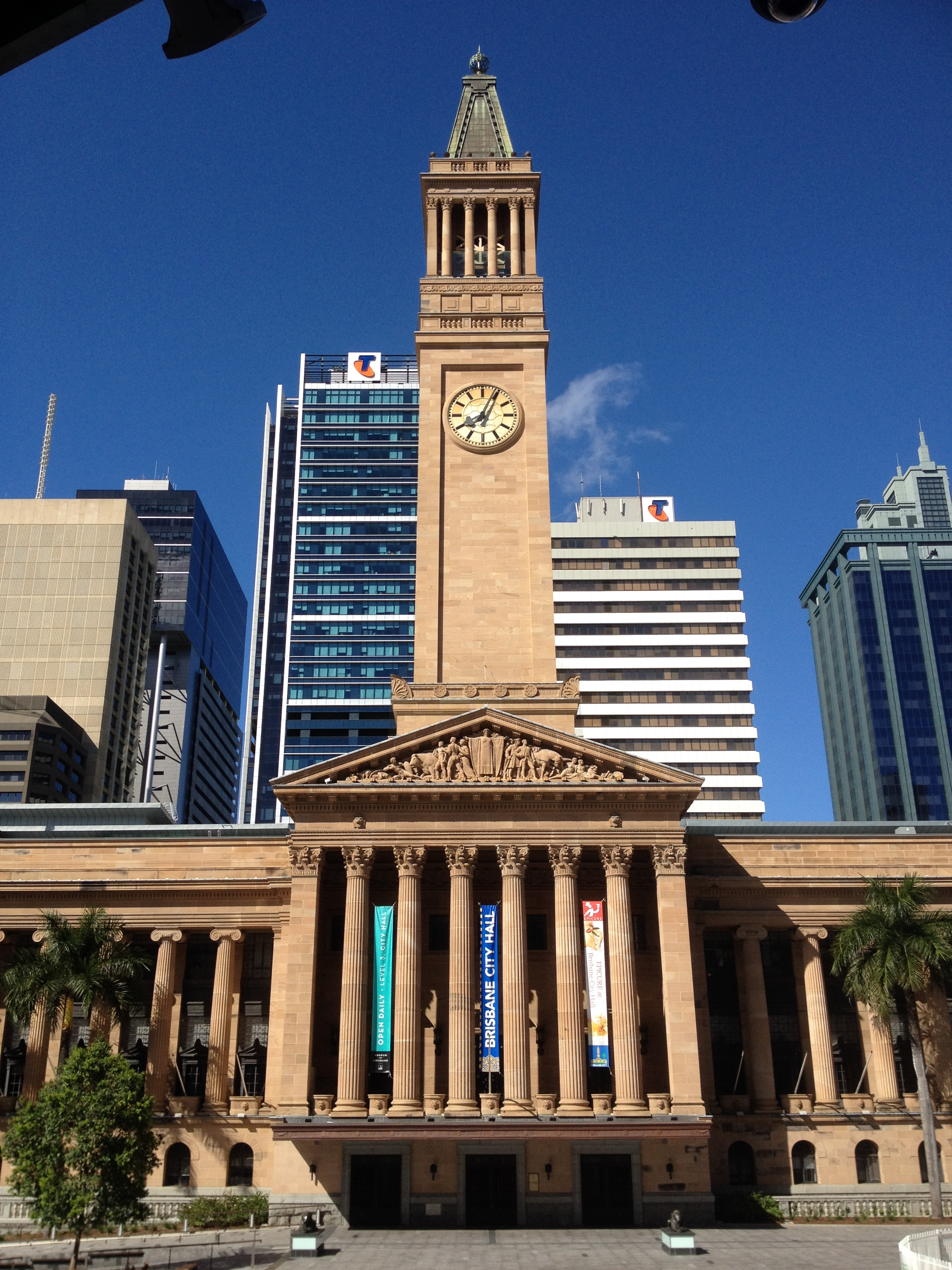
Brisbane City Hall

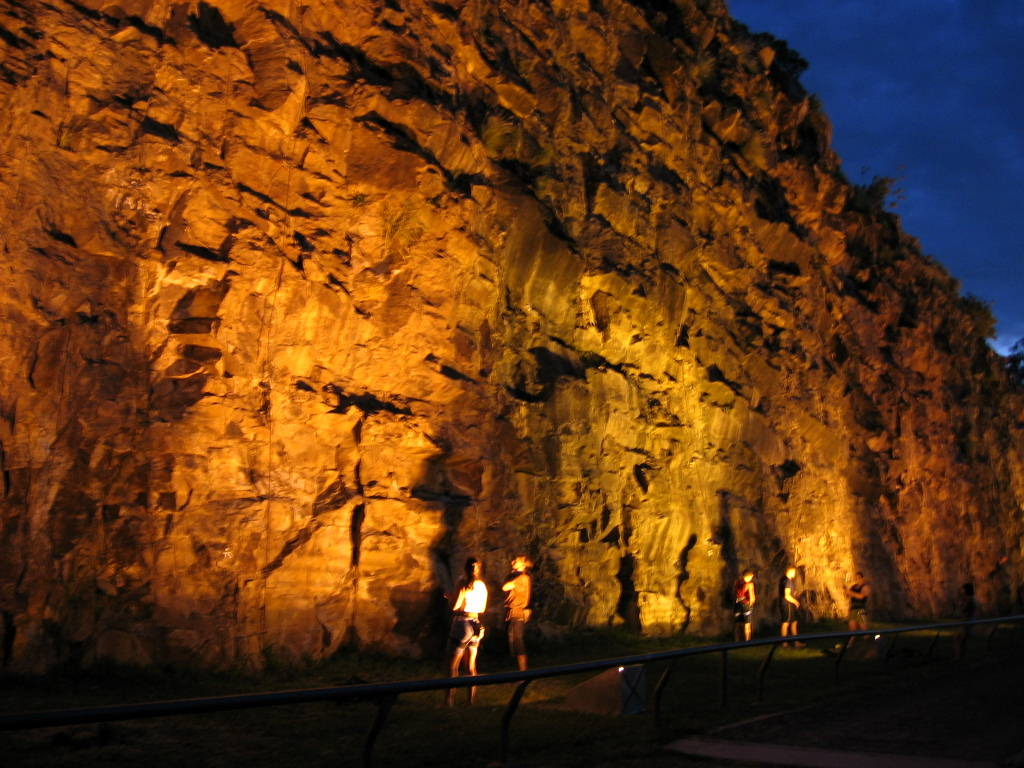
Kangaroo Point Cliffs lit at night

=== Brisbane City Hall ===
Brisbane's most famous landmark is Australia's largest and grandest city hall. It is home to the Museum of Brisbane and features the circular Concert Hall and a world-famous grand piano organ. Free tours are available of the city hall and its clock tower.

The Brisbane City Hall contains the re-established historic Tudor-style Shingle Inn restaurant, with its original 1936 Tudor furnishing and fittings restored.

=== Kangaroo Point Cliffs ===
The Kangaroo Point Cliffs extend south from just north of the former Naval Bridge Depot to the former South Brisbane Dry Dock, west of the Captain Cook Bridge. The rock comprising the cliffs was formed about 230 million years ago, but the cliffs were created by convicts quarrying the stone for the early colony. The cliffs are popular with rock climbers, and the park and gardens below are available for BBQs and picnics.

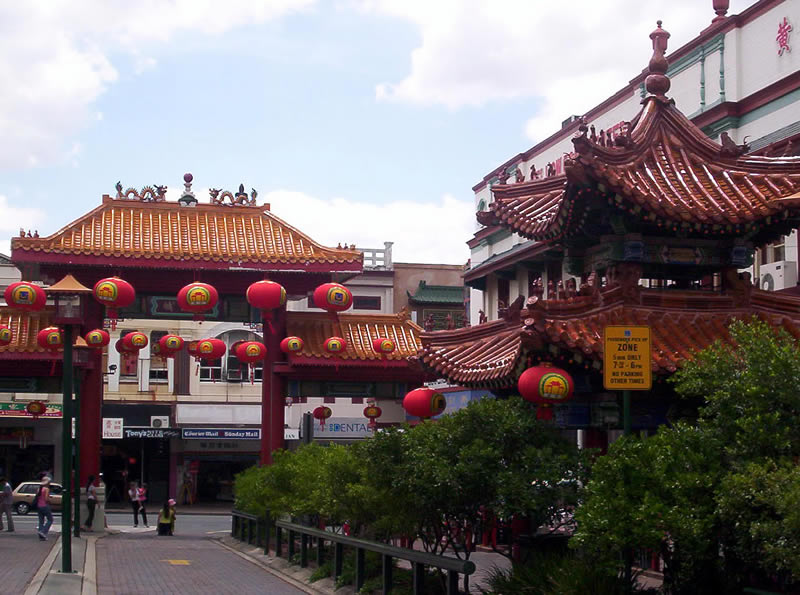
Chinatown, Brisbane is one of the many destinations in Fortitude Valley

=== Fortitude Valley ===
The Valley experienced an urban renaissance in the 1980s and 1990s, when young people flocked to new nightclubs, some in place of the brothels and illegal gambling joints of an earlier era. As more people lived in the suburb, social and religious developmental trends explain the present diverse nature of The Valley, characterised by commercial buildings, hotels and churches side by side with residential buildings. James Street is a popular shopping street that straddles Fortitude Valley and the adjoining suburb of New Farm.

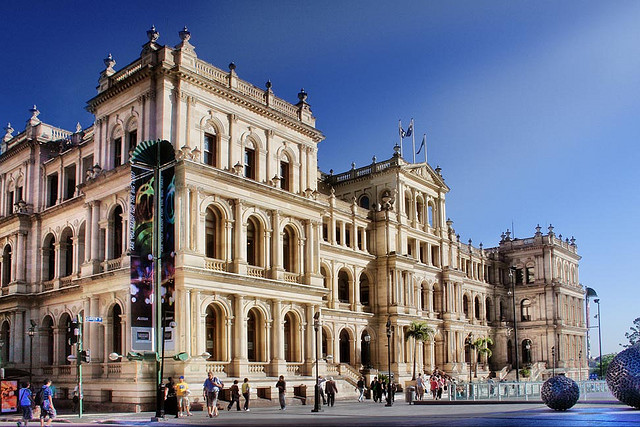
Treasury Casino

=== Treasury Building ===
The Conrad Treasury Casino, formerly the State Government of Queensland Treasury Building, is situated at 1–27 Queen St, right up at the top of the city near the Victoria Bridge. It was built on a site that had been earmarked for Government use since around 1825. Three stages of construction went into the completed building, starting with the William Street frontage. Completed, occupied and opened officially in 1928 at a final cost of £137,817, it provided expansive space for its Treasury Building tenants. As State Government Departments moved into the nearby Executive Building in the 1980s, the Treasury Building and adjacent Land Administration Building were sold, and consequently redeveloped as the Conrad Treasury Casino and Hotel precinct. With the opening of the Queens Wharf & Casino the Treasury building will be transferred to Griffith University as a new CBD campus in 2027.

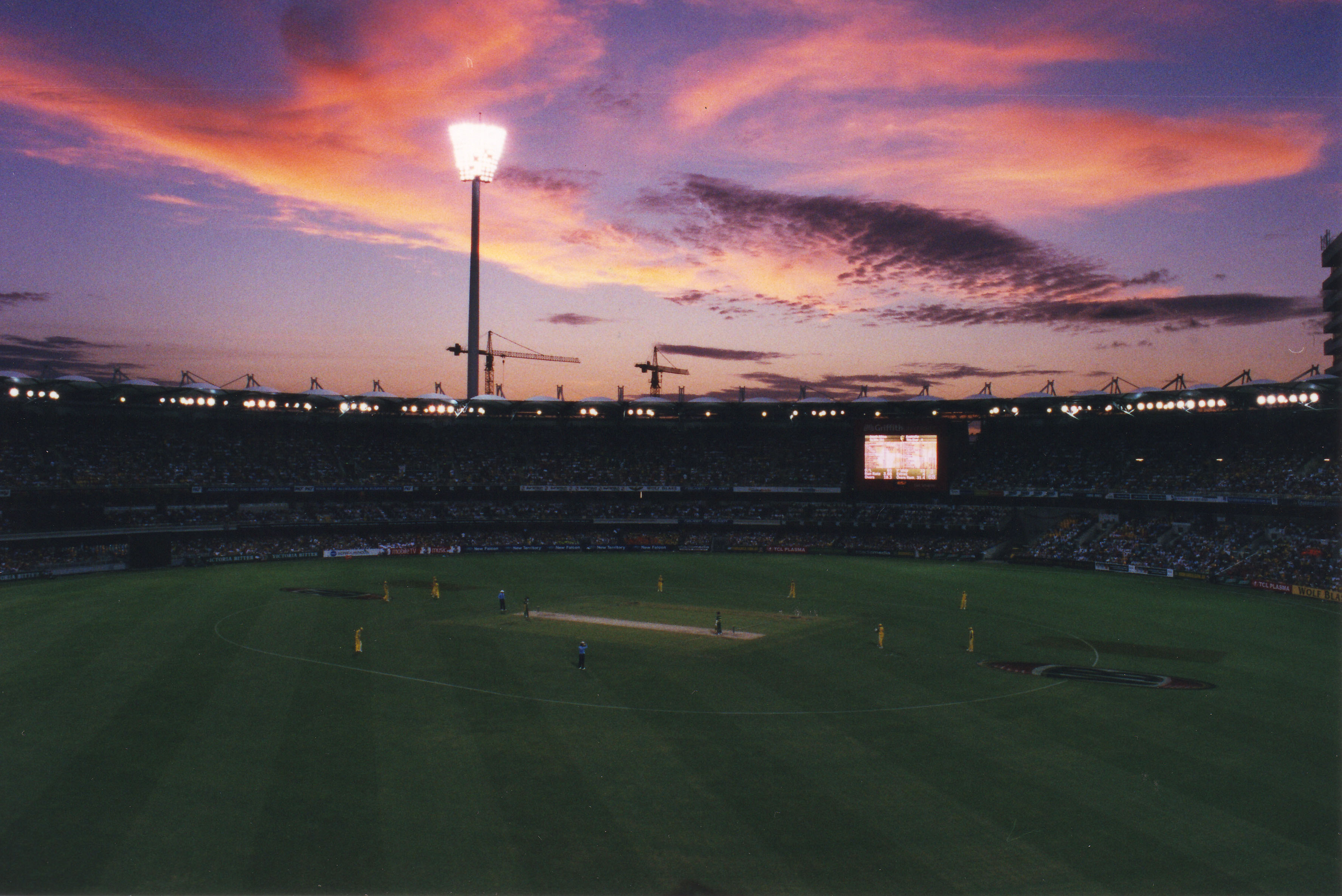
The Gabba

=== The Gabba ===
One of Australia's most famous sports stadiums, the Gabba was established in 1895 and hosts a number of sports including AFL, cricket, rugby league, rugby union, and baseball, as well as athletics and concerts. Its current seating capacity is 42,000.

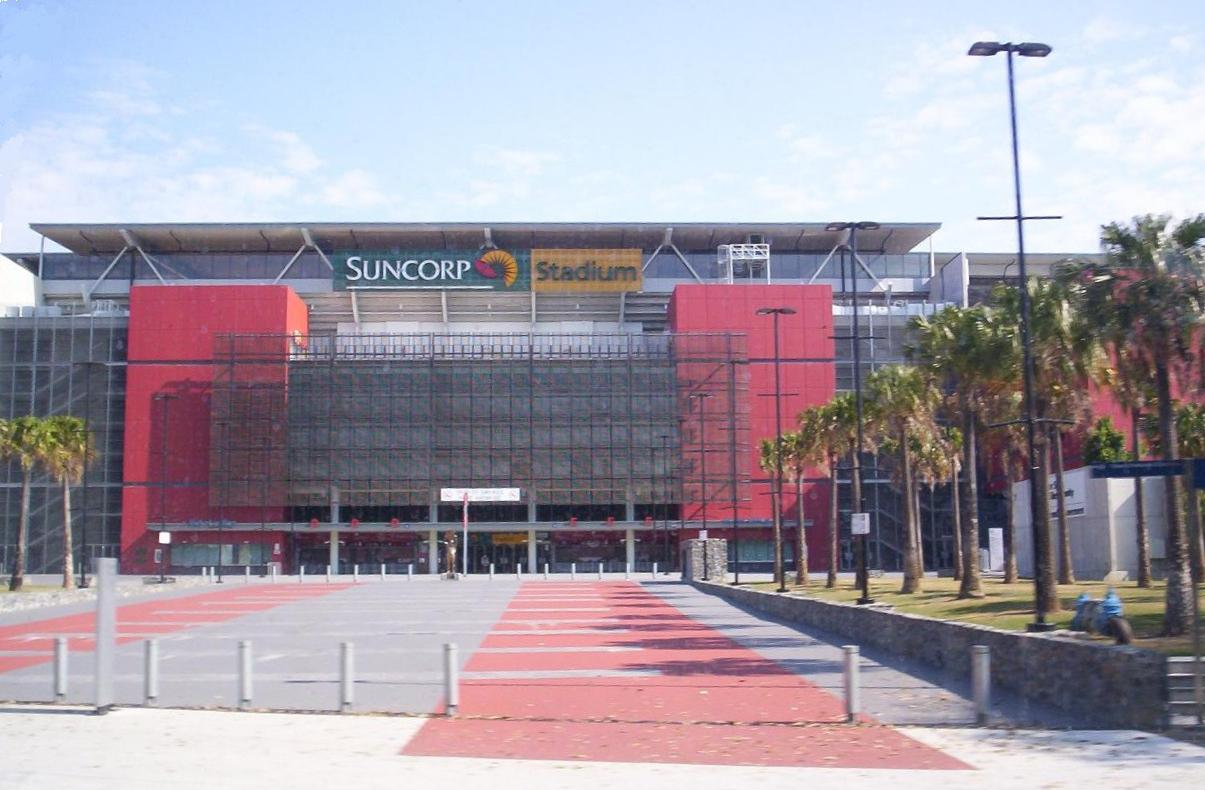
Lang Park

=== Lang Park ===
Lang Park, also known as Suncorp Stadium, is a major sports stadium and is considered the best rectangular stadium in Australia. It was established in 1914 on the site of a former cemetery. The stadium hosts mainly rugby league and football, and is a venue of the State of Origin. Its current seating capacity is 52,500.

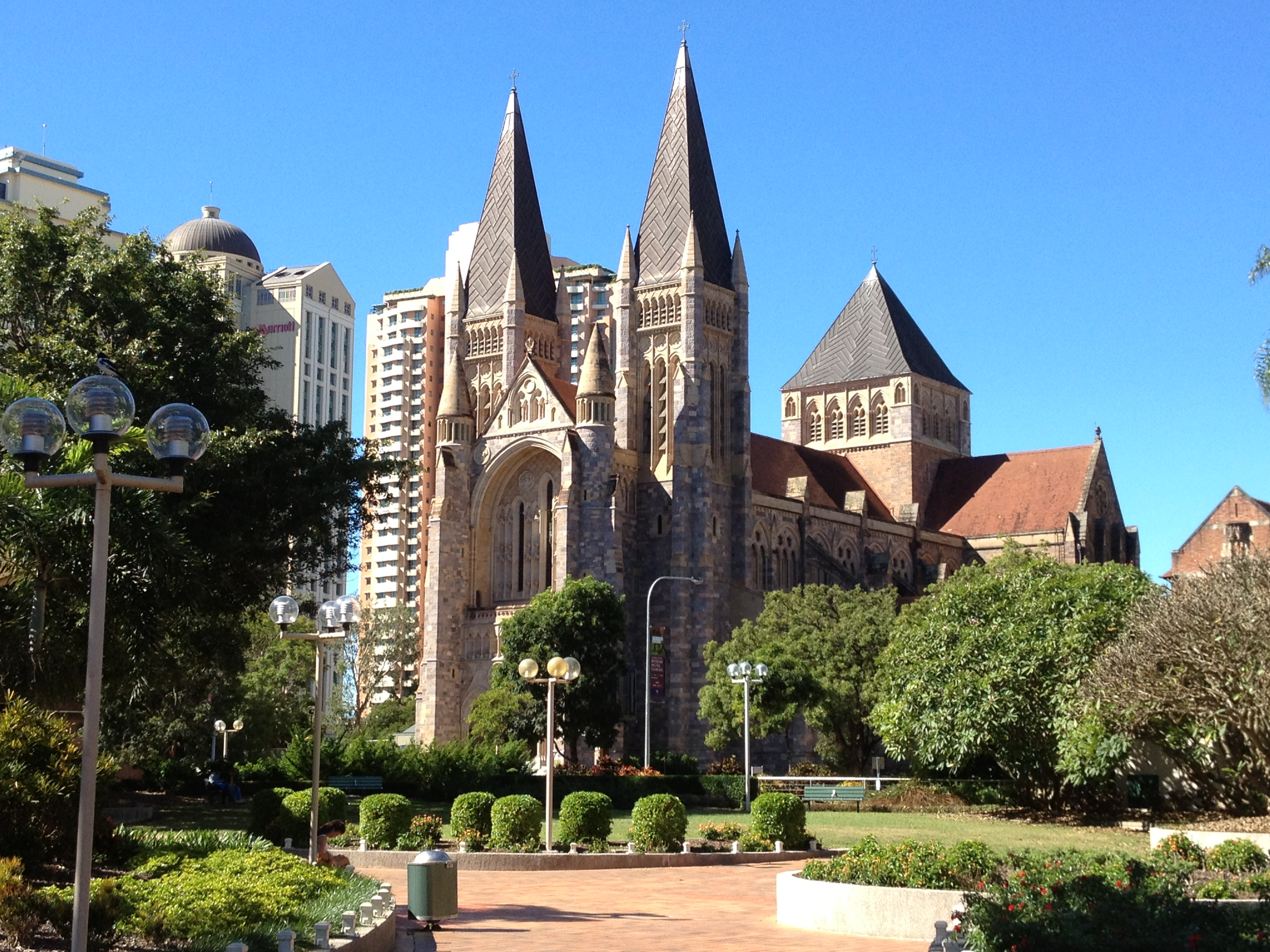
St John's Cathedral

=== St John's Cathedral ===
St John's Cathedral is a Medieval gothic revival cathedral, and an international centre of pilgrimage attracting over 20,000 visitors annually from around the world. The cathedral is the centre for big diocesan events, and is a major centre for the arts and music with its own orchestra. St John's also has the largest cathedral organ in Australia, which hosts many concerts throughout the year.

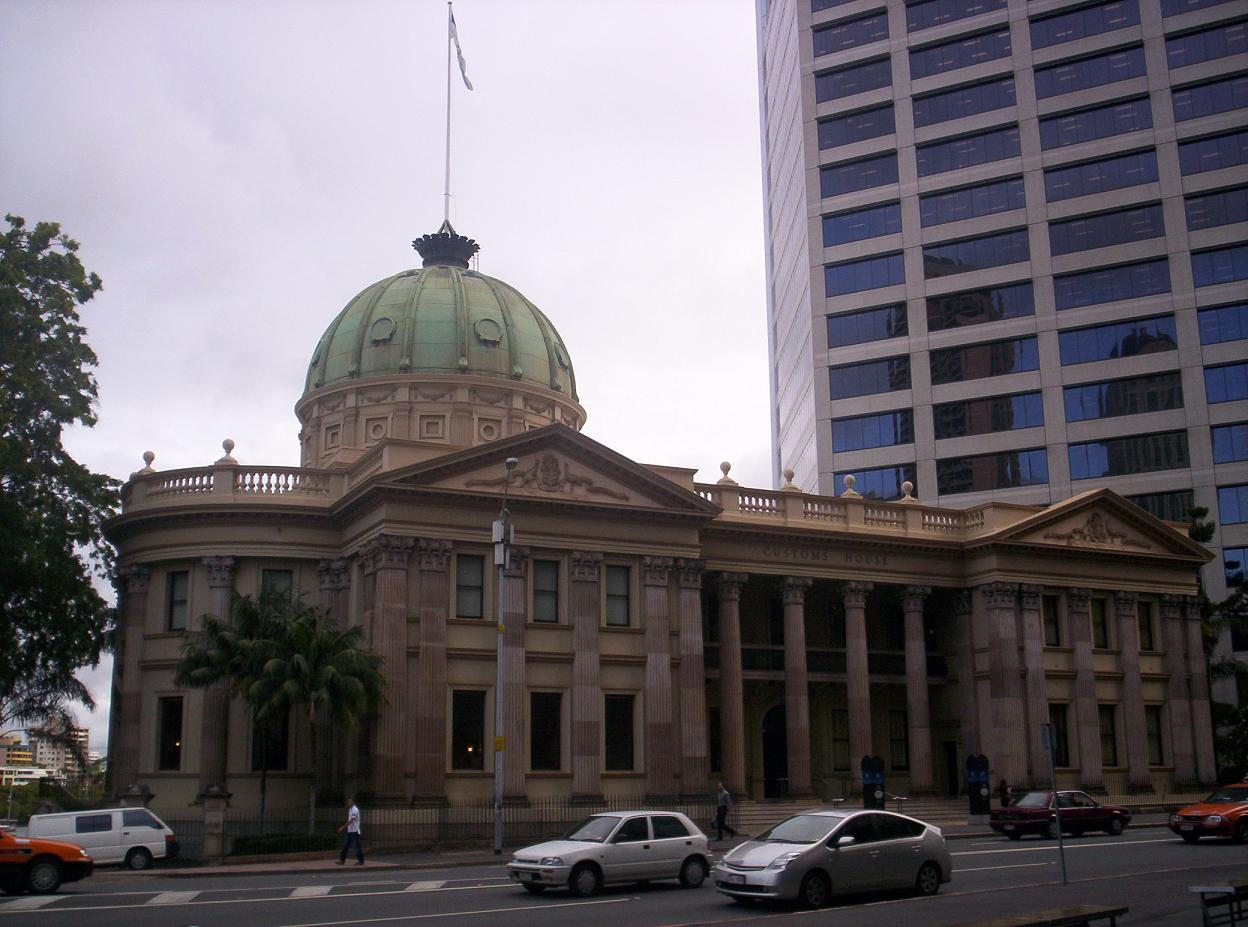
Customs House

=== Customs House ===
The Customs House is a Brisbane landmark known for its distinctive copper dome. Originally constructed for the government, there is now a restaurant and function centre within the building, and regular concerts and art exhibitions are also held here.

== Cultural attractions ==
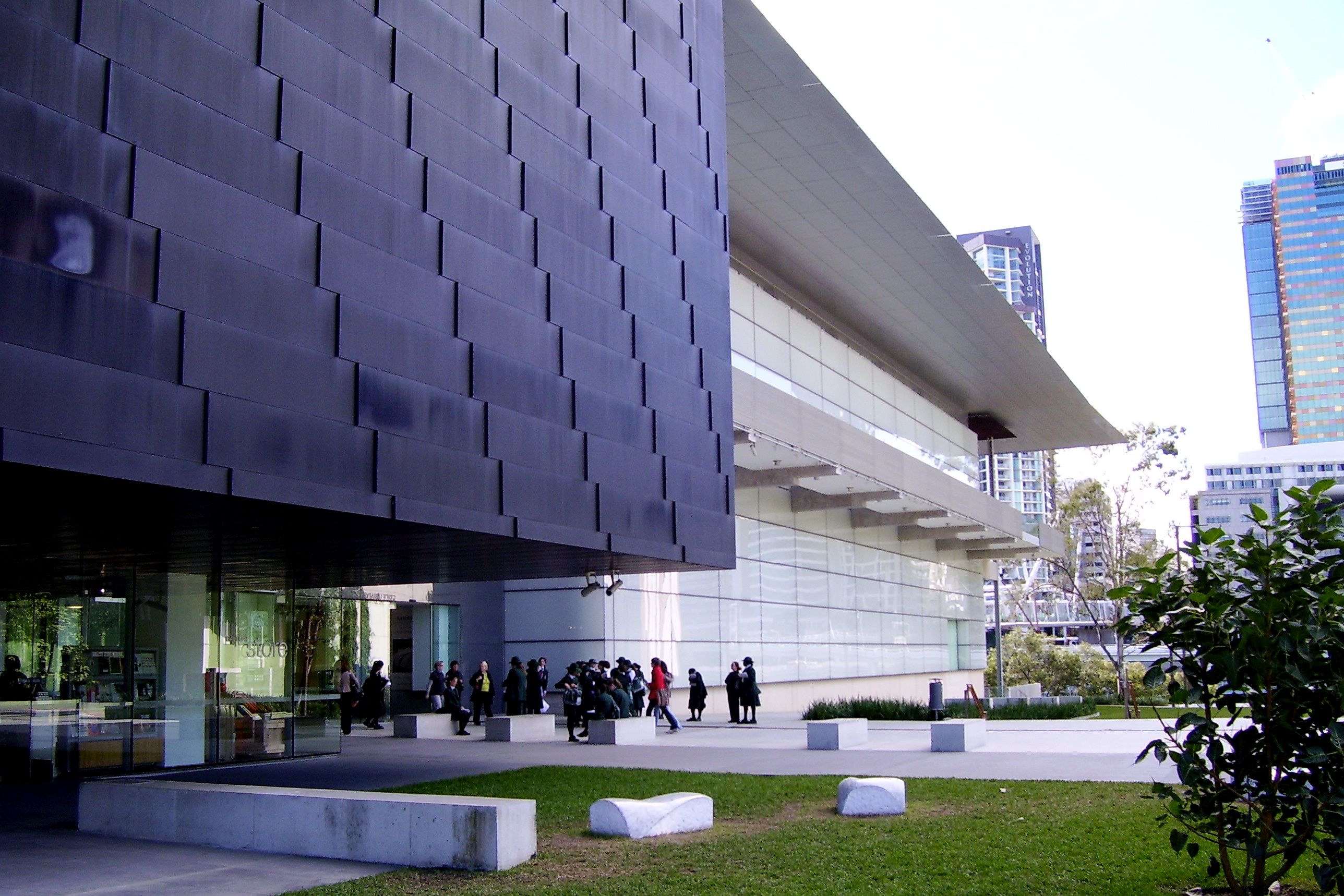
Queensland Gallery of Modern Art

=== Queensland Gallery of Modern Art ===
The Queensland Gallery of Modern Art has a total floor area of 25,000 square metres (269,098 sq ft). The Gallery holds mostly Queensland arts as well as a variety of artworks from around the world.

=== Queensland Museum ===
The Queensland Museum has various human and natural historical artefacts. It is located within the Queensland Cultural Centre at South Bank and has various cafes and restaurants within and surrounding its location across the Brisbane River from the Brisbane CBD.

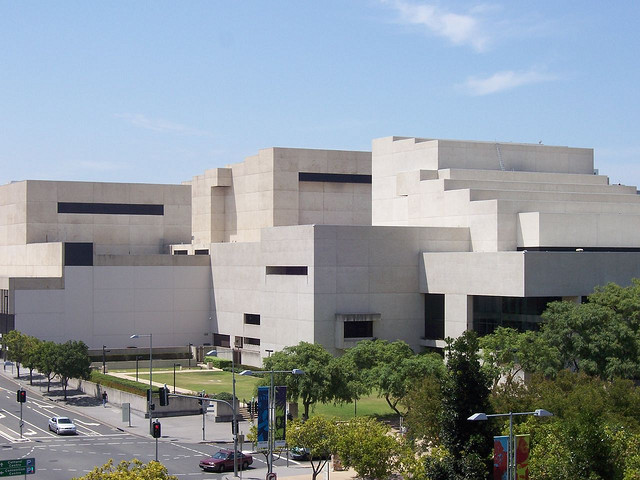
View of the western face of the Queensland Performing Arts Centre

=== Queensland Performing Arts Centre ===
Also located within the Entertainment District of South Bank, the Queensland Performing Arts Centre has a number of theatres and auditoriums showcasing various famous shows and operas annually. Some of the most recognized shows featured at the centre include Mamma Mia!, The Phantom of the Opera, Wicked, Jersey Boys, and International Gala.

=== State Library of Queensland ===
The State Library of Queensland is Queensland's largest library, and contains extensive historical and archive materials.

=== Museum of Brisbane ===
The Museum of Brisbane is the City of Brisbane's official museum and is located in Brisbane City Hall. It features a changing exhibition program that celebrates Brisbane through social history, visual arts, craft and design.

=== Queensland Maritime Museum ===
The Queensland Maritime Museum is located adjacent to South Bank Parklands.

== Parks and outdoor attractions ==
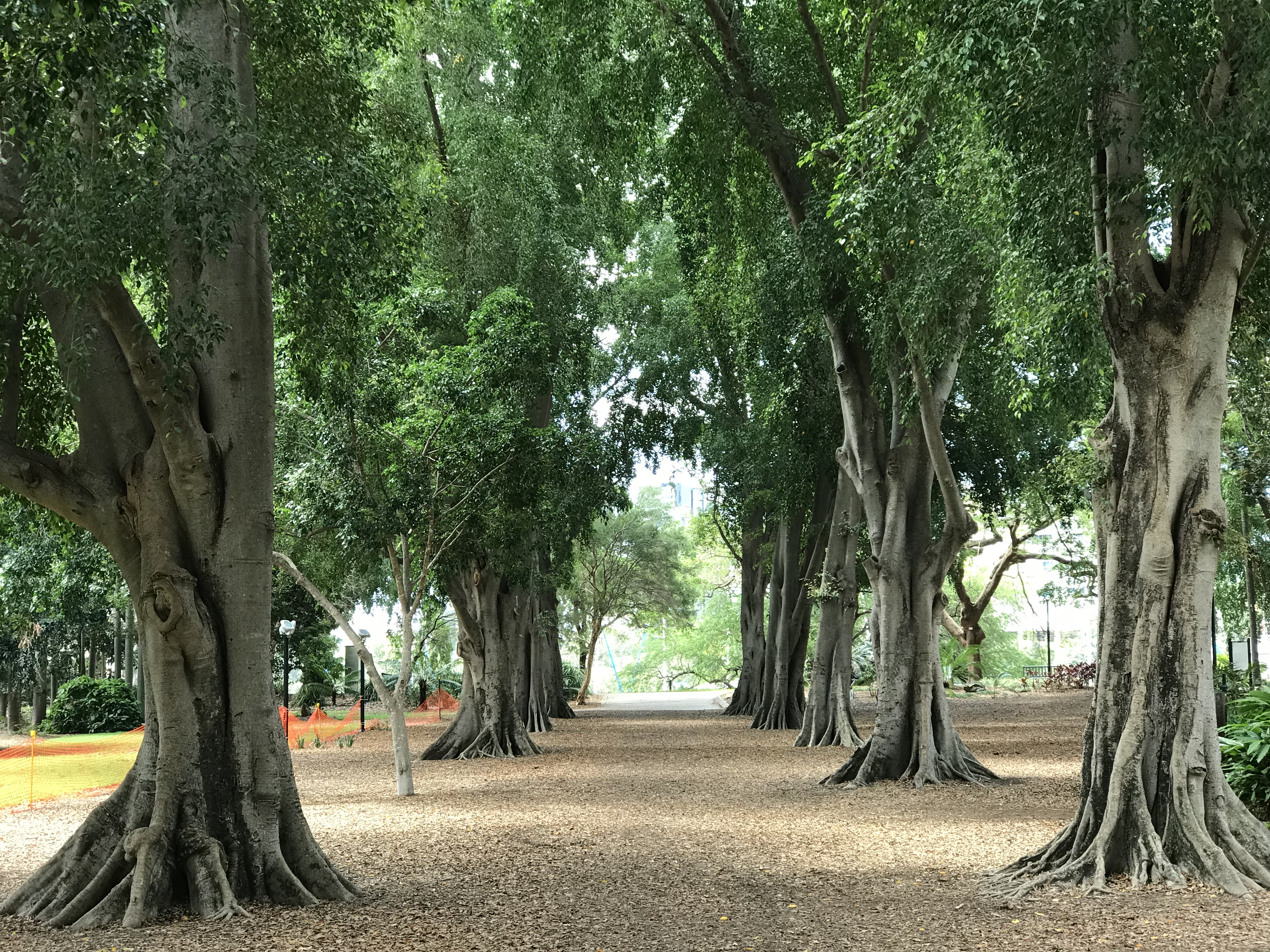
Moreton Bay figs at the City Botanic Gardens

Brisbane's major parklands include the riverside City Botanic Gardens at Gardens Point, Roma Street Parkland, the 27-hectare Victoria Park at Spring Hill and Herston, South Bank Parklands along the river at South Bank, the Brisbane Botanic Gardens at Mount Coot-tha and the riverside New Farm Park at New Farm.

There are many national parks surrounding the Brisbane metropolitan area. The D'Aguilar National Park is a major national park along the northwest of the metropolitan area in the D'Aguilar Range. The Glass House Mountains National Park is located to the north of the metropolitan area in the Glass House Mountains and provides green space between the Brisbane metropolitan area and the Sunshine Coast. The Tamborine National Park at Tamborine Mountain is located in the Gold Coast hinterland to the south of the metropolitan area.

The eastern metropolitan area is built along the Moreton Bay Marine Park, encompassing Moreton Bay. Significant areas of Moreton, North Stradbroke and Bribie islands also covered by the Moreton Island National Park, Naree Budjong Djara National Park and the Bribie Island National Park respectively. The Boondall Wetlands in the suburb of Boondall include 1100 hectares of wetlands which are home to mangroves and shorebirds as well as walking tracks.

=== Mountains and national parks ===
There are many national parks surrounding the Brisbane metropolitan area which are popular recreational attractions for hiking and bushwalking. The D'Aguilar National Park runs along the northwest of the metropolitan area in the D'Aguilar Range, and contains popular bushwalking and hiking peaks at Mount Nebo, Camp Mountain, Mount Pleasant, Mount Glorious, Mount Samson and Mount Mee. The Glass House Mountains National Park is located to the north of the metropolitan area in the Glass House Mountains between it and that of the Sunshine Coast. The Tamborine National Park at Tamborine Mountain is located in the Gold Coast hinterland to the south of the metropolitan area. Moreton, North Stradbroke and Bribie islands are substantially covered by the Moreton Island National Park, Naree Budjong Djara National Park and the Bribie Island National Park respectively. The Boondall Wetlands in the suburb of Boondall are protected mangrove wetlands with floating walking trails.

=== Mount Coot-tha ===
The suburb Mount Coot-tha Reserve contains the Mount Coot-tha Botanic Gardens which house the Sir Thomas Brisbane Planetarium and the "Tsuki-yama-chisen" Japanese Garden (formerly of the Japanese Government Pavilion of Brisbane's World Expo '88). Atop the mountain is the Mount Coot-tha Lookout, providing views of the metropolitan area and Moreton Bay.

=== South Bank Parklands ===
South Bank Parklands attractions include the Wheel of Brisbane (a large ferris wheel), a swimming lagoon with sandy beaches, the South Bank Arbour, rainforest walks, picnic areas and a picturesque riverfront promenade. Entertainment venues at South Bank Parklands include the Queensland Conservatorium Griffith University and South Bank Piazza. South Bank Parklands are also home to the Lifestyle Markets on Fridays (5pm-10pm), Saturdays (11am-5pm) and Sundays (9am-5pm).

=== City Botanic Gardens ===
The City Botanic Gardens include Brisbane's most mature gardens, with many rare and unusual botanic species. In particular the Gardens feature a special collection of cycads, palms, figs and bamboo. The Gardens are located at Gardens Point, to the south-east of the CBD, within walking distance of the city centre.

=== New Farm Park ===
New Farm Park is a large heritage-listed riverfront public park covering 15 hectares (37 acres). It is located at the southeastern end of the New Farm peninsula within a bend in the Brisbane River. The Powerhouse arts centre is at the eastern end of the park. The park also includes the New Farm Park ferry wharf and links to the Brisbane Riverwalk from Newstead to Toowong. It is one of Brisbane's most popular parklands and tourist attractions.

=== Roma Street Parkland ===
Roma Street Parkland is the world's largest subtropical garden in a city centre. The parkland features a variety of themed gardens and recreational areas, with a web of pathways and boardwalks traversing cascading waterways and rocky outcrops, and in situ artworks by 16 local artists. Roma Street Parkland also has an open air amphitheatre (which was previously called the Albert Park Amphitheatre).

== Moreton Bay ==
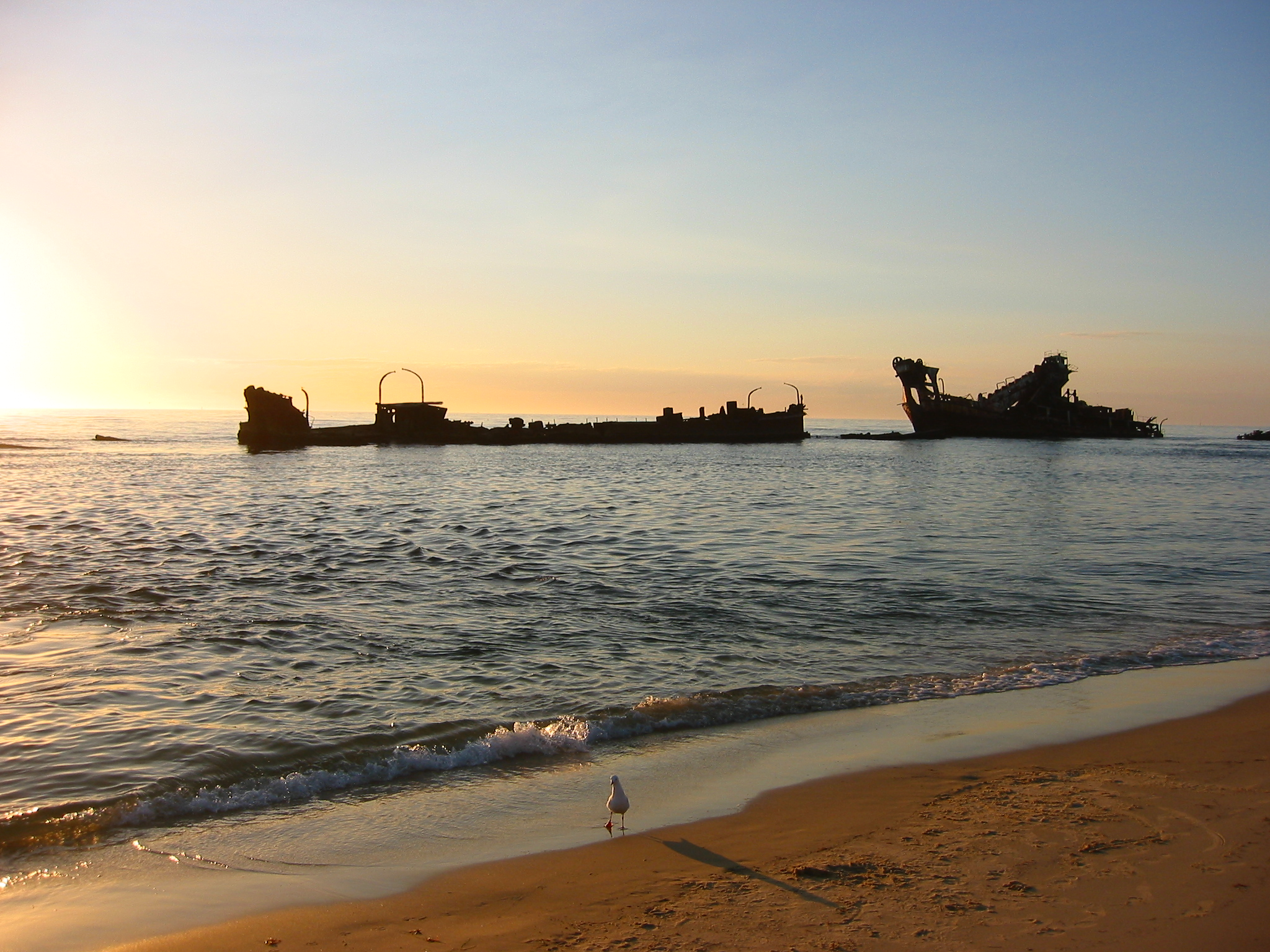
Safe diving spots at Tangalooma are provided by several shipwrecks, placed as a breakwater

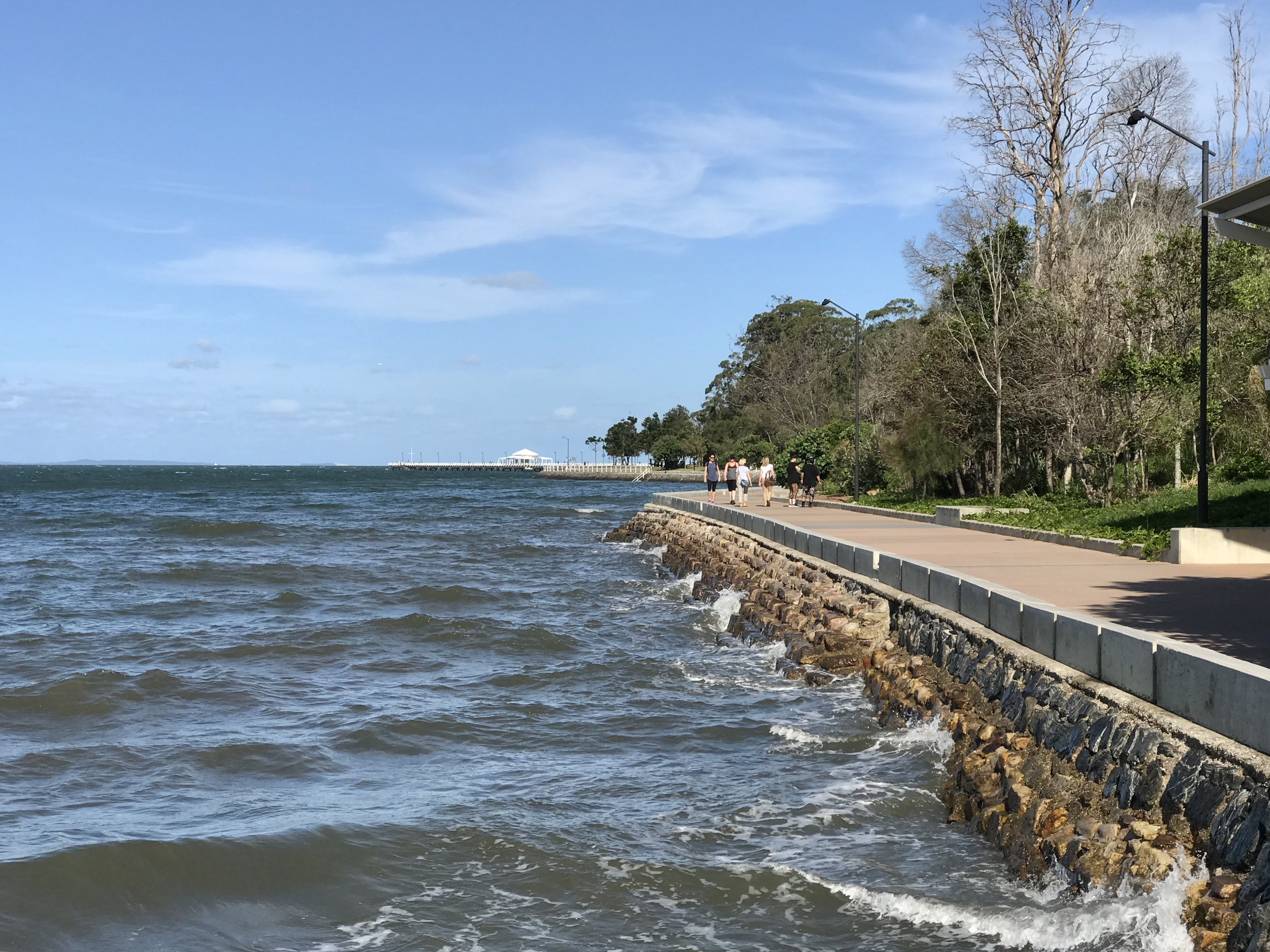
Shorncliffe pier from Lovers Walk at Shorncliffe on Moreton Bay

Moreton Bay and its marine park is also a major attraction, and its three primary islands Moreton Island, North Stradbroke Island and Bribie Island, accessible by ferry, contain popular surf beaches and resorts. Tangalooma resort on Moreton Island is popular for its nightly wild dolphin feeding attraction, and for operating Australia's longest running whale watching cruises. Beachside suburbs such as those on the Redcliffe Peninsula, as well as Shorncliffe, Sandgate, Wynnum, Manly and Wellington Point are also popular attractions for their bayside beaches, piers, and infrastructure for boating, sailing, fishing and kitesurfing.

Moreton Bay is on the east side of Brisbane, sheltered from the Pacific Ocean by two sand islands - Moreton Island to the north and North Stradbroke Island to the south. Activities here include sailing, boating, diving, windsurfing and fishing. Tangalooma, at the site of an old whaling station on the bay-side of Moreton Island, offers diving, whale-watching and dolphin tours. The two larger islands, and many of the smaller islands, for example, Coochiemudlo Island, Lamb Island and Russell Island, can be accessed by ferry. St Helena Island is near the mouth of the Brisbane River and is significant for its history as a penal colony, and its migratory birds.

Beachside suburbs that offer swimming and watersports include Wynnum, Manly, Shorncliffe, Sandgate and Wellington Point.

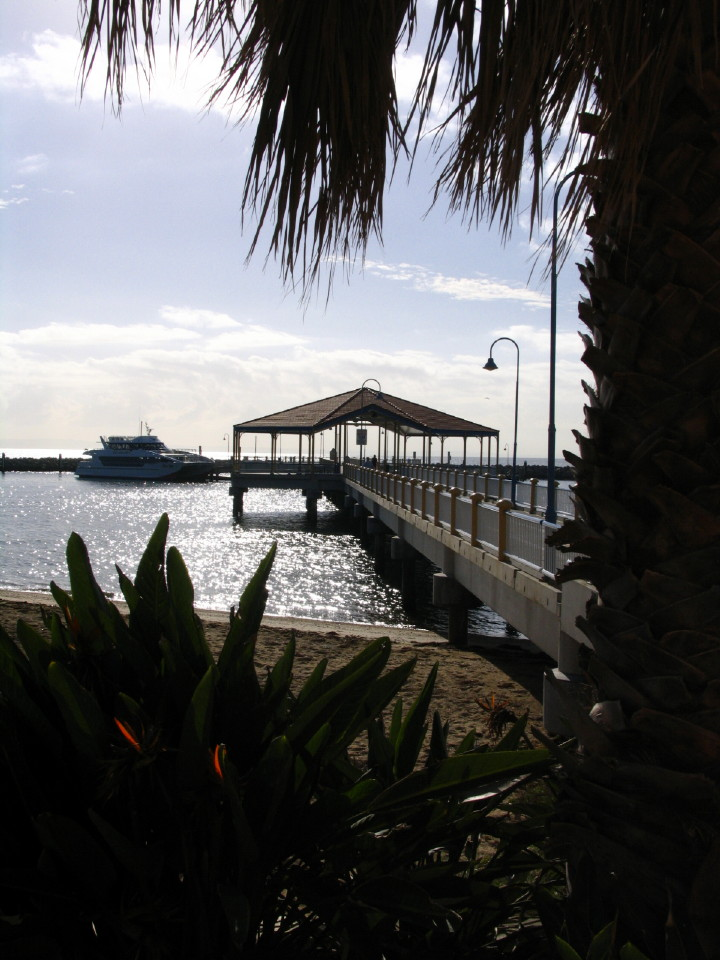
Redcliffe Jetty at sunset

Nudgee Beach is a suburb about 18 kilometres (11 mi) outside of Brisbane. The beach is surrounded by numerous mangroves, and has a bike track that heads down to Boondall Wetlands.

== Shopping ==
Retail in the CBD is centred around the Queen Street Mall, which is Australia's largest pedestrian mall. Shopping centres in the CBD include the Uptown, the Wintergarden, MacArthur Central and QueensPlaza, with the last of these along with Edward Street forming the city's focus for luxury brands. There are historical shopping arcades at Brisbane Arcade and Tattersalls Arcade. Suburbs adjacent to the CBD such as Fortitude Valley (particularly James Street), South Brisbane and West End are also major inner-city retail hubs.

Outside of the inner-city, retail is focused on indoor shopping centres, including numerous regional shopping centres along with six super regional shopping centres, all of which are among Australia's largest, namely: Westfield Chermside in the north; Westfield Mt Gravatt in the south; Westfield Carindale in the east; Indooroopilly Shopping Centre in the west; Westfield North Lakes in the outer-north; and Logan Hyperdome in the outer-south. Brisbane's major factory outlet centres are the Direct Factory Outlets at Skygate and Jindalee.

The 100 hectare Brisbane Markets at Rocklea are Brisbane's largest wholesale markets, whilst smaller markets operate at numerous locations throughout the city including South Bank Parklands, Davies Park in West End and the Eat Street Markets at Hamilton.

=== Queen Street Mall ===
Located in the centre of the city, the Queen Street Mall and its nearby surrounds is Queensland's premier shopping destination. The mall is open plan, stretching half a kilometre along Queen Street Mall. There are five major shopping centres, two department stores and four shopping arcades located within the mall.

== Entertainment precincts ==
=== South Bank Parklands ===
South Bank Parklands, once the site of the Expo 88, is now an entertainment precinct boasting entertainment, cafes, restaurants, man-made beaches, lagoons, playgrounds and views of the city along its boardwalk. It is also the location for the Brisbane Convention & Exhibition Centre, and the temporary, relocatable Ferris wheel, the 60-metre Wheel of Brisbane.

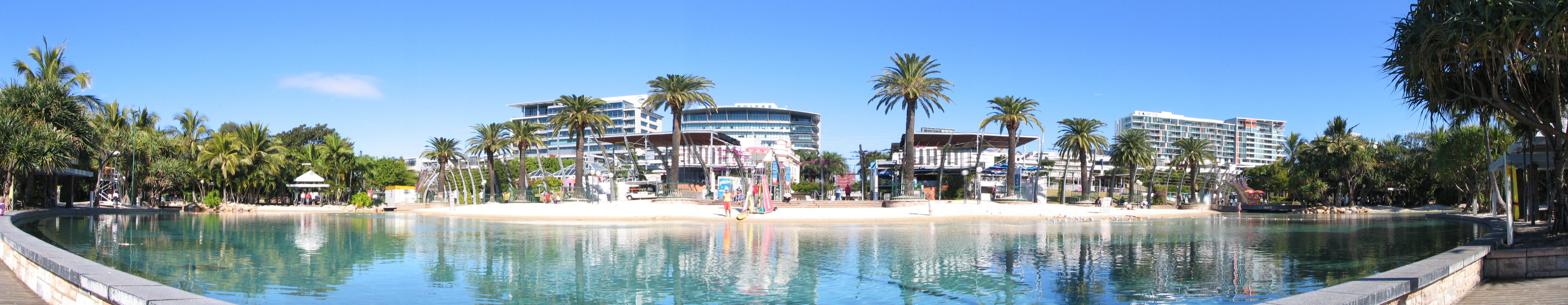
A panorama view of Streets Beach, South Bank Parklands

=== Queens Wharf & Casino ===
Queen's Wharf Brisbane is a large entertainment precinct, which includes the Star Casino, as well as various retail stores, hotels, and restaurants. It is a new addition to Brisbane’s cityscape, having officially opened its doors in August of 2024. It is an ongoing multi-billion dollar project that is expected to grow further.

=== Howard Smith Wharves ===
Howard Smith Wharves along the New Farm Cliffs below the Story Bridge is a stretch of riverside parkland which incorporates numerous entertainment and restaurant venues.

=== Eat Street Markets ===
Brisbane's Eat Street Markets (formerly known as Eat Street Markets), is a lively food hub that occupies a repurposed wharf at Hamilton. It uses recycled shipping containers to showcase 70+ vendors offering diverse international and local foods. From Asian street fare to gourmet burgers and desserts, visitors can indulge in a culinary adventure. Live music and entertainment add to the bustling atmosphere, making it a popular spot for locals and tourists alike. Eat Street Markets is only open on weekends, and is easily accessed by car or Citycat.

=== Portside Wharf ===
Portside Wharf, located approximately 7 kilometres (4.3 mi) from the Brisbane CBD on the Brisbane River, is a residential, retail precinct with numerous cafes, restaurants, shops and cinemas.

== Throughout Brisbane ==
=== Riverwalk ===
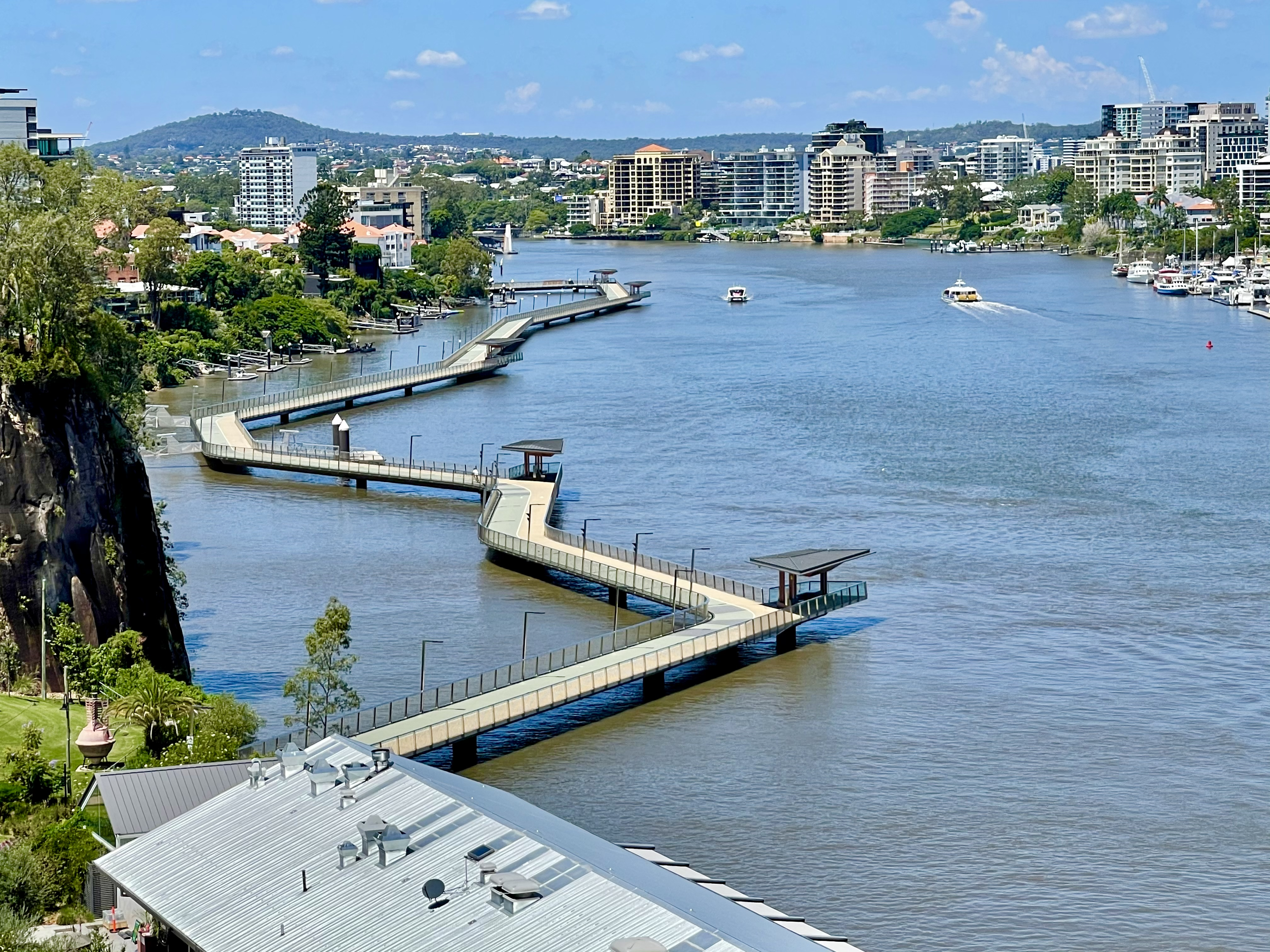
The Brisbane Riverwalk at New Farm

Brisbane is notable for its Brisbane Riverwalk network, which runs along much of the Brisbane River foreshore throughout the inner-city area, with the longest span running between Newstead and Toowong. Another popular stretch runs beneath the Kangaroo Point Cliffs between South Brisbane and Kangaroo Point. Several spans of the Riverwalk are built out over the Brisbane River. Brisbane also has over 27 km (17 mi) of bicycle pathways, mostly surrounding the Brisbane River and city centre. Other popular recreation activities include the Story Bridge adventure climb and rock climbing at the Kangaroo Point Cliffs.

=== CityCat Ferries ===
CityCat Ferries are catamarans that operate along the Brisbane River, passing the Story Bridge, Howard Smith Wharves and South Bank Parklands.

=== City tours ===
Brisbane Greeters provide free walking tours around Brisbane, aiming to provide a customised, flexible, intimate and authentic experiences through a knowledgeable and enthusiastic local volunteer.

Kangaroo Segway Tours offer tours of the city's major attractions using segways.

Brisbane By Bicycle conduct daily tours of Brisbane city and surrounding areas in small groups. The tours are fully guided by a Brisbane local with extensive knowledge of the city including local bars, restaurants, events and attractions.

=== Island & Hinterland Tours ===
Floating Images operate hot air balloon tours out of the Ipswich & Scenic Rim hinterland regions

Yura Tours operate aboriginal cultural tours on North Stradbroke Island (Minjerribah)

Tangalooma Island Resort operate whale watching tours, dolphin interactions, and adventure tours from Brisbane to Tangalooma, on Moreton Island.

== Brisbane's Food Scene ==
Brisbane is home to over 6,000 restaurants and dining establishments, with outdoor dining featuring prominently. The most popular cuisines by number of dining establishments are Japanese, Chinese, Modern Australian, Italian, American, Indian, and Vietnamese. Moreton Bay bugs, less commonly known as flathead lobsters, are an ingredient named for the Brisbane region and which feature commonly in the city's cuisine, along with macadamia nuts, also native to the region. There are many Good Food Guide-awarded restaurants, cafes and bars in the region.

Brisbane has a number of food markets to sample the local cuisine and street eats. Eat Street Markets at Hamilton and Boundary Street Markets at West End are popular weekend markets, especially with locals and offer a variety of cuisines from local restaurants and food trucks.

=== Food Tours ===
Food tours provide great insight into a city's local food scene, and Brisbane's local food culture can be experienced on a tour with Delectable Tours.

== Other attractions ==
=== Tangalooma ===
Whilst technically still within the boundaries of Brisbane City Council, Tangalooma is a resort town on the sheltered western side of Moreton Island that is a well-known tourist attraction for both day trippers & overnight visitors. in 2024 Lonely Planet listed Tangalooma as one of the 'Best 100 Beaches in the World'. Tangalooma is famous for its sustainable wild dolphin feeding program operated by the Tangalooma Eco Centre. The Tangalooma Wrecks, are a cluster of ships scuttled by the Queensland Government between 1963 and 1984 to provide safe anchorage spot for recreational boat owners on the eastern side of Moreton Bay. These wrecks provide some of the best diving and snorkeling on the east coast of Australia. Tangalooma can be accessed via a 75 minute boat ride from the Brisbane River with Tangalooma Island Resort operating 4 passenger ferries per day departing Pinkenba.

=== Lone Pine Koala Sanctuary ===
The Lone Pine Koala Sanctuary opened in 1927 and was the world's first koala sanctuary. Wildlife in the sanctuary includes koalas, kangaroos, Tasmanian devils, wombats, echidnas, various species of reptiles, as well as many types of Australian birds. The sanctuary is located in the Brisbane suburb of Fig Tree Pocket.

=== Brisbane Tramway Museum ===
Brisbane Tramway Museum is a transport museum which preserves and displays trams and trolley-buses, most of which operated in Brisbane, Queensland, Australia. The museum also has a collection of vehicles and other equipment used in maintaining Brisbane's electric street transport system which operated from 1897 to 1969. The museum is located at Ferny Grove, a north-west suburb of Brisbane.

=== Newstead House ===
Newstead House, in Newstead Park, is the oldest house in Brisbane. Built in 1846, it is now a museum and heritage listed site. It is open to the public, and concerts are sometimes held at the house and grounds.

=== Eagle Farm & Doomben Racecourses ===
Eagle Farm and Doomben Racecourses stand as iconic landmarks in Brisbane's horse racing scene. Eagle Farm, established in 1865, holds a prestigious reputation, hosting major events like the Stradbroke Handicap and showcasing its heritage-listed grandstands. Doomben, opened in the 1930s, offers a more intimate setting known for its charming fig trees and regular race meets. Both venues provide a blend of world-class racing action and diverse event spaces, attracting both racing enthusiasts and those seeking a unique day out, with racing operating most weekends.

== Day trips ==
=== Moreton Island & Tangalooma ===
Moreton Island is the world's third-largest sand island, offers a diverse landscape of towering sand dunes, clear waters, and dense national park forests. Visitors can take a ferry to the explore the resort town of Tangalooma to take part in organized tours and activities, feed wild dolphins, access the Tangalooma Wrecks (a popular snorkeling and diving site), or embark on a 4WD safari's across the island's sandy terrain. Mount Tempest, the highest coastal sand dune in the world, provides a challenging hike with rewarding panoramic views. Moreton Island is also home to a variety of wildlife, including dolphins, turtles, and dugongs. Cape Moreton Light is Queensland's oldest lighthouse at Cape Moreton, a panorama that affords a great vantage point for spotting migratory whales

=== Mt Mee ===
Mount Mee, nestled in the D'Aguilar National Park, offers misty forests that provide a refreshing contrast to the coastal heat, and its scenic lookouts offer breathtaking views of the surrounding landscapes. The area is a haven for birdwatchers and nature enthusiasts, where visitors can enjoy leisurely walks, challenging hikes. The historic Mount Mee lookout, built in the 1930s, provides a glimpse into the area's past and offers panoramic views of the Glass House Mountains and the Moreton Bay region.

=== Scenic Rim ===
The Scenic Rim, located just over an hour's drive from Brisbane, is a region renowned for its dramatic landscapes. Visitors can marvel at ancient volcanic peaks, explore hidden waterfalls, and hike through lush rainforests. The region is also dotted with charming towns and villages such as Boonah, Kalbar & Rathdowney, offering opportunities to experience local produce, art, and culture. The Scenic Rim is a haven for outdoor enthusiasts, with activities ranging from rock climbing at Frogs Buttress, mountain biking to hot air ballooning and scenic drives.

=== Stradbroke Island ===
Stradbroke Island, known locally as "Straddie," is a haven for beach lovers and outdoor enthusiasts. The island boasts pristine beaches, ideal for swimming, surfing, and fishing. Visitors can also explore the North Gorge Walk, which offers stunning coastal scenery and the chance to spot migrating whales. Straddie is also rich in Aboriginal culture, and visitors can learn about the Quandamooka people's deep connection to the land through various cultural tours and experiences.

=== The Gold Coast and Hinterland ===
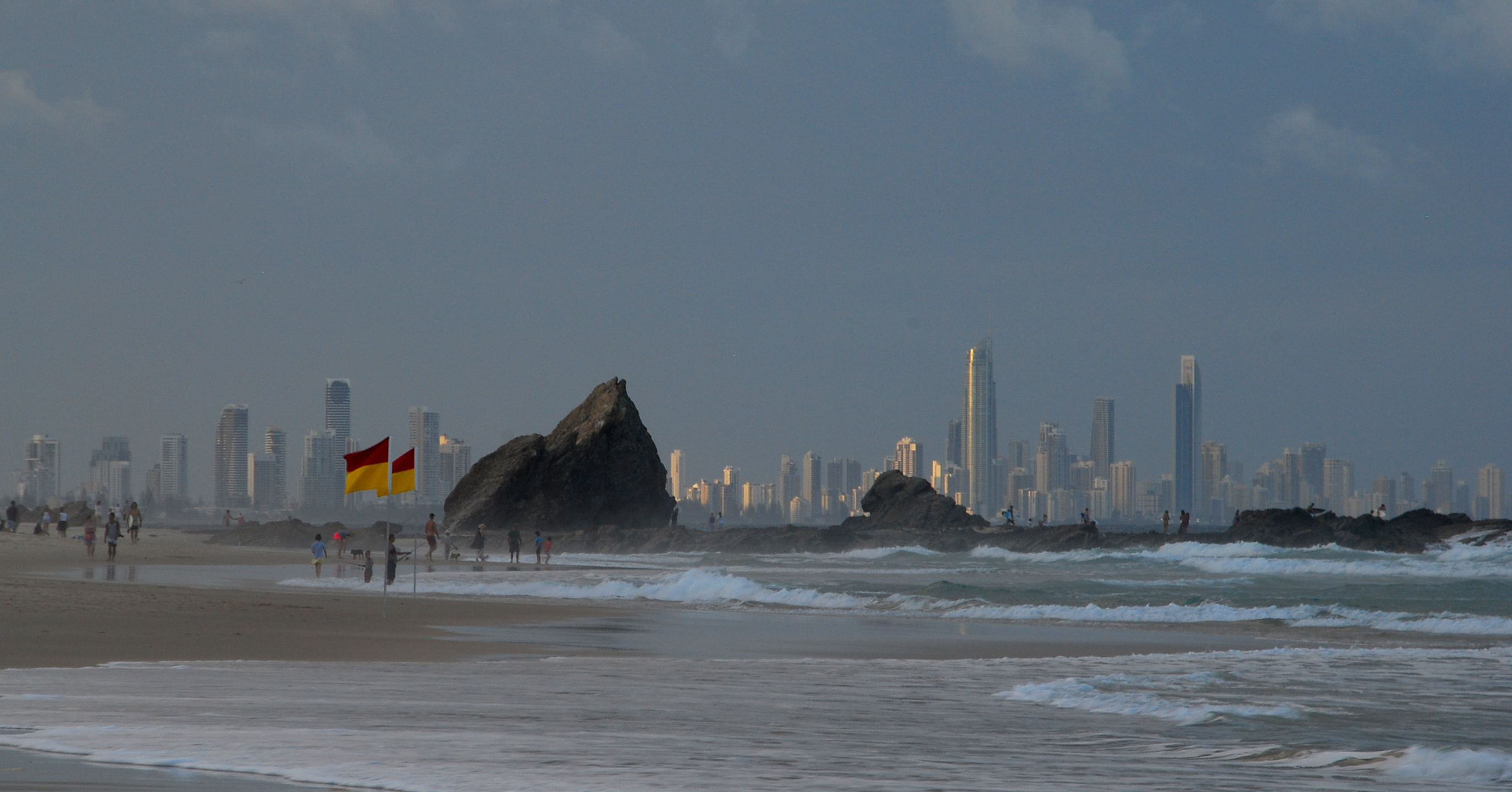
Currumbin Beach, Gold Coast

The Gold Coast is a strip of urban areas and beaches located about 78 kilometres (48 mi) south of Brisbane, about an hour's travel by car or train. Major centres with shopping, restaurants and sandy beaches include Surfers Paradise, Mermaid Beach, Burleigh Heads and Coolangatta. There are several theme parks in the region, including Movie World, Sea World, Wet'n'Wild Water World and Dreamworld, and wildlife parks such as David Fleay Wildlife Park and Currumbin Wildlife Sanctuary.

The Gold Coast hinterland features rainforests and wet sclerophyll forest with walking tracks and picnic areas. Some areas also offer camping sites, bed-and-breakfast accommodation, cafes and markets. Popular areas for tourism include Springbrook National Park, Lamington National Park and Tamborine Mountain. The Hinterland is promoted as "The Green Behind The Gold".

=== Bribie Island ===
Bribie Island is a sand island north of Brisbane, accessible by a road bridge over Pumicestone Passage. The area features a surf beach on the east side at Woorim, and quiet estuaries for boating and fishing on the west side, in the Passage. Accommodation is available in caravan parks. There are 4WD-accessible camping sites on the northern end of the island, which require permits. Attractions include the recently opened Bribie Island Seaside Museum, Passage cruises, and birdwatching at Buckley's Hole Environmental Park.

=== The Sunshine Coast and Hinterland ===
The Sunshine Coast, about an hour drive north of Brisbane, offers a wide range of beaches, national parks, theme parks and golf courses. Urban centres that cater for tourism along the coastline include Caloundra, Maroochydore, Noosa, and Coolum. To the west, the iconic Glasshouse Mountains offer scenic drives, lookouts, walking tracks and picnic areas. There is a ginger factory at Yandina, and Maleny and Montville offer art galleries, wineries, shops and cafes. The Woodford Folk Festival, an annual music festival, is held near the semi-rural town of Woodford, 72 kilometres (45 mi) north of Brisbane.

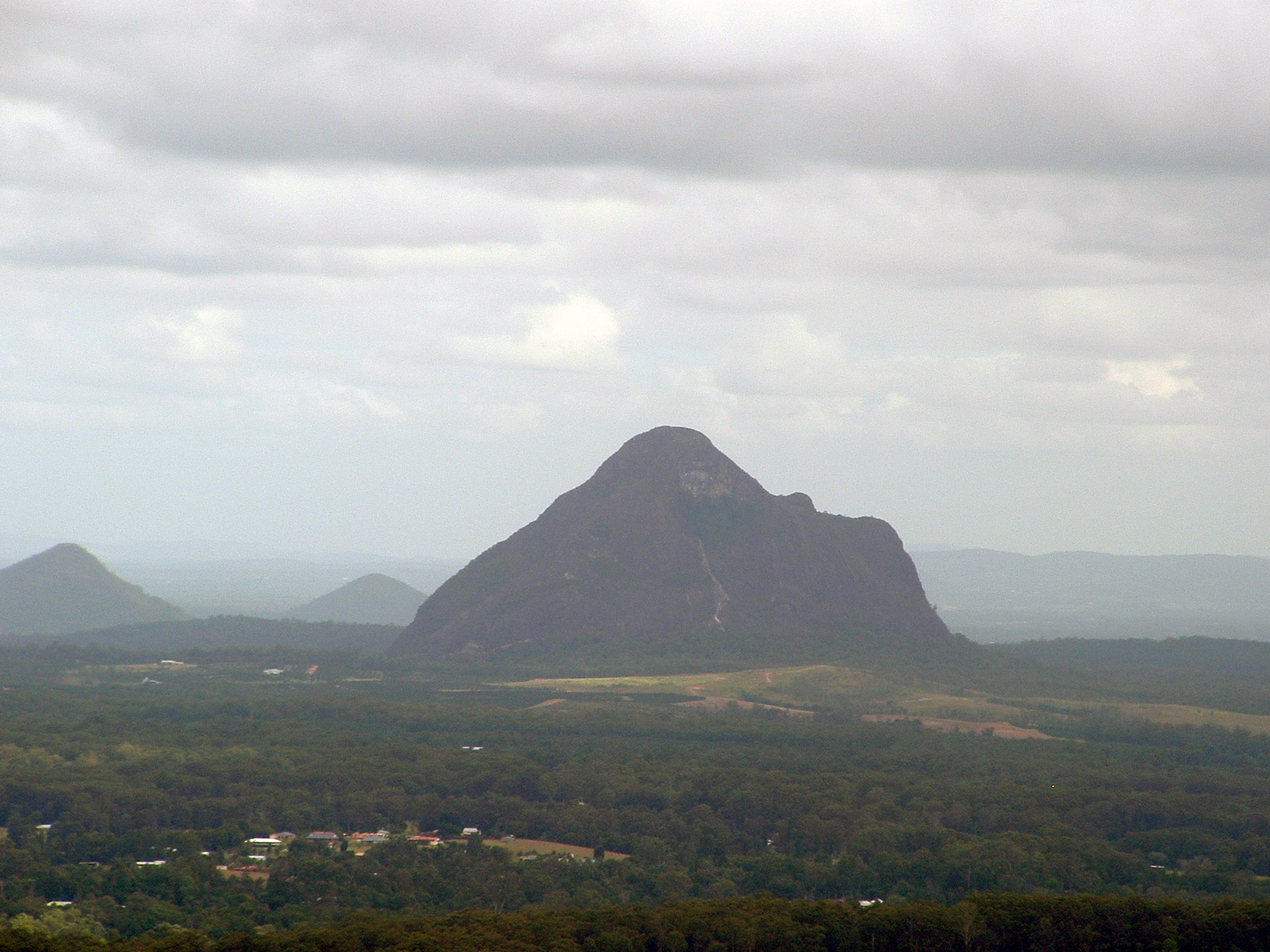
Mount Beerwah, part of the Glasshouse Mountains, viewed from Mary Cairncross Reserve

=== Rainbow Beach ===
Rainbow Beach is a coastal town in south-eastern Queensland, Australia, near Gympie, famed for its rainbow-coloured sand dunes, sand cliffs and pleasant beaches. The beach is located approximately 3.5 hours drive or 265 kilometres (165 mi) north of Brisbane, 76 kilometres (47 mi) east of Gympie and 700 metres west of Fraser Island on the Cooloola Coast.

=== Kondalilla Falls National Park ===
Named after the spectacular Kondalilla Falls, where Skene Creek drops 90m into a rainforest valley, this park is a cool mountain retreat and an important refuge for many native animals and plants. From Brisbane, the drive to the falls takes roughly 2 hours.

== See also ==
- Tourism in Australia
- Tourism in Queensland
