= SS Arcadian =

Coordinates: 36°50′N 24°50′E

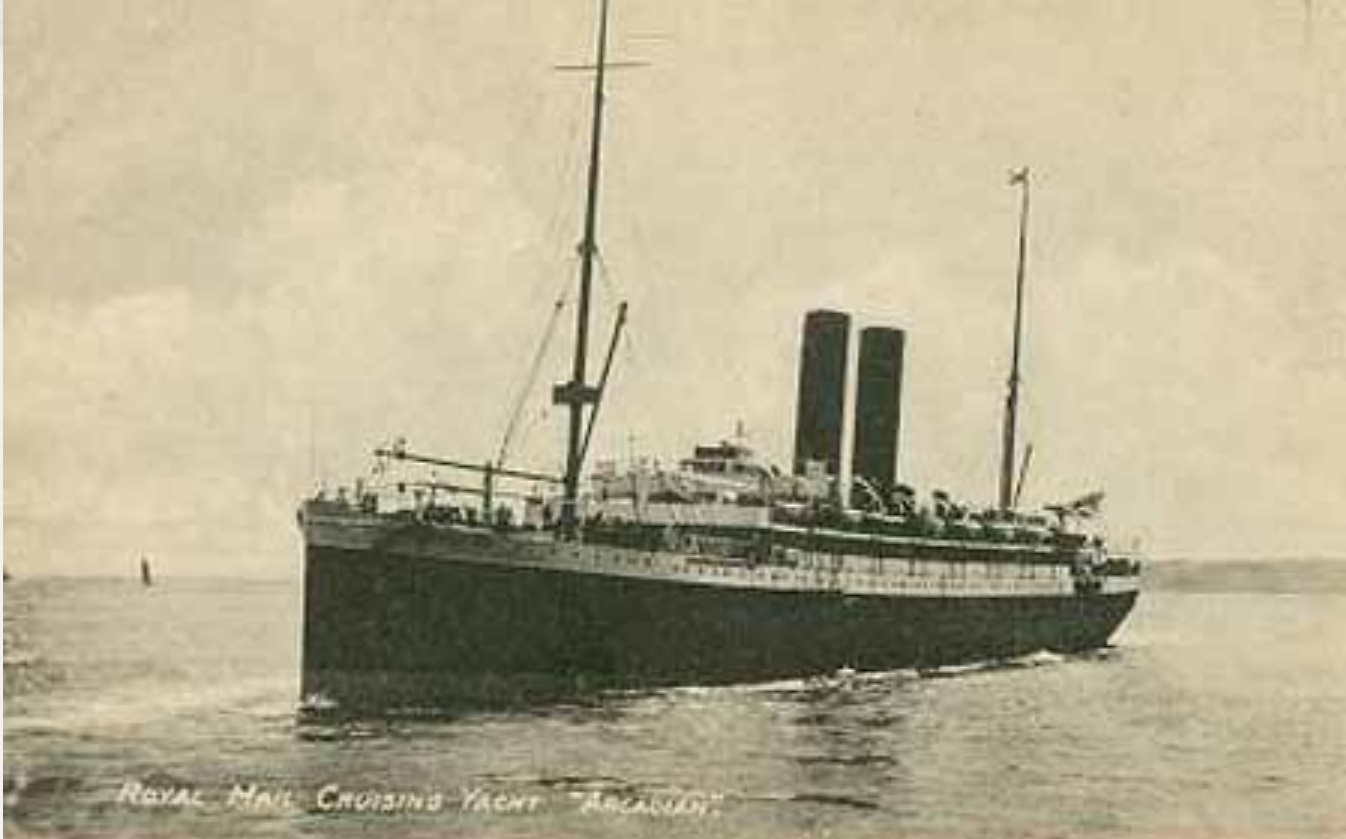
- RMS Arcadian as she appeared between 1910 and 1915

History

United Kingdom
- Name: Ortona (1899–1910); RMS Arcadian (1910–17)
- Owner: Pacific Steam Navigation Company (1899–1906); Royal Mail Steam Packet Company (1906–17)
- Port of registry: Liverpool (1899–1906); London (1906–10); Belfast (1910–17)
- Route: London – Australia (1899–1910)
- Builder: Vickers, Sons & Maxim Ltd, Barrow
- Yard number: 272
- Launched: 10 July 1899
- Completed: 26 October 1899
- Maiden voyage: 24 November 1899
- Identification: UK official number 110613; code letters RJQT; by 1914: call sign MJR
- Fate: Torpedoed 15 April 1917

General characteristics
- Tonnage: 7,945 GRT, 4,115 NRT
- Length: 500.0 ft (152.4 m)
- Beam: 55.3 ft (16.9 m)
- Draught: 33.7 ft (10.3 m)
- Installed power: 506 NHP, 10,000 ihp (7,500 kW)
- Propulsion: Triple-expansion steam engine; twin screws
- Speed: 18 knots (33 km/h)
- Capacity: 140 first class, 180 second class, 300 third class (as built)

SS Arcadian was an ocean liner launched in Barrow-in-Furness in 1899 by Vickers, Sons & Maxim Ltd for the Pacific Steam Navigation Company as Ortona. She was renamed Arcadian when the Royal Mail Steam Packet Company acquired her in 1906. She was chartered for the Royal Navy in 1915, and was sunk by a U-boat in 1917.

== Pacific Steam Navigation Company ==
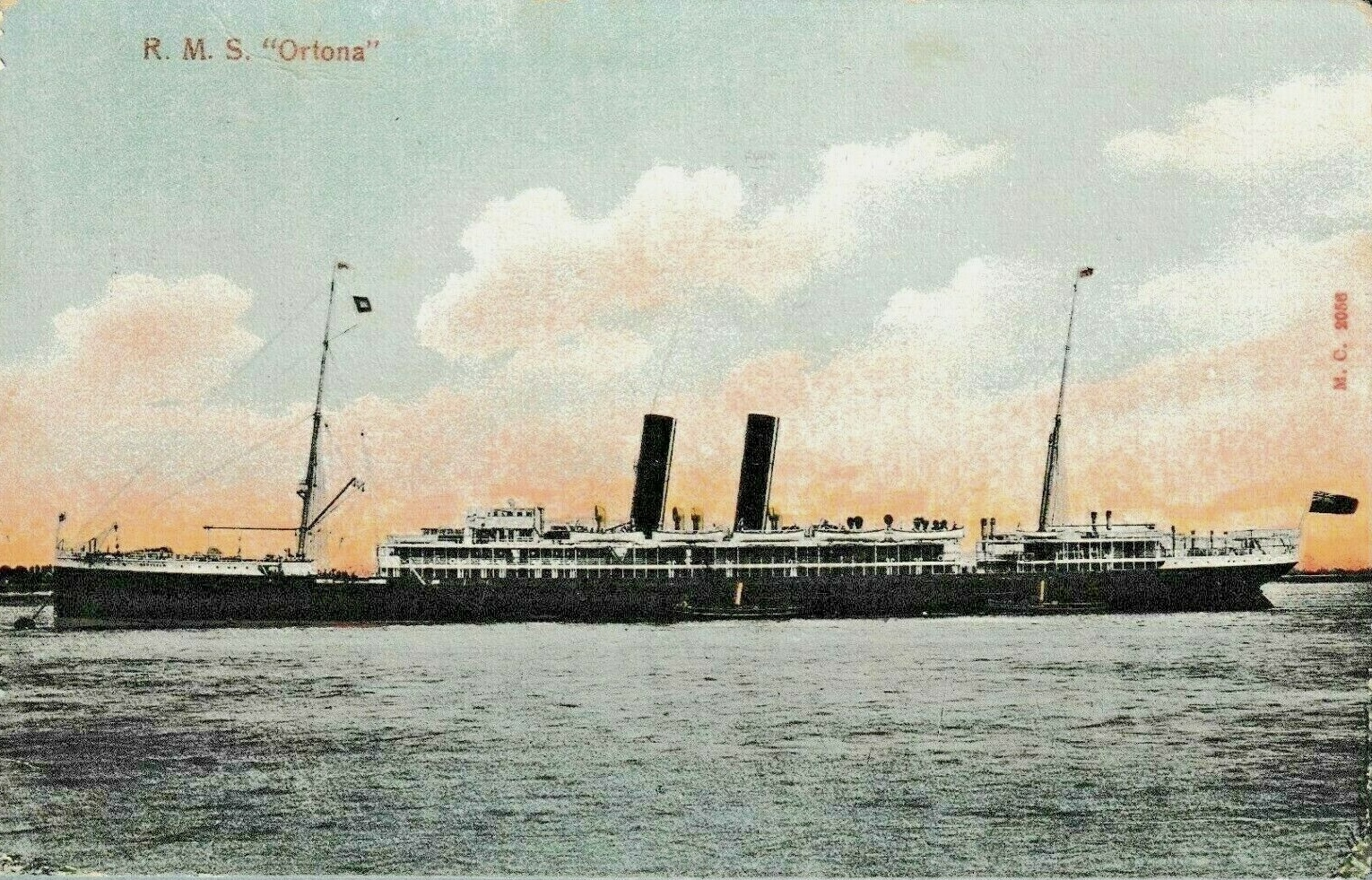
As RMS Ortona in 1906

SS Ortona was the last ship that Pacific Steam built for the London-to-Australia route. Launched on 10 July 1899 and registered in Liverpool on 26 October. She left London on her maiden voyage was on 24 November in a joint service with the Orient Steam Navigation Company. She carried 140 first-class, 180 second-class and 300 third-class passengers, a total of 620. In December 1902 Ortona was used to return troops to the UK after the end of the Second Boer War.

== Royal Mail Steam Packet Company ==
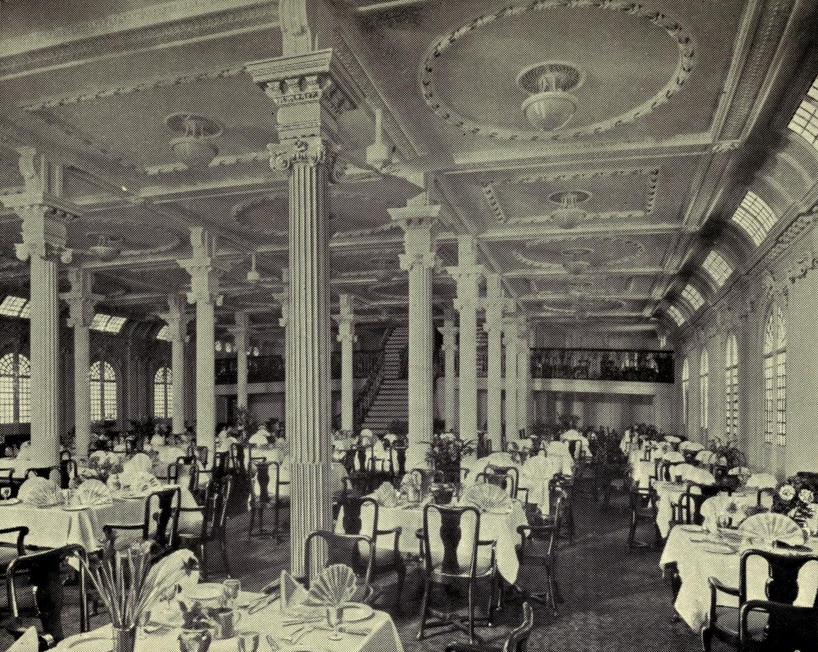
The dining saloon of Arcadian in 1913 after her conversion to a cruise ship

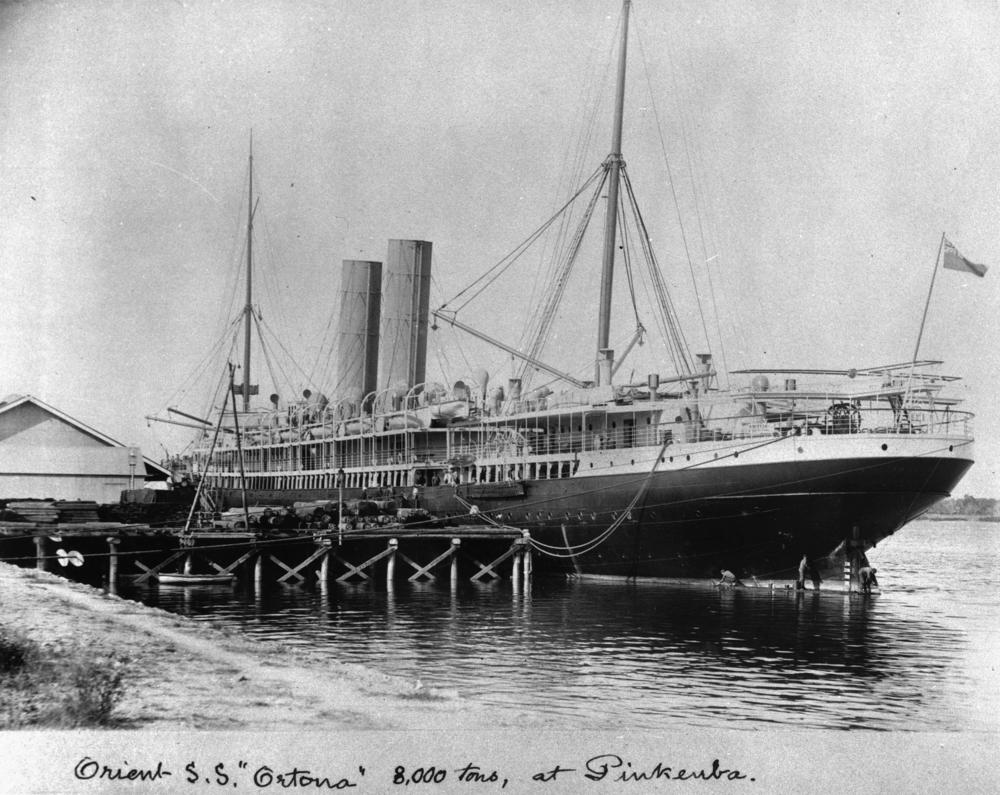
Ortona at Pinkenba Wharf, Brisbane in 1907

On 8 May 1906 Ortona was sold to the Royal Mail Steam Packet Company, who used her in a joint operation with the Orient line to Australia. The "All Golds" professional New Zealand Rugby League team, travelled on Ortona from Australia to France via Ceylon in August/September 1907. In April 1909, she was transferred to the Royal Mail West Indies service. In 1910, she was sent to the Harland & Wolff shipyard in Belfast for conversion into a 320-capacity cruise ship with a new gross tonnage of 8,939. She was renamed RMS Arcadian on 21 September 1910 as the RMSP's liners had names beginning with the letter "A", and was registered at Belfast in September of the following year. She started her first world cruise in January 1912, the largest dedicated cruise ship in the world at that time. On the first leg of this voyage Olave St Claire Soames met Lieutenant General Sir Robert Baden-Powell, the founder of the Scout Movement, leading to their marriage in October of that year.

By 1914 the Marconi Company had equipped Arcadian with wireless telegraphy. Her call sign was MJR.

== Admiralty charter and sinking ==
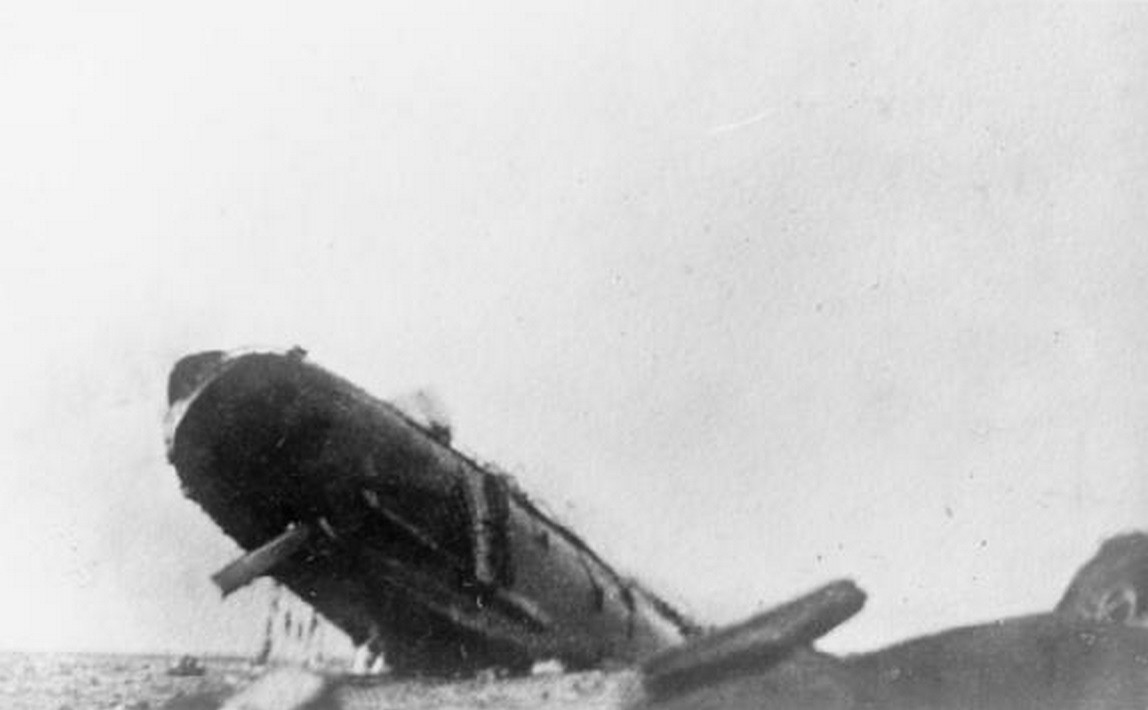
Arcadian sinking after being torpedoed. Men can be seen sliding down ropes into the sea

In February 1915 the Admiralty chartered Arcadian. On 7 April 1915 at Alexandria, General Sir Ian Hamilton came aboard and used Arcadian, together with the battleship HMS Queen Elizabeth, as his headquarters ship during the opening phase of the Gallipoli Campaign. Once Hamilton's staff had transferred to a shore base at Imbros, Arcadian was employed as a troop ship in the Mediterranean.

On 15 April 1917 Arcadian was en route from Salonika (now Thessaloniki) to Alexandria with a company of 1,335 troops and crew and escorted by an Imperial Japanese Navy destroyer. Shortly after completing a boat drill, while 26 miles north east of the Greek island of Milos, Arcadian was hit by a single torpedo from the German submarine SM UC-74 and sank within six minutes with the loss of 279 lives. A contemporary newspaper article described how four of Arcadian's overcrowded lifeboats were successfully lowered before she sank. Some of the dead were cooks and stokers who were working below decks. The escorting destroyer had two torpedoes launched at her while she was attempting to rescue men from the water; survivors reported that she had lowered three of her own boats while going "at full speed". More survivors, who had been clinging to a raft, were rescued at midnight by the Q-ship HMS Redbreast. Among the dead was the bacteriologist Sir Marc Armand Ruffer, who was returning to Alexandria after advising on the control of an epidemic among troops based at Thessaloniki.

The wreck of the Arcadian was discovered in 2024 by researcher Kostas Thoctarides and his team southeast of Sifnos, at a depth of 163 metres.
