= Portside Wharf =

Coordinates: 27°26′27.5″S 153°04′06″E

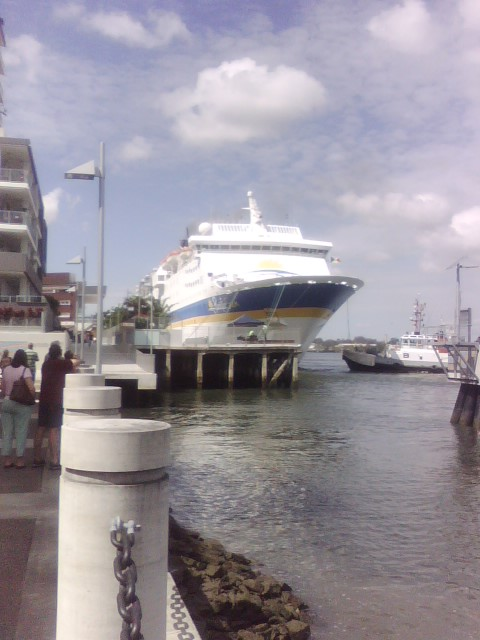
- Interactive map of Portside Wharf

Location
- Country: Australia
- Location: Hamilton, Brisbane, Queensland

Details
- Opened: 2006
- Closed: 2022
- Operated by: Brookfield
- Owned by: Brookfield
- Type of harbour: Natural/Artificial
- Size: 270 m (890 ft)
- No. of berths: 1
- No. of wharfs: 1

Statistics
- Website; Port Side Wharf Cruise Terminal

Portside Wharf is a residential and retail development located in the riverside suburb of Hamilton in the city of Brisbane, Australia. The wharf served as Brisbane's main cruise terminal from 2006 until late 2022, when it was replaced by the Brisbane International Cruise Terminal located further downstream at Pinkenba.

Portside is an upscale residential, retail and commercial precinct including restaurants, shops, a large fish shop/cafe, a supermarket, Dendy cinema complex and a public plaza. The precinct is commonly filled with tourists in addition to locals who often arrive by the CityCat ferry.

== Former Brisbane Cruise Terminal ==
The former Brisbane Cruise Terminal was opened on 29 August 2006. The $750 million development was completed by Multiplex. It was located on the north shore of the Brisbane River, upstream from the Sir Leo Hielscher Bridges (still commonly known as the Gateway Bridge). The cruise terminal was capable of accommodating ships up to 270 metres in length. Cruise ships, super yachts and expedition ships docked at its international wharf, on average, once per week.

Due to height restrictions imposed by the Gateway Bridge, several larger cruise ships which were unable to pass under the bridge would dock north of the bridge at Pinkenba Wharf or at the former multi-user terminal at the Grain Berth, located at Fisherman Island.

The wharf was the home port for the P&O cruise ship Pacific Sun which was sold and scrapped in 2017. As of March 2010, the Brisbane Cruise Terminal catered for the Pacific Dawn which had left the P&O fleet by 2020. The wharf acted as an additional hub for the cruise ship. In its first year of operation, the cruise terminal hosted 55 ships, making Brisbane the second-largest cruise port in Australia.

A draft plan to develop a new terminal at Pinkenba, called the Brisbane International Cruise Terminal, was approved by the Brisbane City Council in March 2013 and opened in 2021. It replaced Portside Wharf as Brisbane’s main cruise terminal. Portside Wharf is no longer in use as a cruise ship facility, but sees continued patronage as a residential, retail and shopping destination.

== Photo gallery ==
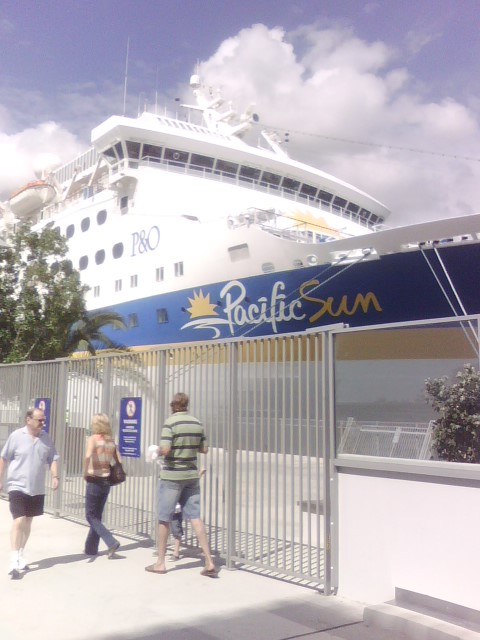
The Pacific Sun cruise ship at Portside Wharf, Brisbane

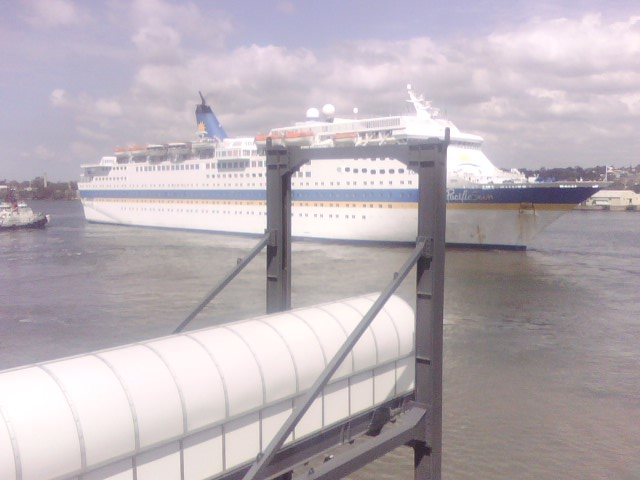

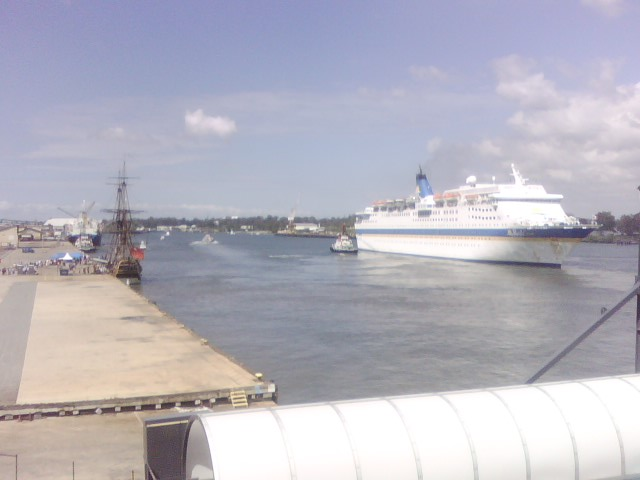
The Pacific Sun and the HM Bark Endeavour replica in port
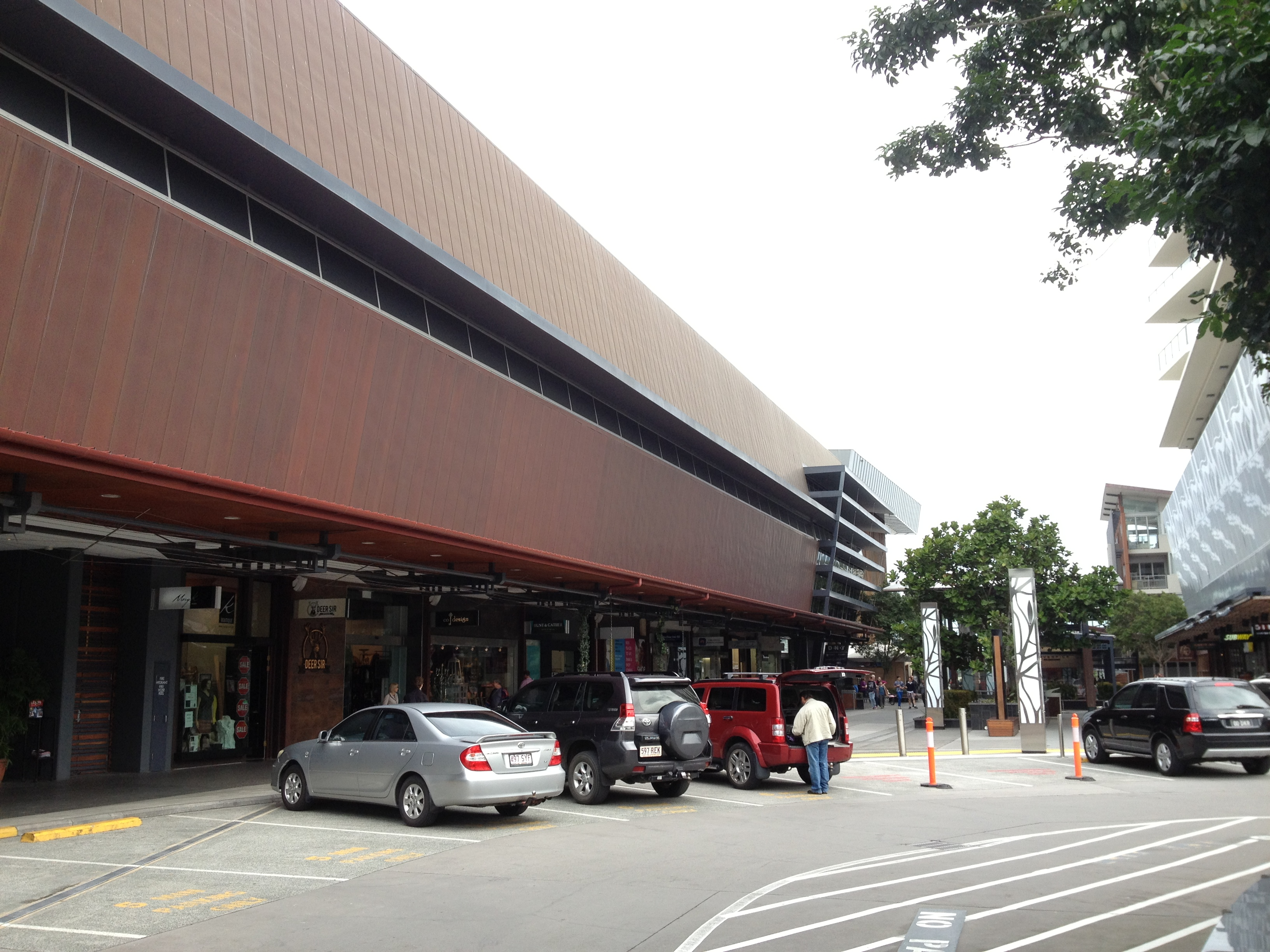
Shopping Centre at Portside Wharf

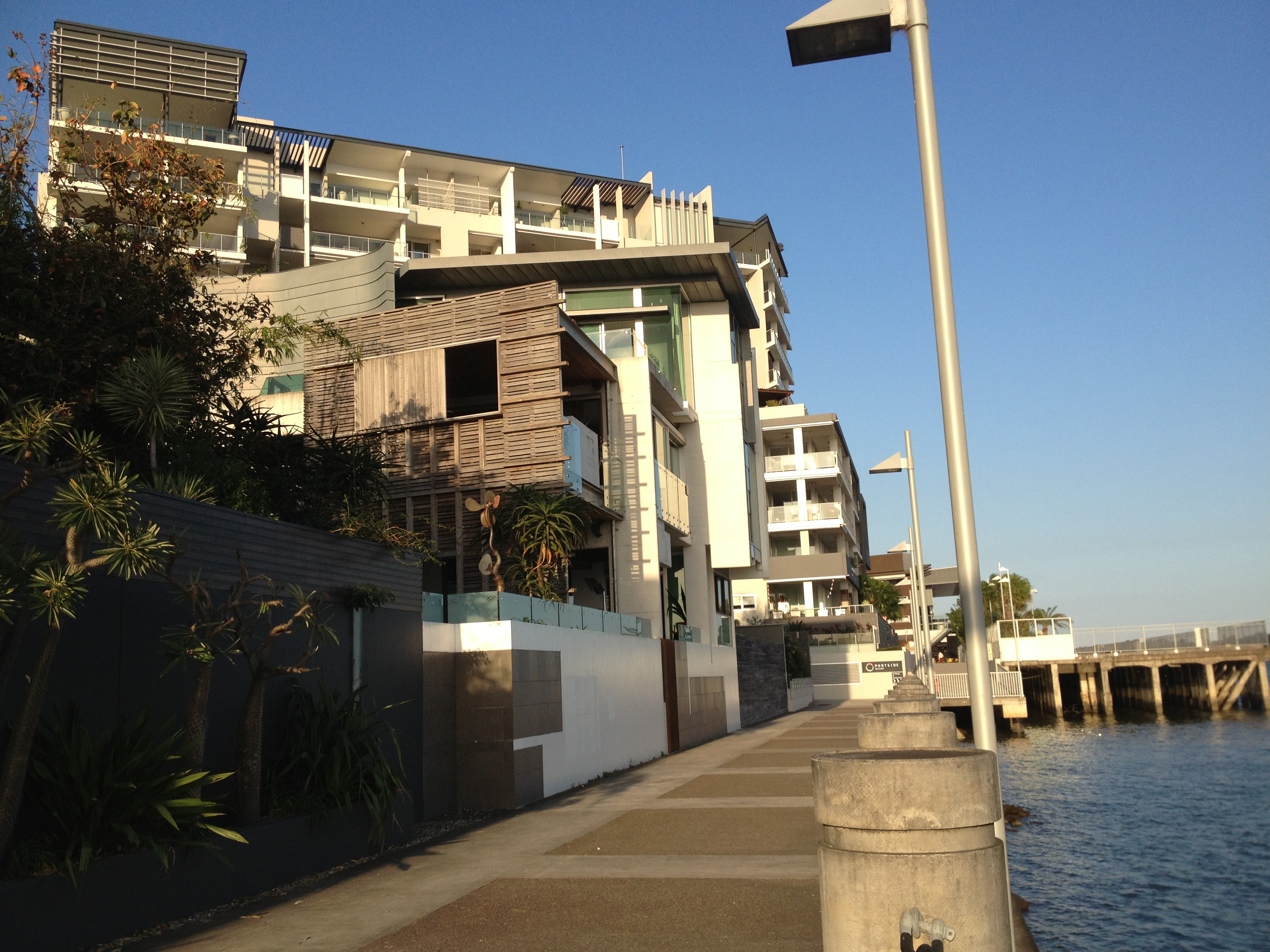
Apartment buildings at Portside Wharf
