= Gasworks (disambiguation) =

A Gasworks is an industrial plant for the production of flammable gas.

Gasworks or Gas works may also refer to:

- Gas Works Park, public park in Seattle, Washington
- Gasworks Bridge, an iron bridge across the River Thames at Oxford in England
- Gasworks Gallery, art galleries in the United Kingdom
- Gasworks Newstead, commercial development in Newstead, Brisbane, Australia
