= Cuisine of Brisbane =

Culinary traditions of Brisbane, Australia

The cuisine of Brisbane derives from mainstream Australian cuisine, as well as many cuisines of international origin, with major influences from Asian cuisine, European cuisine, and American cuisine that reflect the city's ethnic diversity, though Brisbane is represented by a wide range of other ethnic cuisines.

Brisbane's culinary scene is often described as more casual with an emphasis on outdoor dining. Café culture is prominent, with Australian-style brunch being particularly common. Roof-top bars are also an iconic establishment of the city, as well as its Street food scene with Food trucks and pop-up bars being common.

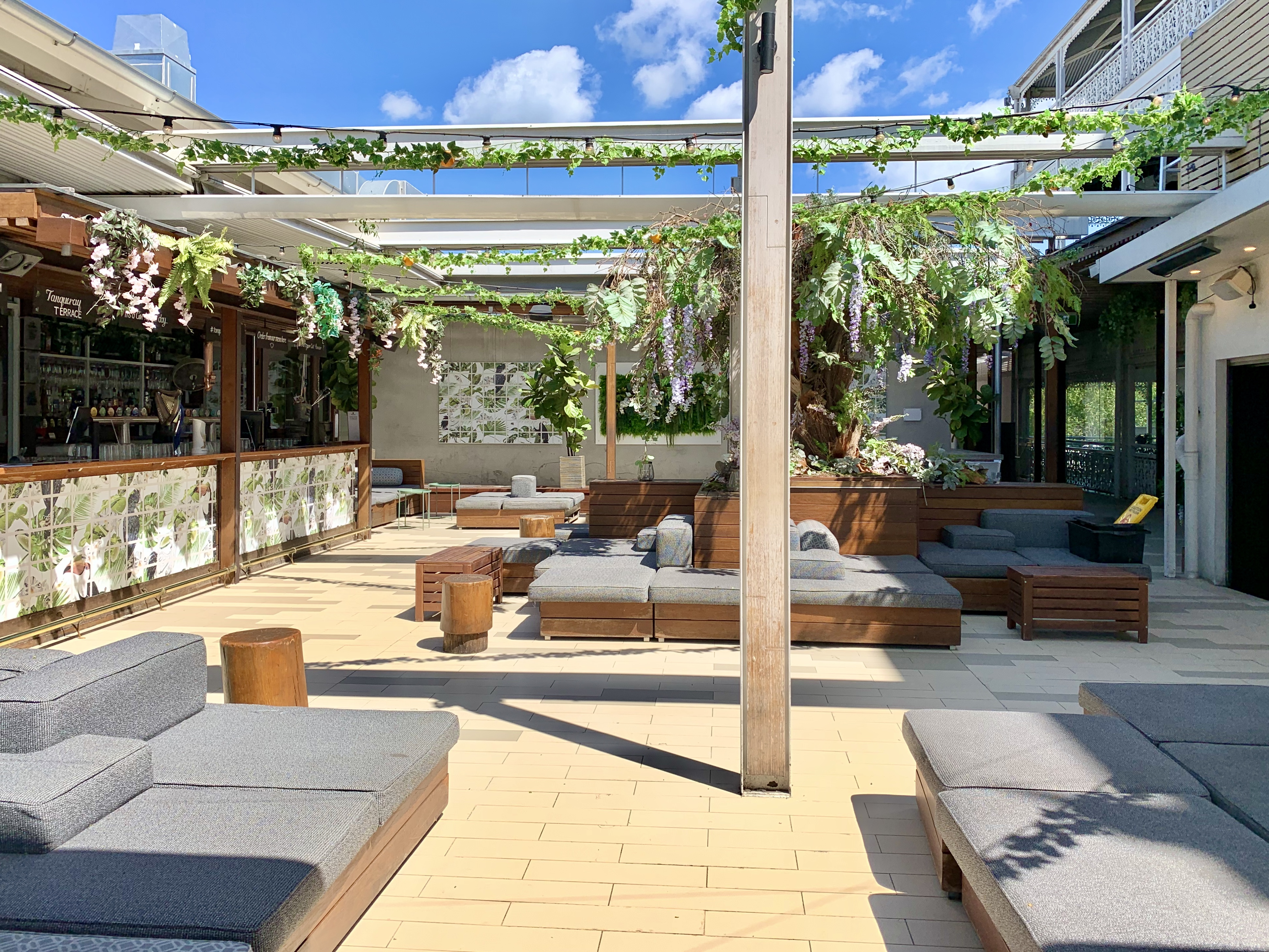
Brisbane dining is often defined by its outdoors and casual nature

Brisbane is home to over 6,000 restaurants and dining establishments, with outdoor dining featuring prominently. Moreton Bay bugs, less commonly known as flathead lobsters, are an ingredient named for the Brisbane region and which feature commonly in the city's cuisine.

== Suburbs/areas with cuisine culture ==
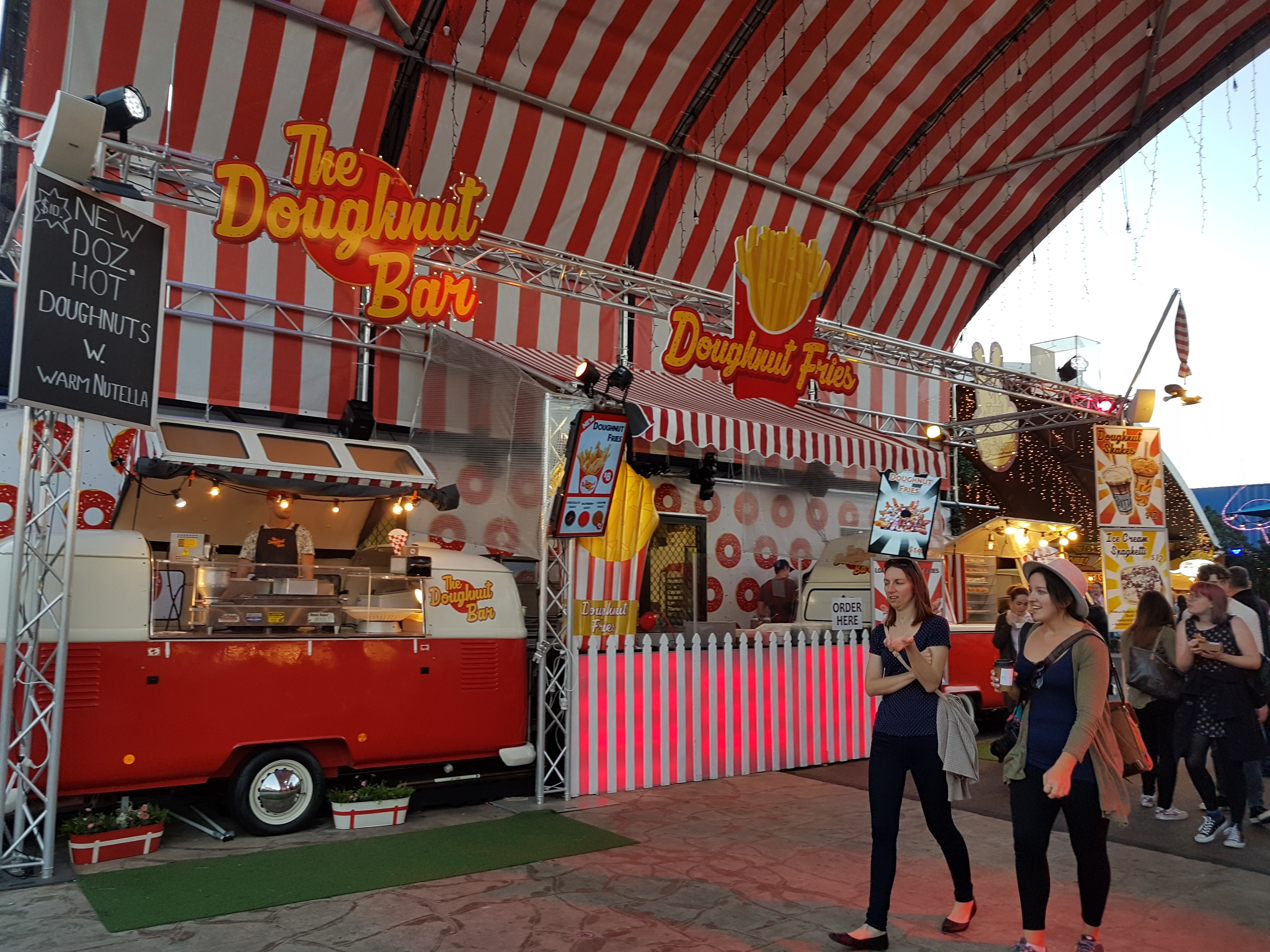
Stall vendors in Eat Street

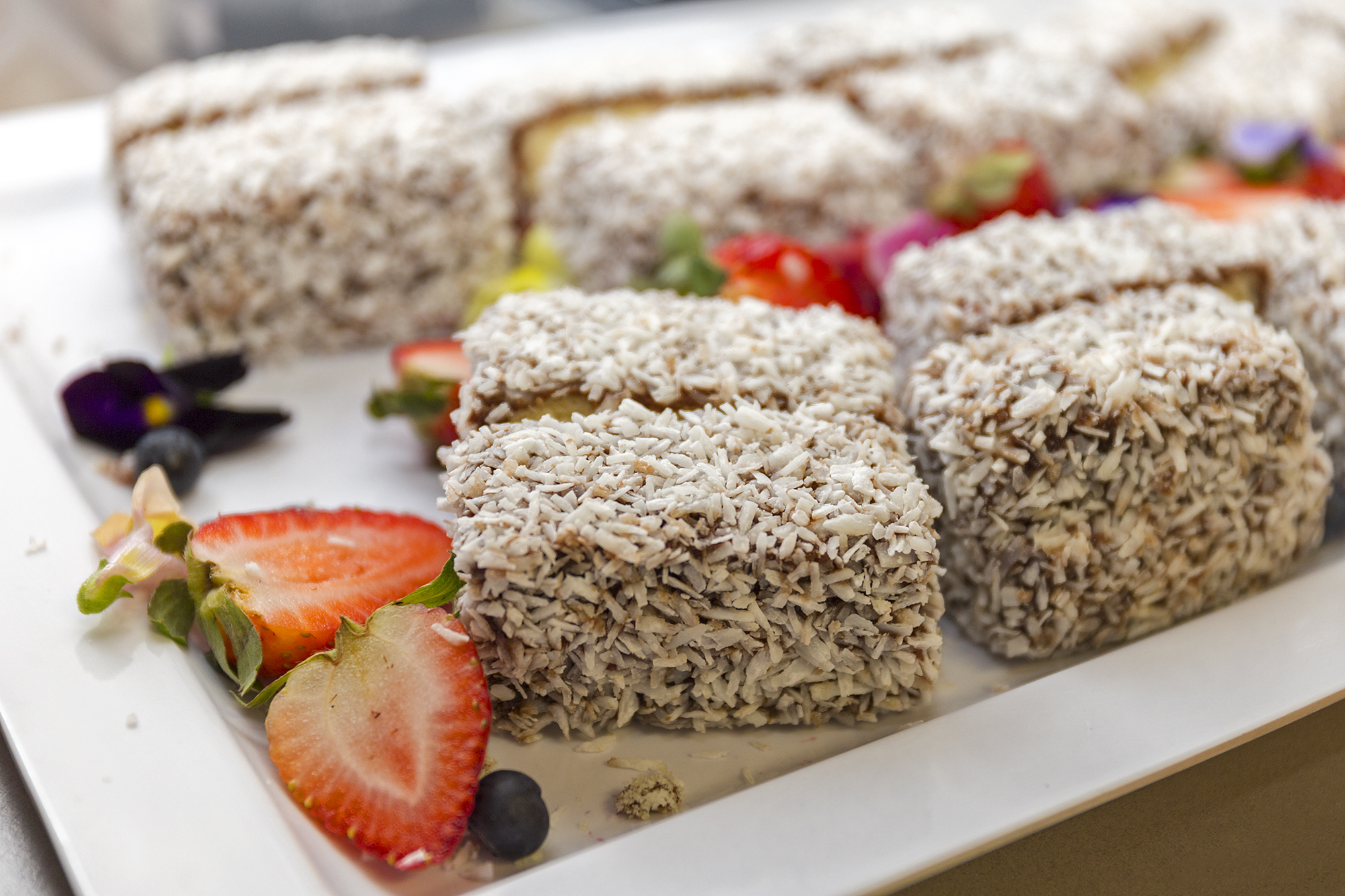
The Lamington is an iconic dish of Brisbane cuisine

- South Brisbane – American, Japanese, Italian
- West End – Greek, Italian, Chinese, Vietnamese
- Fortitude Valley – Chinese, Korean, Japanese, American
- Petrie Terrace – Caxton Street Precinct, Seafood
- New Farm, Queensland – Italian (also known as "Little Italy")
- Sunnybank – Chinese, Korean, Japanese, Vietnamese
- Sunnybank Hills – Chinese, Korean, Japanese, Vietnamese
- Teneriffe – Italian
- Bowen Hills – King Street: Mixed cuisine, French
- Newstead – Gasworks precinct, Modern Australian
- Woolloongabba – Russian
- Hamilton – Modern Australian (Racecourse Road, Eat Street Northshore)
- Moorooka – African (also known as "Little Africa")
- Paddington – Mixed, café culture
- Manly – Seafood
- Sandgate – Seafood
- Inala – Vietnamese

=== Foods native to Brisbane ===
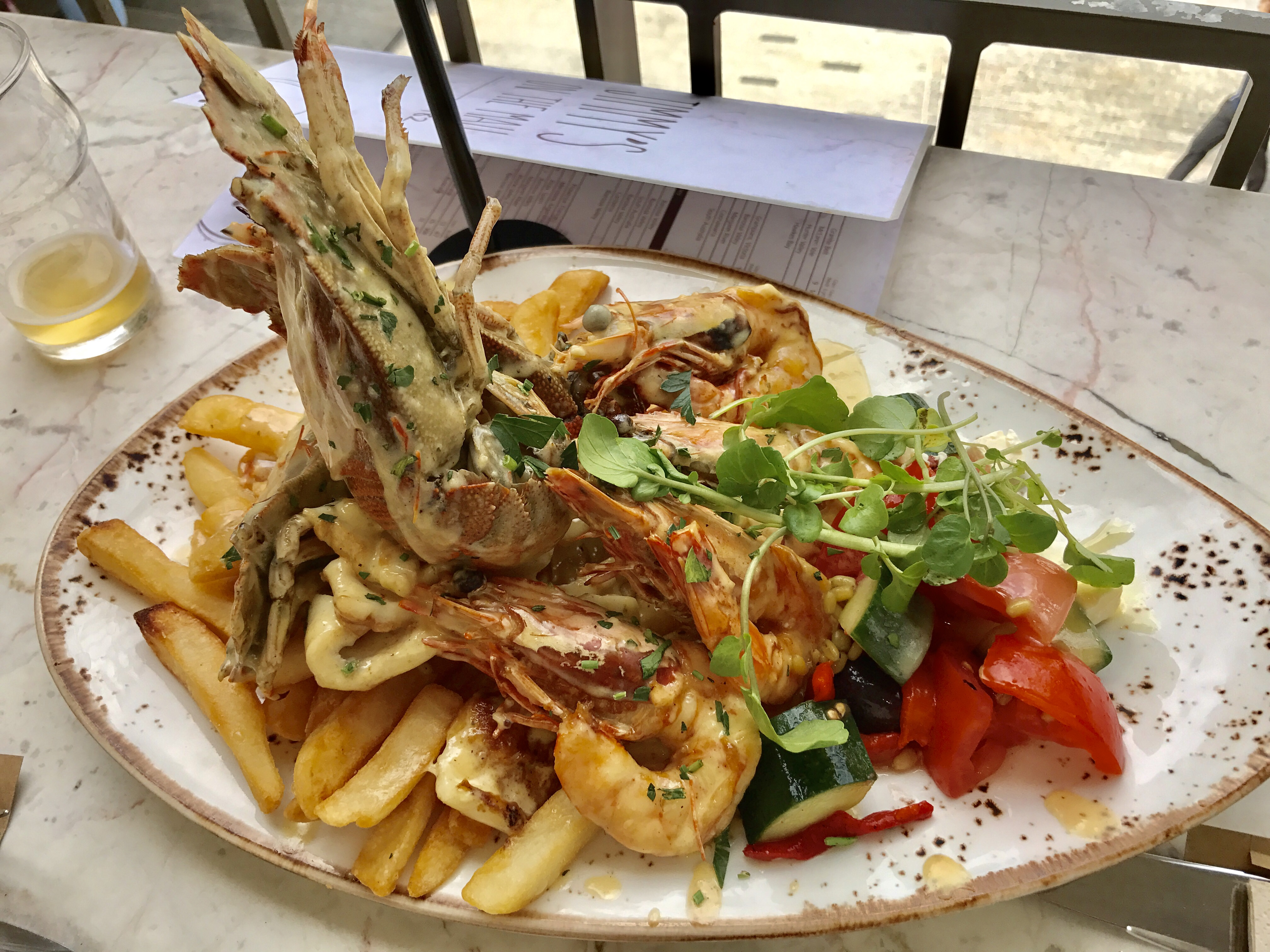
Moreton Bay bug with prawns and chips

- Macadamia
- Lemon Scented Myrtle
- Australian Finger Lime
- Bunya Nut
- Cinnamon Myrtle
- Davidson's Plum
- Riberry
- Small-Leaved Tamarind
- Midgen Berry
- Moreton Bay Bug
- Moreton Bay Rock Oyster

== Breweries ==
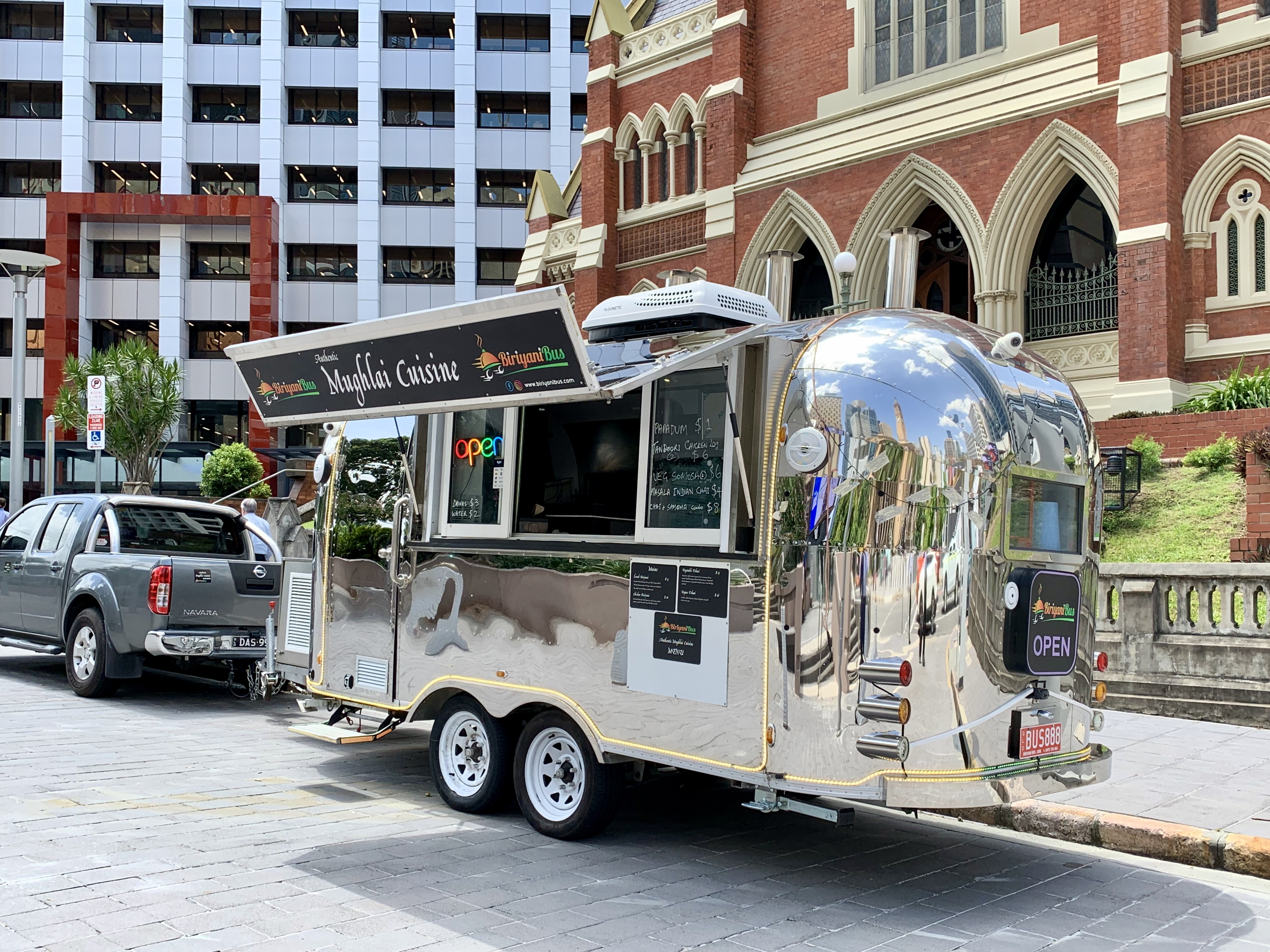
Street food truck near Albert Street Uniting Church

- Felons Brewing Co.
- Slipstream Brewing Co.
- Range Brewing
- Stone & Wood Brewing Co.
- Brisbane Brewing Co.
- Sea Legs Brewing
- Soapbox Brewing
- Helios Brewing
- Catchment Brewing Co.
- Newstead Brewing Co.
- Ballistic Beer Co.
- Aether Brewing
- All Inn Brewing
- Revel Brewing Co.
- Green Beacon Brewing Co.
- Thirsty Chiefs Brewing Company

== Food festivals in Brisbane ==
- Paniyiri Greek Festival
- Caxton Street Seafood and Wine Festival
- Le Festival
- Fish Lane Festival
- Indie Spirits Tasting
- Sweet As Dessert Festival
- Briz Chilli Festival
- Brisbane BBQ Festival
- Scenic Rim Eat Local Week
- Teneriffe Festival
- Regional Flavours
- Brisbane Times Night Noodle Markets
- Ekka
- Effervescence Champagne Festival
- Moreton Bay Food & Wine Festival
- Scandinavian Festival
- Oktoberfest Brisbane
- Good Food & Wine Show
- Straddie Oyster Festival
- Brisbane Ice Cream Festival

== See also ==
- Australian cuisine
- Modern Australian cuisine
- Culture of Brisbane
