= AMP Capital =

Large global investment manager headquartered in Sydney, Australia

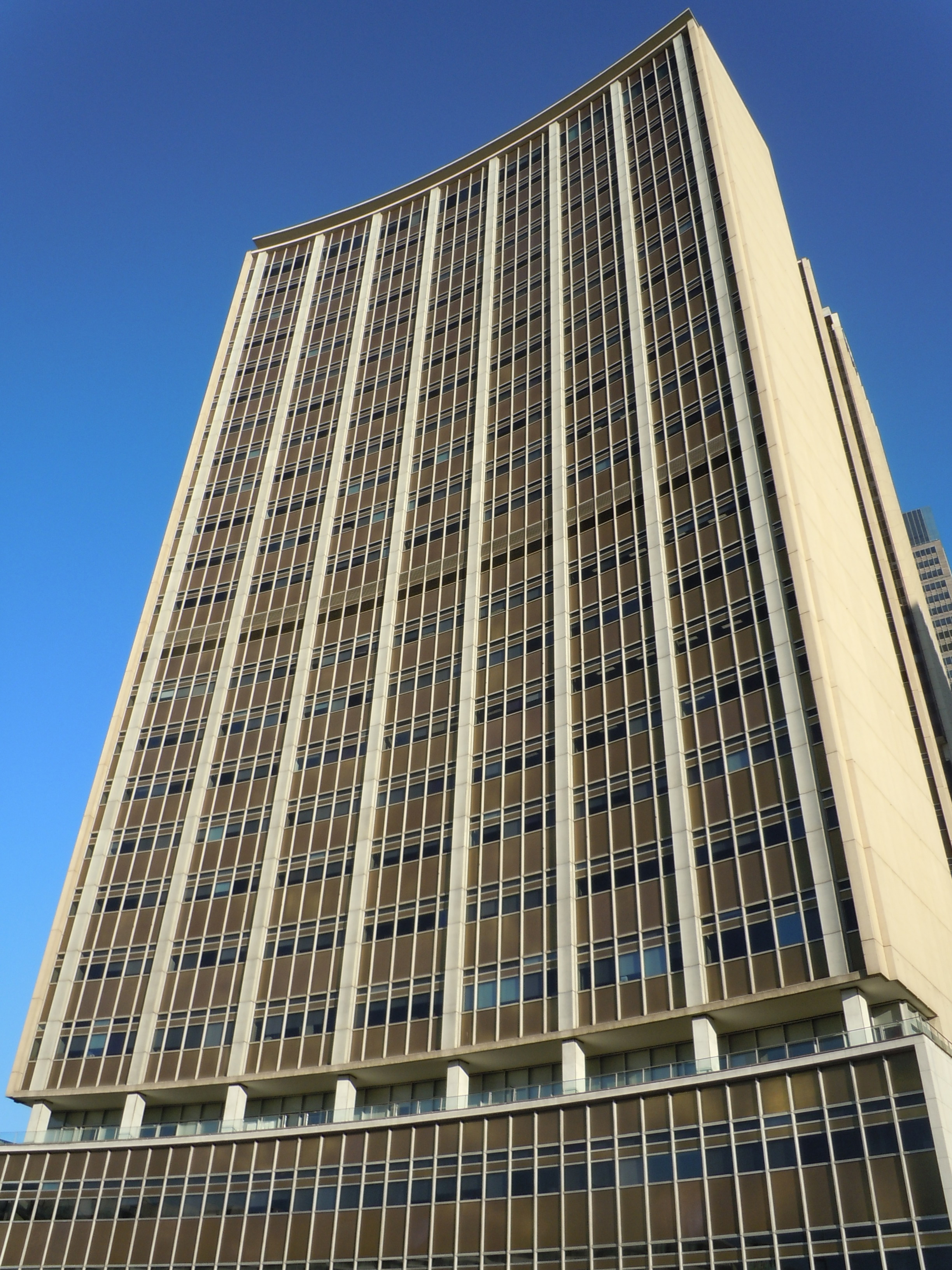
- Headquarters at AMP Building
- Industry: Investment management
- Fate: Restructure cancelled Broken up and sold to Dexus and DigitalBridge in 2022
- Headquarters: AMP Building, Sydney, Australia
- Area served: Australia; China; Hong Kong; India; Ireland; Japan; New Zealand; Singapore; United Arab Emirates; United Kingdom; United States
- Key people: Shawn Johnston (CEO)
- AUM: A$190 billion (2020)
- Number of employees: 1,300+
- Parent: AMP Limited
- Website: ampcapital.com

AMP Capital was a large global investment manager headquartered in Sydney, Australia. Its owner, AMP Group, was established in 1849, and is one of Australia's largest retail and corporate pension providers. AMP Capital has a strategic alliance with Mitsubishi UFJ Trust and Banking Corporation.

== Locations ==
In addition to its operations in Australia and New Zealand, AMP Capital had an international presence with offices in China, Dubai, Hong Kong, India, Japan, Luxembourg, Singapore, the United Kingdom and the United States.

== List of shopping centres ==
=== Australia ===
==== New South Wales ====
- Casula Mall
- Dapto Mall
- Macquarie Centre
- Marrickville Metro
- Northbridge Plaza
- Royal Randwick Shopping Centre
- Westfield Liverpool (50%)
- Westfield Warringah Mall (50%)

==== Victoria ====
- Malvern Central Shopping Centre
- Stud Park Shopping Centre
- Westfield Southland (50%)

==== Queensland ====
- Pacific Fair
- Indooroopilly Shopping Centre
- Newstead Gasworks
- Marketplace Warner
- Brickworks Centre
- Stockland Townsville (50%)

==== South Australia ====
- Westfield Tea Tree Plaza (50%)

==== Western Australia ====
- Westfield Booragoon - 50%
- Karrinyup Shopping Centre
- Ocean Keys

=== New Zealand ===
- Bayfair Shopping Centre
- Botany Town Centre
- Manukau Supa Centa
- The Palms

== History ==
On 9 December 2011, AMP announced a strategic business alliance between AMP Capital and Mitsubishi UFJ Trust and Banking Corporation (MUTB), a leading Japanese trust bank which provides services to institutions and retail clients across retail and corporate banking, trust assets, real estate and global markets. MUTB acquired a minority interest in AMP Capital. The alliance will give AMP access to 80 percent of Japan's institutional investors, around 14 percent of its retail and high net worth banking networks and 100 retail securities brokerage branches. In 2020, AMP Limited repurchased MUTB’s shareholding in AMP Capital.

AMP Capital also has a number of joint venture companies in Asia. It has a 50% stake in AIMS AMP Capital in Singapore, a joint venture REIT management company co-owned with AIMS Financial Group, as well as 15% in China Life AMP Asset Management.

In February 2021, AMP Limited entered into a non-binding Heads of Agreement to investigate the formation of a joint venture with Ares Management. After these plans were cancelled, AMP announced in April 2021 it planned to demerge the business and list it on the Australian Securities Exchange. In April 2022, AMP announced it had dropped this plan and instead sold AMP Capital's real estate and domestic infrastructure equity business to Dexus and international infrastructure equity business to DigitalBridge.

On February 2, 2023 DigitalBridge announced they had acquired AMP Capital for $316 million and renamed the unit InfraBridge.

== Accolades ==
AMP Capital was ranked among the top 10 infrastructure managers globally and was one of the largest real estate managers in Asia as well as providing commercial, industrial and retail property management services. AMP Capital was among the top 6 in Asia for private equity (funds-of-funds) as well as managing investments in fixed income and equities.
