= Dapto Mall =

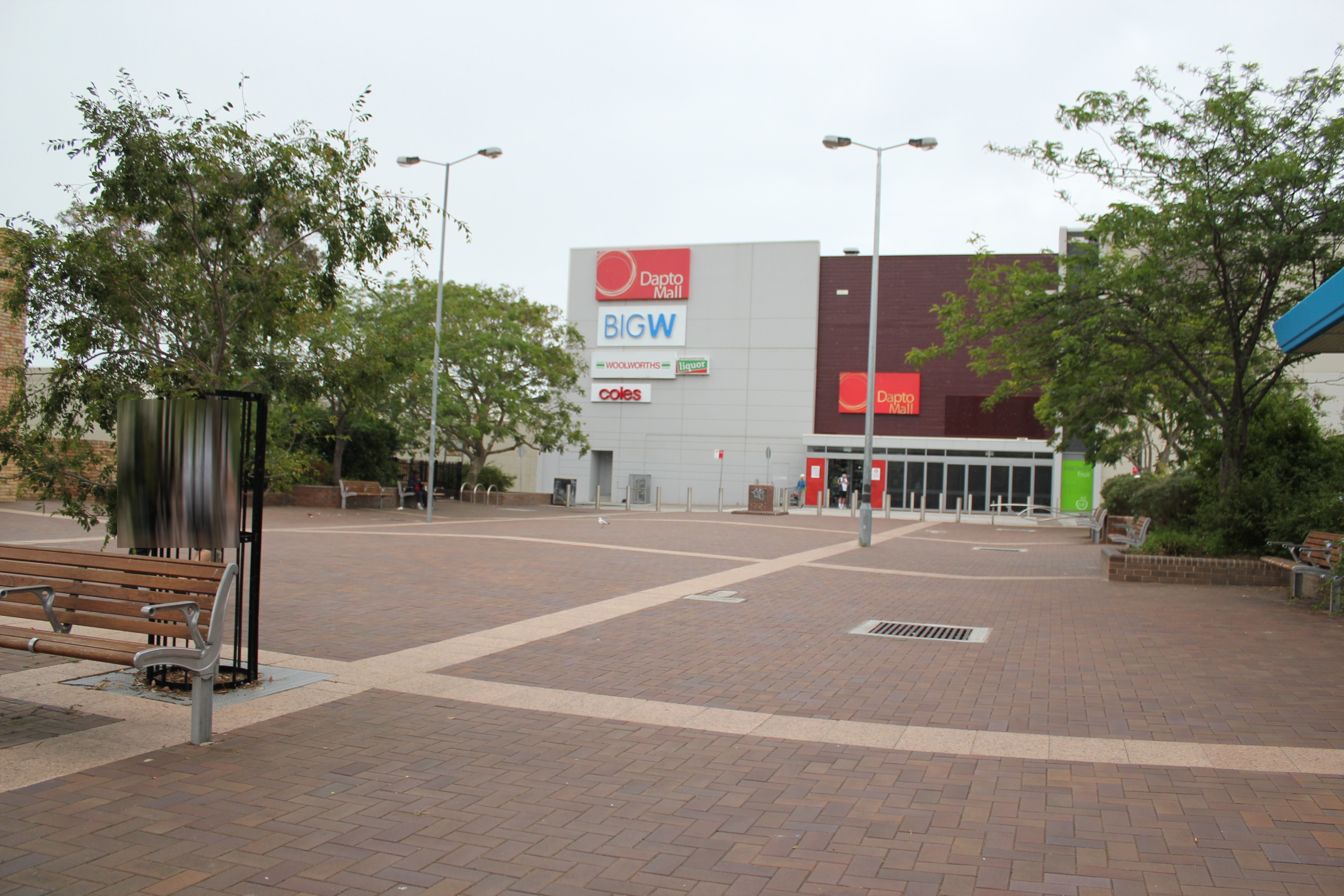
- Location: Dapto, New South Wales, Australia
- Coordinates: 34°29′41″S 150°47′43″E
- Address: Moombara Street
- Opened: 1980s
- Developer: AMP Capital
- Manager: Glenn Cochrane
- Owner: UniSuper
- Num. of stores: 66
- Num. of anchor tenants: 3
- Floor area: 21,920 square metres (235,900 sq ft)
- Floors: 2
- Parking: 1,102 (845 undercover)
- Website: www.daptomall.com.au

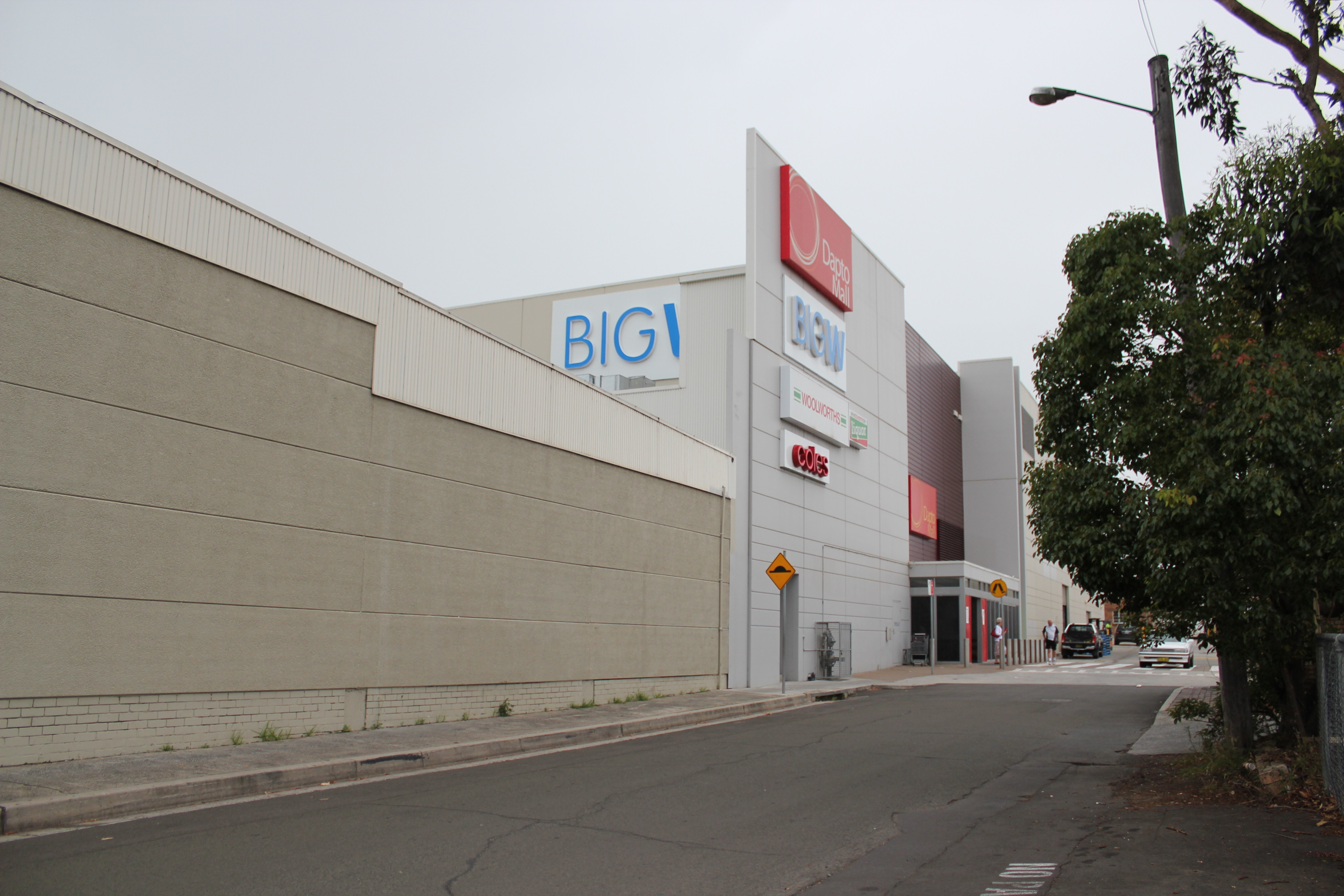
Dapto Mall alternate entrance

Dapto Mall is a shopping centre in the suburb of Dapto, a suburb of Wollongong in the Illawarra region, New South Wales, Australia.

== History ==
Dapto Mall opened in the 1980s and featured 30 stores. In 2003, the centre expanded to the old Dapto Library site.

The first stage of the $60 million redevelopment commenced in mid 2006 and took around 15 months to complete. This development saw a large car park built and opened on 12 February 2007. The first stage of the expanded centre opened on 6 September 2007 with a refurbished Woolworths supermarket, an expanded Coles supermarket, over 30 new specialty stores (including Big W) along with new customer amenities and parking spaces. It opened on 31 October 2007. The redevelopments upgraded the Mall's total retail floor space from 6,000m² to over 23,000m², making it the fourth-largest shopping centre in the Illawarra, after competitors Wollongong Central, Stockland Shellharbour and Warrawong Plaza.

On 20 March 2019, $3.5 million facelift of Dapto Mall had commenced. ‘Bringing the outdoors within’ was the design concept of this refurbishment which featured upgrades to level one. The upgrade included a new food court dining concept, a new kids play area, lush internal landscape design and a bespoke Diemme designed and constructed sculpture. The sculpture is a nod to the surrounding countryside and Illawarra coastline, the colours and décor reflect nature with greenery and natural tones. The level one entry and external ramps were also refurbished. This $4.5 million refurbishment was completed on 15 October 2019.

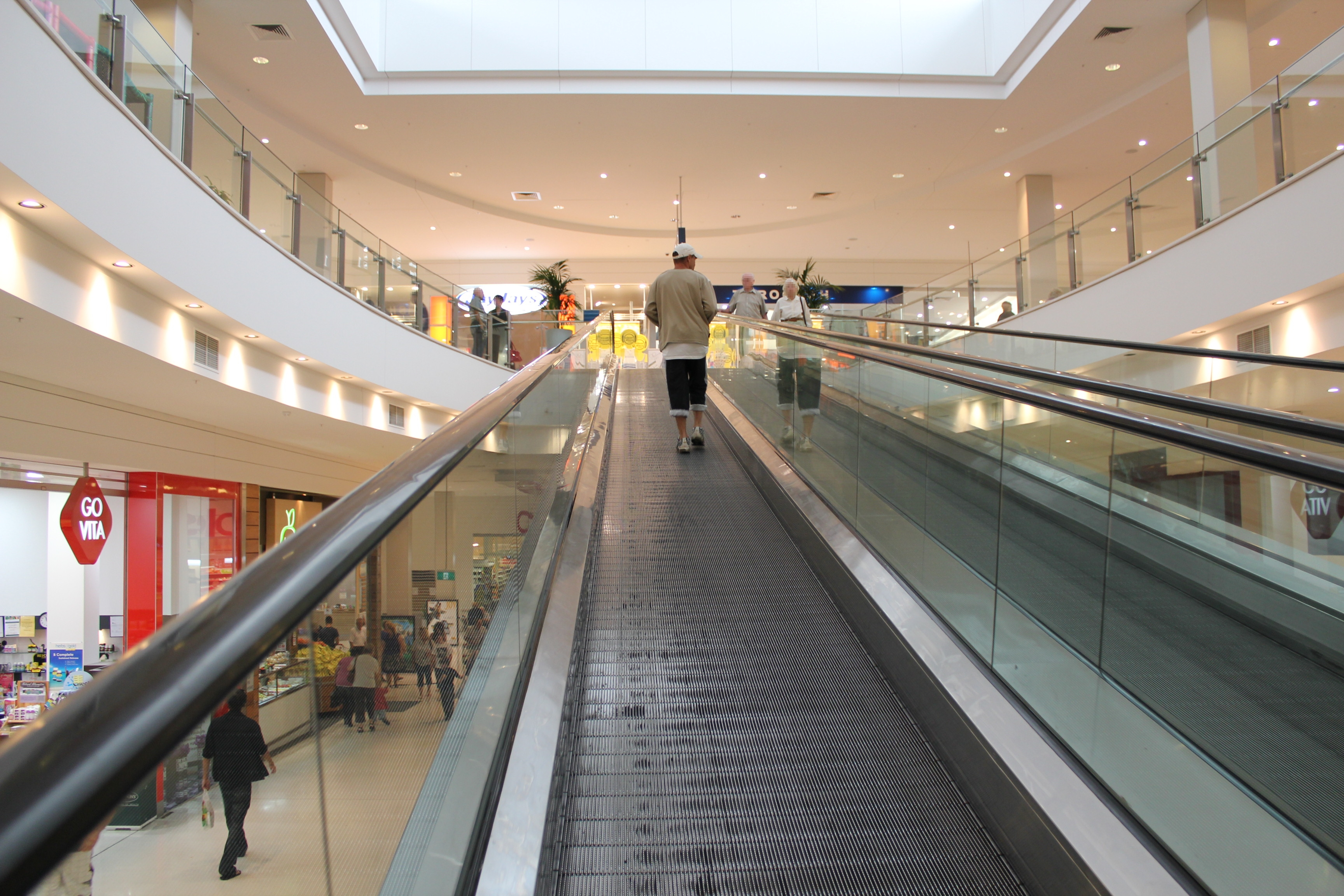
Interior of Dapto Mall

== Tenants ==
Dapto Mall has 21,920m² of floor space. The major retailers include Big W, Coles and Woolworths.
