= Indooroopilly Shopping Centre =

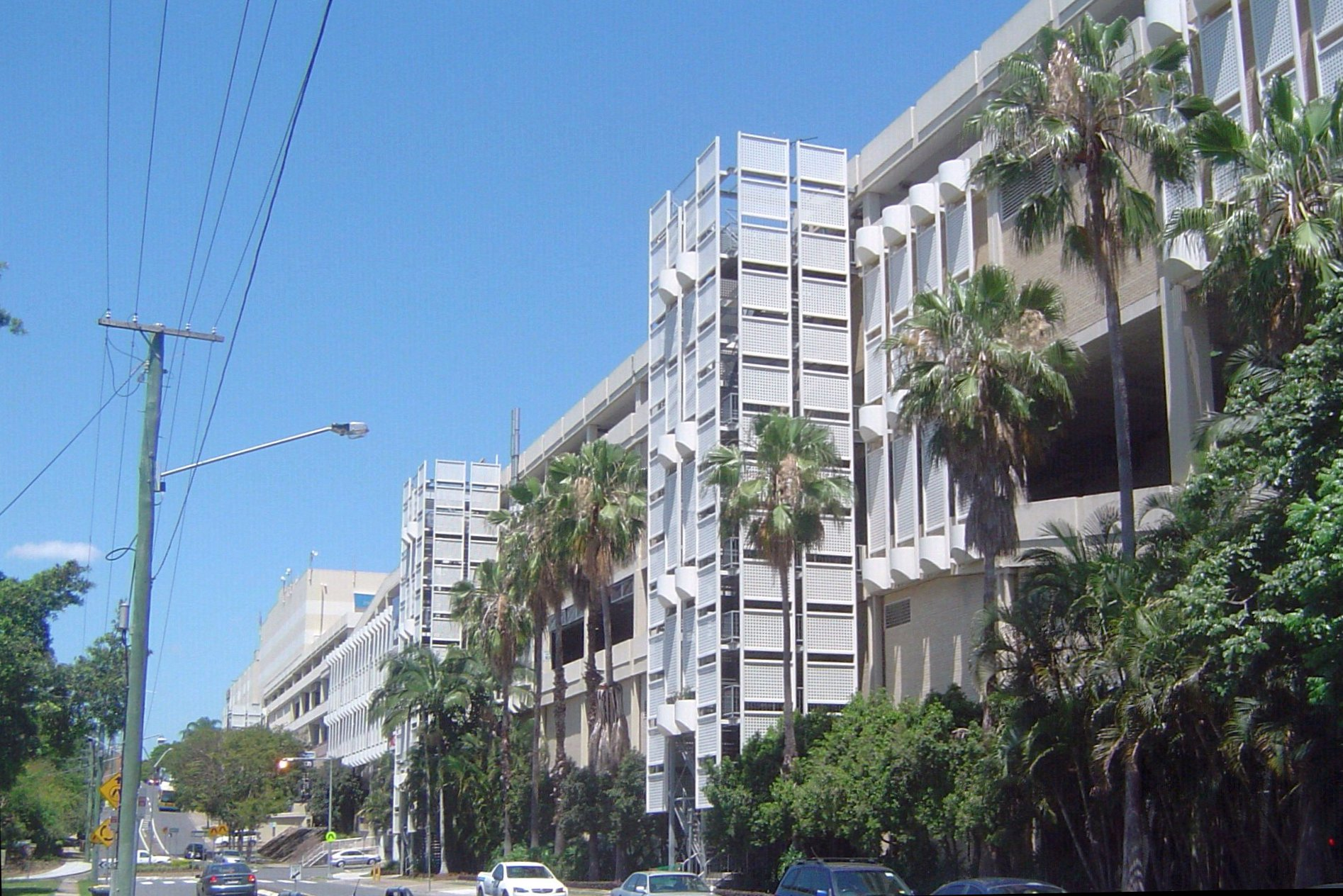
- Location: Indooroopilly, Brisbane, Australia
- Coordinates: 27°30′00″S 152°58′20″E
- Opened: 8 July 1970
- Developer: Westfield Group
- Manager: Dexus
- Owner: Dexus, Commonwealth Superannuation Corporation
- Num. of stores: 300
- Num. of anchor tenants: 10
- Floor area: Approx 117,500 m^{2} (1,265,000 sq ft)
- Floors: 4
- Parking: 4,700 spaces
- Website: indooroopillyshopping.com.au

Indooroopilly Shopping Centre, formerly Indooroopilly Shoppingtown, is a major regional shopping centre in the western suburb of Indooroopilly in the City of Brisbane, Queensland, Australia. It hosts over 260 specialty stores over 4 floors and is the largest shopping centre in the western suburbs of Brisbane, by gross lettable area, and contains the only Myer and David Jones store in that region.

== History ==
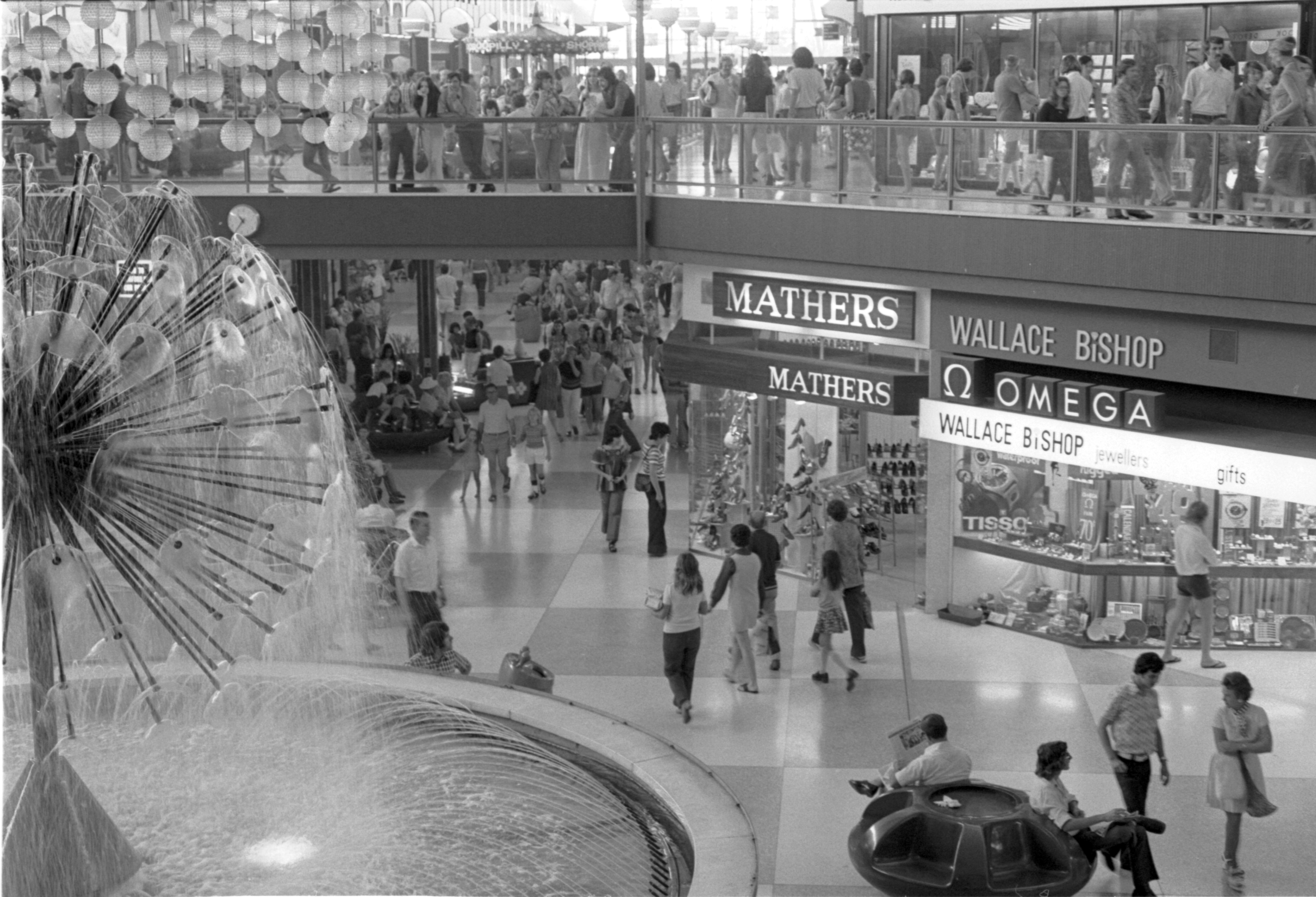
Indooroopilly Shoppingtown, circa 1976. The fountain was near the entrance to the Myer store.

The centre was constructed and opened in 1970 by the Westfield Group. The entire area was first cleared of the residents and their homes, mostly Queenslander-style houses. At its opening, it was reputedly the largest shopping mall in the Southern Hemisphere. This title has since been overtaken by newer centres such as the Chadstone Shopping Centre in Melbourne.

The centre has undergone extensive renovations since its opening. Some of these include a 12 screen cinema complex operated by Birch Carroll & Coyle Megaplex in 1998. Until 2000, Indooroopilly Shopping Centre was known as Westfield Shoppingtown Indooroopilly.

In 2000, the Westfield Group sold its 50% joint venture stake in the centre to Commonwealth Funds Management (CFM) for $300 million. CFM, through its management of the Commonwealth Property Fund (CPF), was the other partner in the joint venture, owning the other 50% stake and giving them full ownership of the centre as a result of the sale. In 2005, CPF (while managed by Colonial First State Property) sold 50% of the centre to the Public Sector and Commonwealth Superannuation Schemes (PSS/CSS) and local business owner Michael Schirripa.

A$300 million redevelopment was completed in 2014 including a new parallel mall, a new department store, an additional 30,000 square metres (320,000 sq ft) of retail space and 900 additional carparks.

The centre introduced an advanced parking system in September 2015. The new parking system (the first in a Queensland shopping centre) is ticketless relying on license plate recognition. As a part of the controlled parking initiative, a parking guidance system has been introduced using LED-based space indicators and electronic display boards to advise customers of available car parking spaces. In November 2017, AMP Capital purchased a 50% shareholding.

== Retailers ==
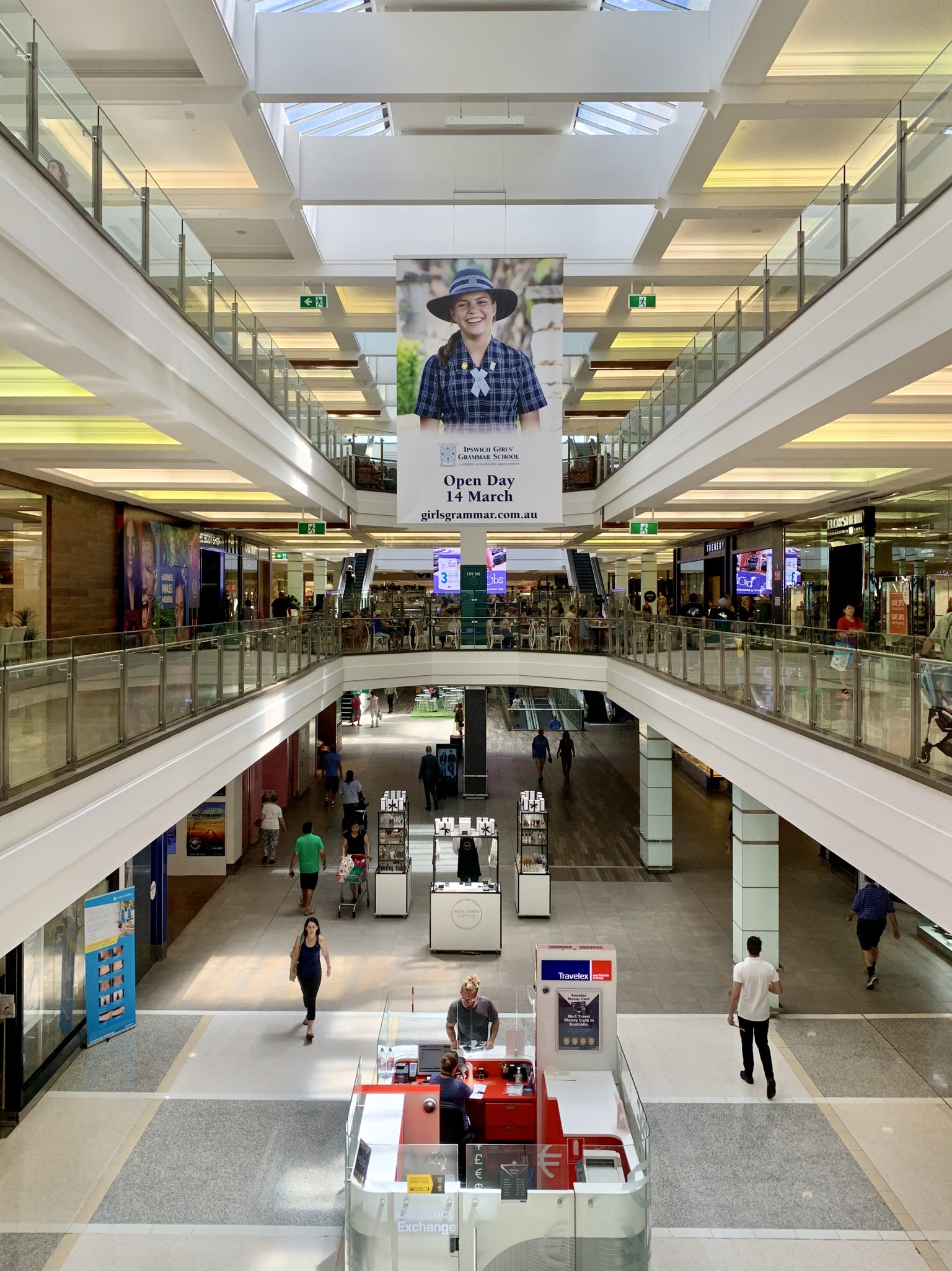
Atrium

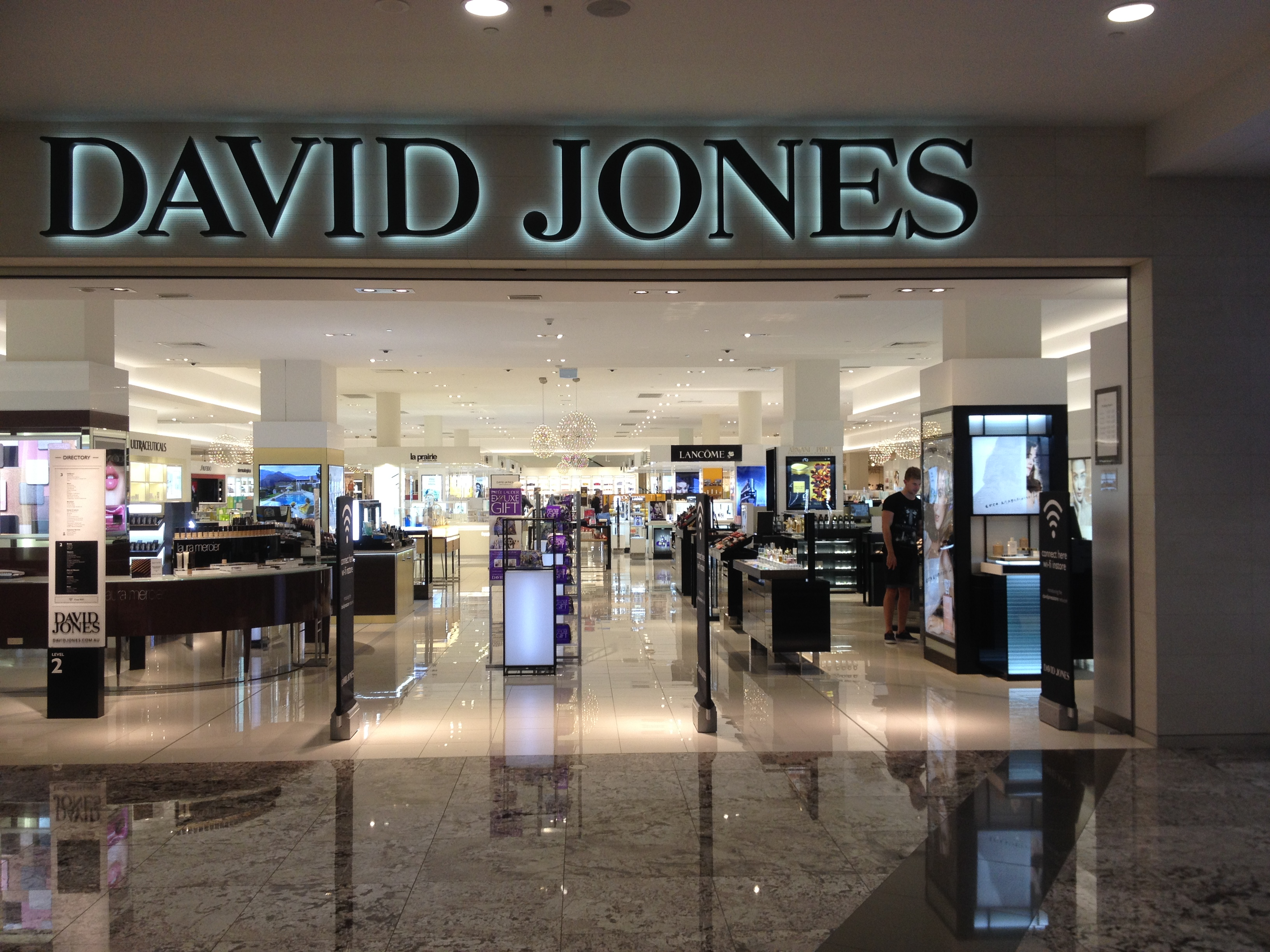
David Jones

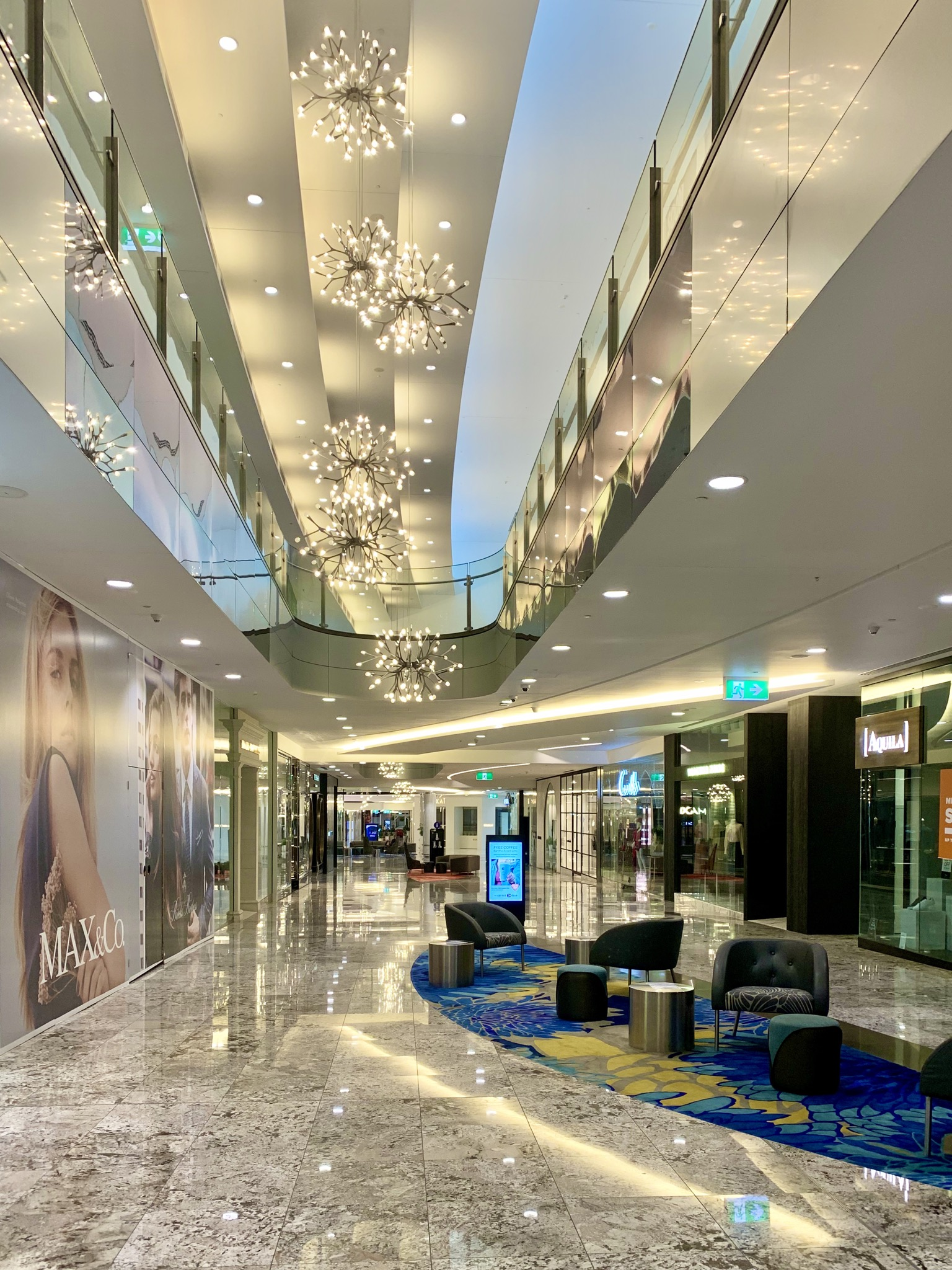
Indooroopilly Shopping Centre during the COVID-19 pandemic

Indooroopilly Shopping Centre is home to a large number of retail shops and hosts many fashion stores. Majors include Myer, David Jones, Target, Kmart, Coles, Woolworths, Aldi, Rebel, JB Hi-Fi, H&M, Uniqlo, Sephora, Cotton On Mega and Daiso. Indooroopilly Shopping Centre has a 16 screen Event Cinemas and large food court at the southern end of the 3rd level, which includes a McDonald's and a KFC.

== Transport ==
The shopping centre is serviced by public and private transport. Indooroopilly Shopping Centre contains a bus interchange that acts as a hub for bus services in the western suburbs. Indooroopilly railway station is located 400m downhill from the shopping centre. The centre's car parking can be accessed from all sides of the shopping centre. Bicycle racks are provided around the entrances to the shopping centre. The centre's pedestrian access is via 3 direct entrances are located on the building's ends; all other entrances are via the car parks. There is an EV charging station in the centre.

== Other facilities ==
The centre is home to the Indooroopilly branch of the Brisbane City Council Library and contains an Australia Post office.

== See also ==
- List of shopping centres in Australia
