= The Palms Shopping Centre =

Shopping mall in Christchurch, New Zealand

- Location: Shirley; Christchurch; New Zealand
- Coordinates: 43°30′24.14″S 172°39′47.49″E
- Address: Cnr Marshland Road & New Brighton Road, Shirley, Christchurch
- Opened: 1997
- Owner: DiMauro Group
- Num. of stores: 95
- Num. of anchor tenants: 4 (Countdown, Farmers, Reading Cinema, Chemist Warehouse)
- Floor area: 35,343 m² (380,429 ft²)
- Floors: 2
- Parking: 1450 (810 lighted lot, 640 multi-storey car park)
- Website: thepalms.co.nz

The Palms Shopping Centre is a shopping mall located in the suburb of Shirley, Christchurch, situated 4 kilometres (2.5 mi) from the city's CBD. The anchor by Woolworths, Farmers, Reading Cinema, and Chemist Warehouse. Kmart closed its doors at said mall after 23 years.

== Description ==
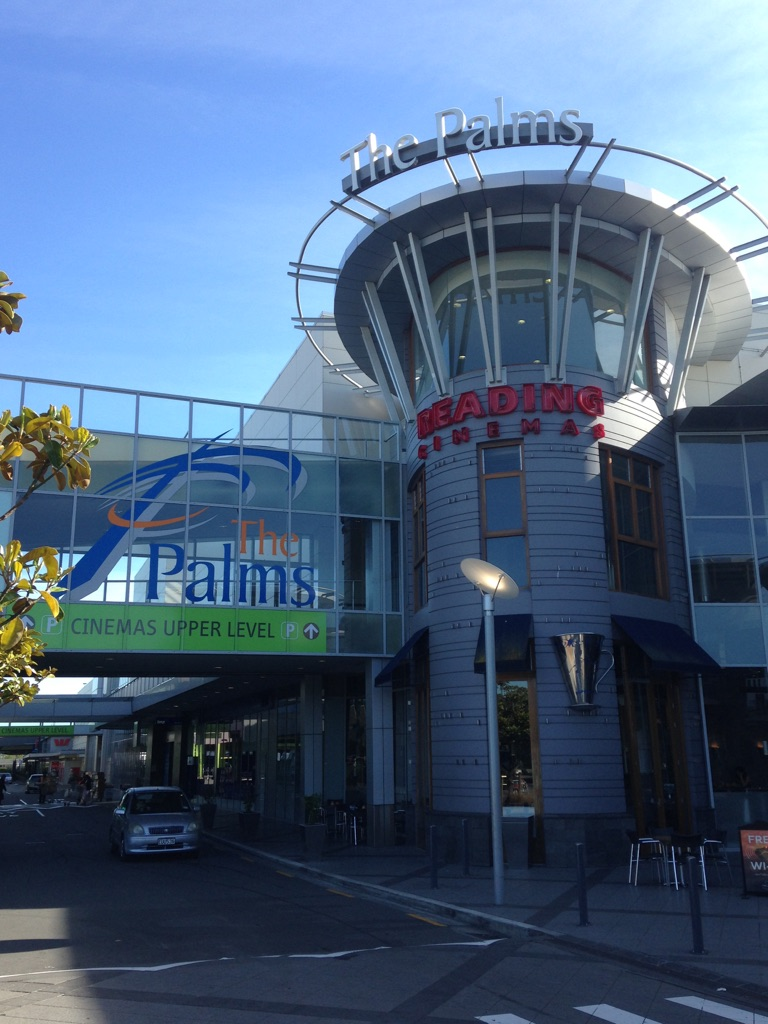
The Palms Shopping Centre in Shirley, arena area featuring Reading Cinemas and a range of restaurants and bars

The mall consists of 82 retailers, including Countdown, Farmers and the first Reading Cinemas multiplex in Christchurch. In 2003, a $50 million NZD upgrade was completed, nearly doubling the size to 35,343 m^{2} (380,429 ft^{2}) . The entry plaza of the mall won an NZILA Silver award for landscape design in 2004.

Australian based AMP Capital had owned The Palms since 2007, when it bought the mall from Christchurch businessmen and Hallenstein Glassons directors Tim Glasson and Warren Bell. The mall was originally developed in the 1990s by Christchurch brothers Max and Glen Percasky, who own the Homebase shopping centre north of The Palms.

DiMauro Group, an Australian investor purchased The Palms for $88.8 million in 2022.
