= Newstead House, Brisbane =

Newstead House
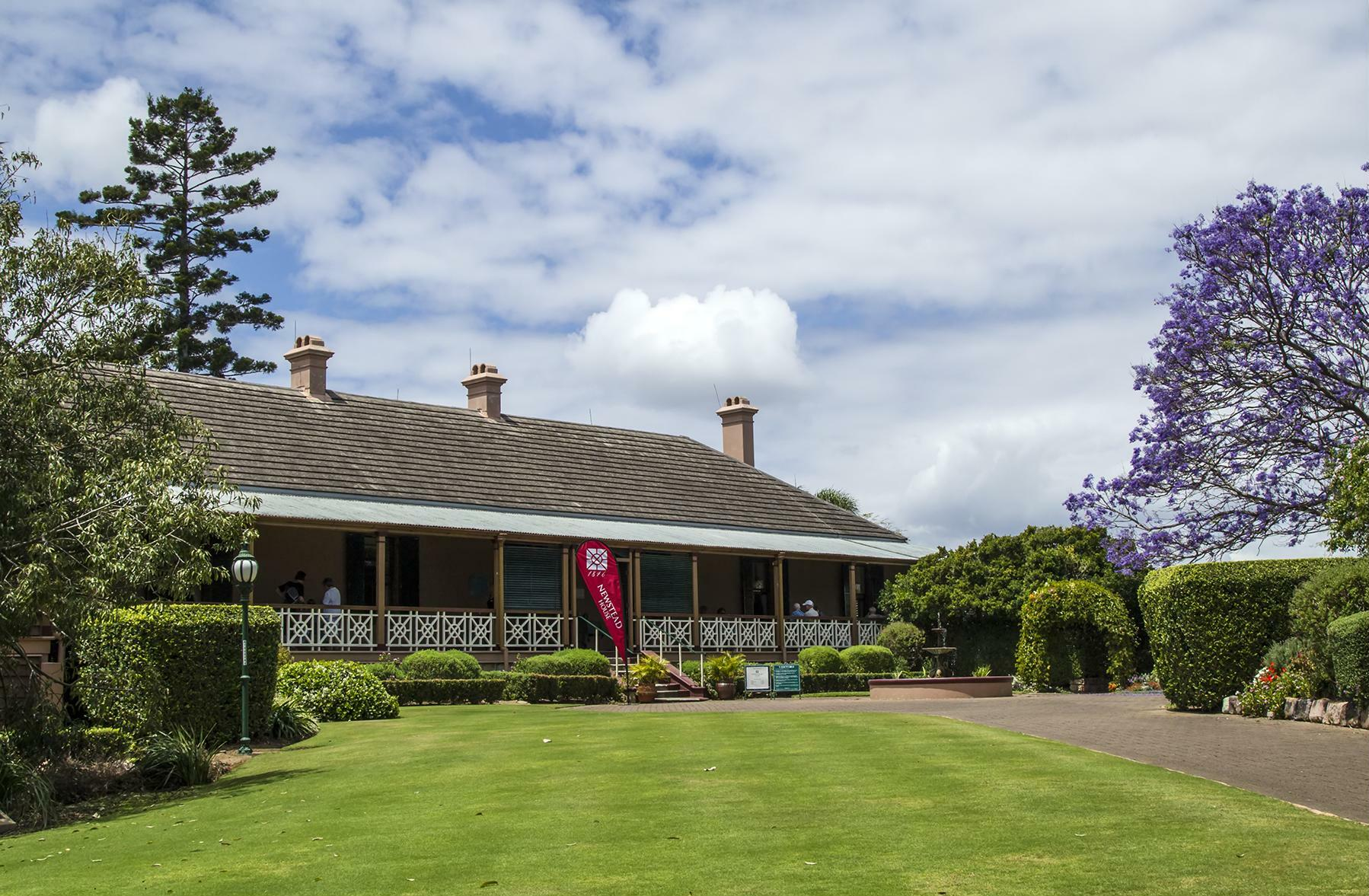
- Newstead House
- Interactive map of the Newstead House area
- Former names: Newstead

General information
- Type: Mansion
- Architectural style: Victorian
- Location: On the northern bank of the Brisbane River at its junction with Breakfast Creek, Corner Newstead Ave and Breakfast Creek Road, Newstead, Brisbane, Australia
- Coordinates: 27.4427°S 153.0462°E
- Construction started: 1846
- Renovated: 1865, circa 1900
- Owner: Newstead House Board of Trustees

Website
- http://www.newsteadhouse.com.au

Newstead House is Brisbane's oldest surviving residence and is located on the Breakfast Creek bank of the Brisbane River, in the northern Brisbane suburb of Newstead, in Queensland, Australia. Built as a small cottage in the Colonial-Georgian style in 1846, the cottage was extended and today is painted and furnished in a late Victorian style.

Newstead House is the oldest surviving home in Brisbane, but not the oldest surviving building, built in 1846, for Patrick Leslie and his wife Catherine (née McArthur). In 1847 he sold Newstead House to his brother-in-law John Clements Wickham (married to Anna McArthur), the Police Magistrate and Government Resident.

Newstead House was listed on the Queensland Heritage Register in 1992.

== History ==
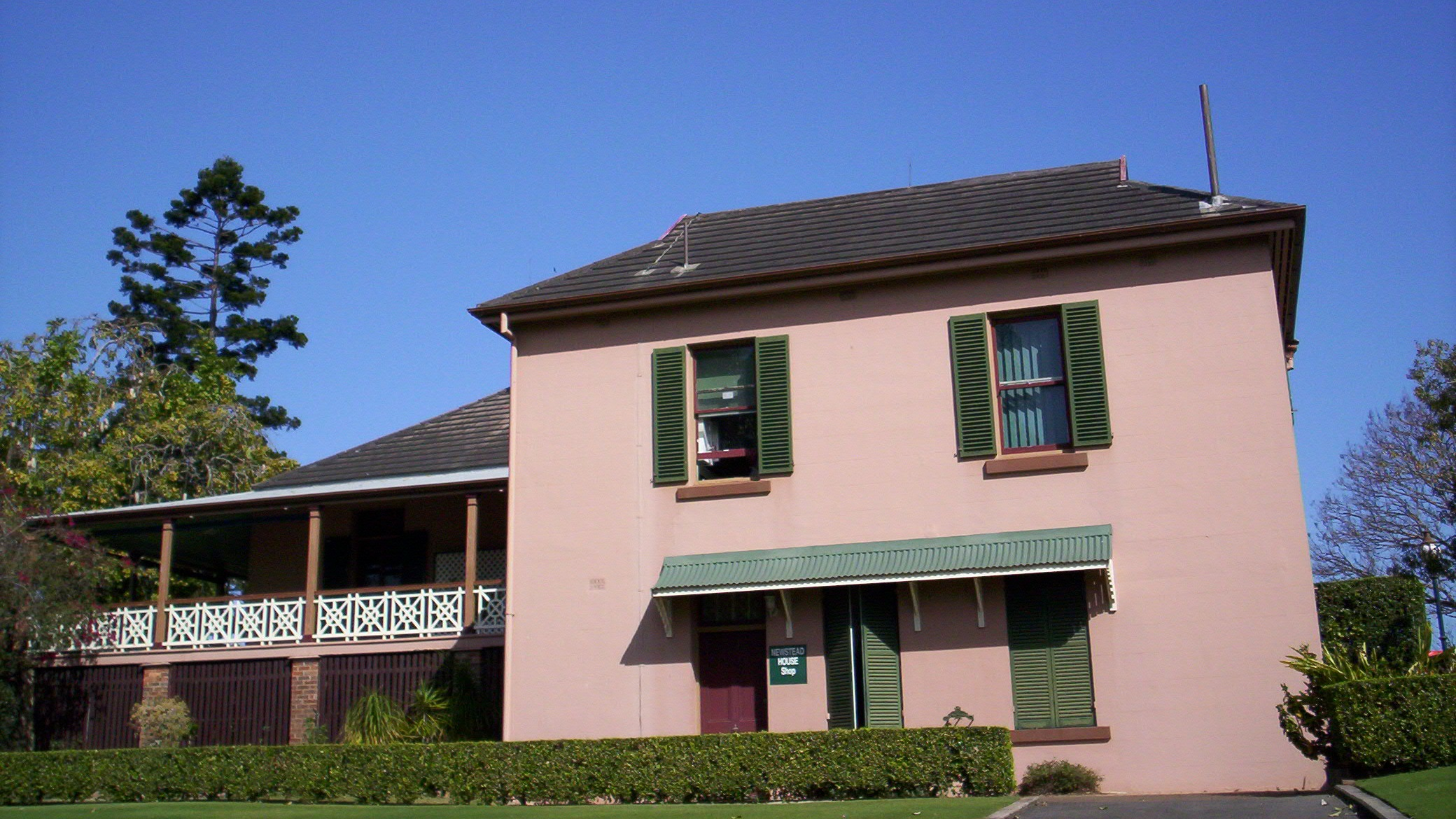
Newstead House – side view

Newstead House is said to have taken its name from Newstead Abbey, Nottinghamshire, England, a former Augustinian priory which became the Byron family home.

The property was referred to as Newstead until it left the possession of J.C. Wickham in 1859 after which it became known as Newstead House.

Newstead House was built as a residence by Brisbane's first architect and builder Andrew Petrie for fellow Scottish settler Patrick Leslie; it was soon acquired by Captain John Wickham. Then it was leased to Attorney-General Ratcliffe Pring. It was later leased, then sold, then leased again to merchant and Member of the Queensland Legislative Council George Harris. George Harris and his wife Jane (née Thorn) lived in the house for 27 years.

A prominent Jewish businessman named Lewis Flegeltaub with his large family was in residence at Newstead House from 1891 to 1894; the family previously lived at Palma Rosa, another Brisbane heritage-listed mansion nearby.

The Lysaght Brothers bought the property in March 1898 with the intention to demolish the house and build a factory that produced iron and rabbit-proof wire fencing. These plans to establish a factory at the property were abandoned due to the downturn in the agricultural sector.

It was purchased by the Brisbane City Council in 1918 and was the residence of the superintendent of their council parks. The Council leased part of the property to the Historical Society of Queensland in 1934 and it was used to store historical records. In 1939, the Queensland Parliament created a Trust and ownership was transferred to the Newstead House Trust.

The building was occupied by American troops during World War II. There is an Australian–American War Memorial in the grounds in memory of this. It was dedicated on 3 May 1952 by the Queensland Governor, Sir John Lavarack.

Other than the war-time occupation it was operated as a museum and research library by the Historical Society of Queensland (now known as the Royal Historical Society of Queensland) until 1973 when they moved to the Commissariat Store.

Newstead House is now a museum. It is open to the public, and concerts are sometimes held at the house and grounds.

Newstead House is now maintained by the Newstead House Board of Trustees assisted the Friends of Newstead, a volunteer group who also organise various events to attract visitors. Newstead Park is still managed and maintained by the Brisbane City Council.

== Heritage listing ==
Newstead House was listed on the Queensland Heritage Register in 1992.

== Newstead Park ==
Newstead Park is a significant historic park.

The land originally formed a part of the land purchased by Patrick Leslie in 1845 on which he built Newstead House.

In the 1920s, the Brisbane City Council constructed an electrical substation for its tramway system in the grounds of the House. Since the closure of the tram system in 1969 the substation was purchased by the Newstead House Board of Trustees and has been used as a Resource Centre and offices for management staff.

In May each year, the park is host to the commemoration of the Battle of the Coral Sea. The Australian-American monument in the park is dedicated to the United States service men and women for helping in the defence of Australia during World War II.

A playspace featuring an "Alice through the Looking Glass" theme has been developed by the Brisbane City Council is located on the southern side of the park, near Newstead Avenue.

Highlights of Newstead Park
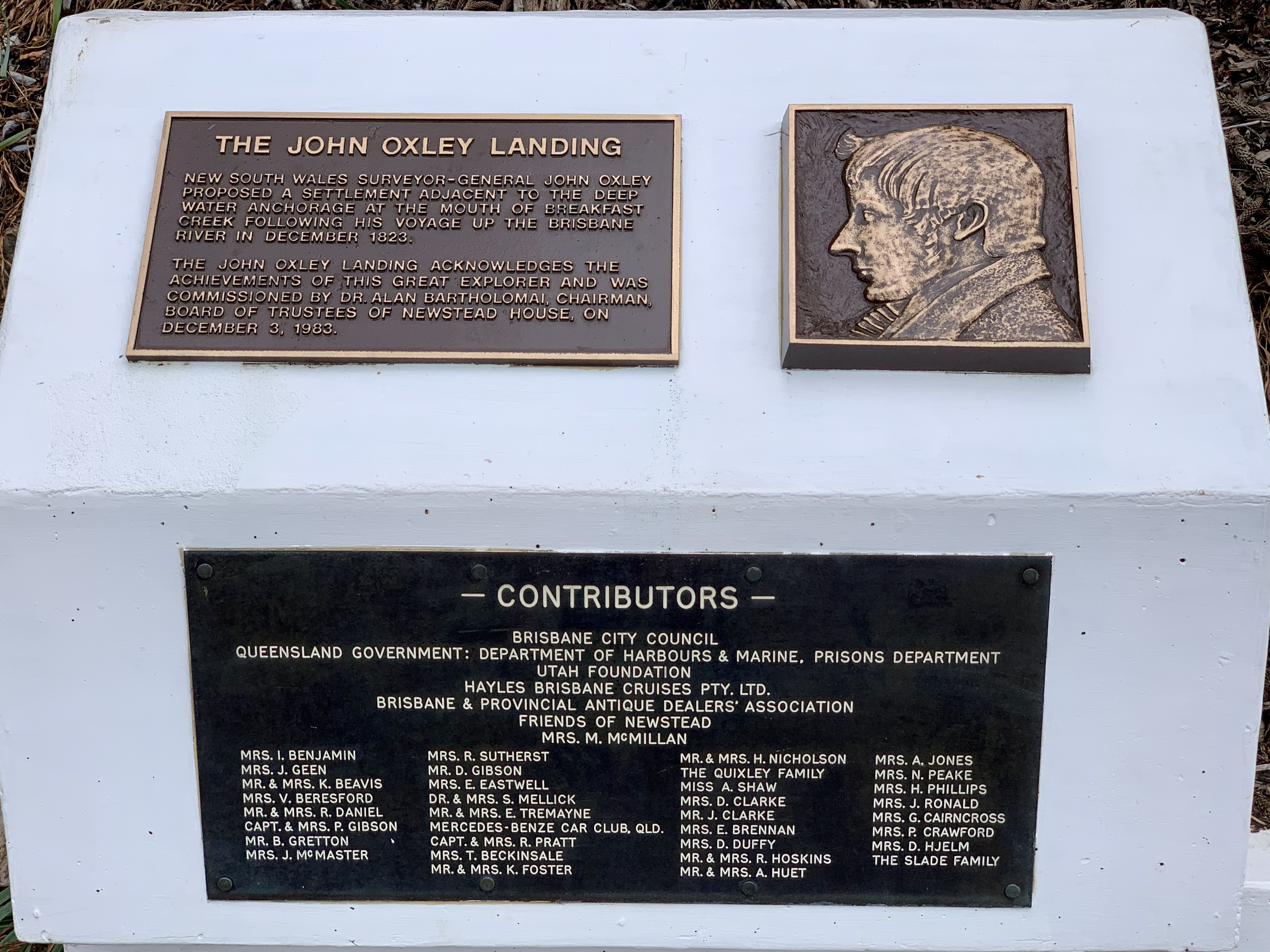
The John Oxley Landing Memorial, erected 1983

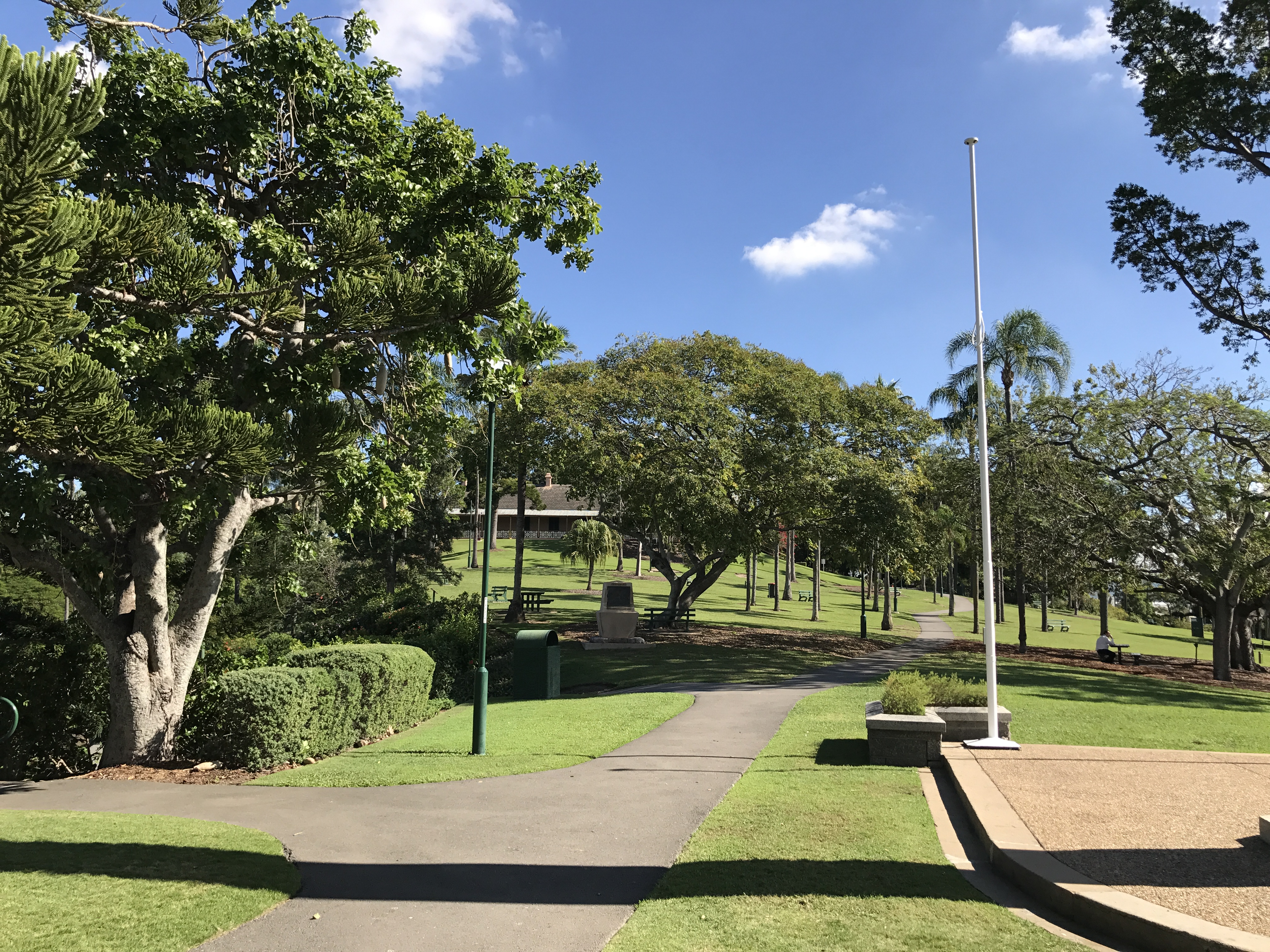
Newstead Park

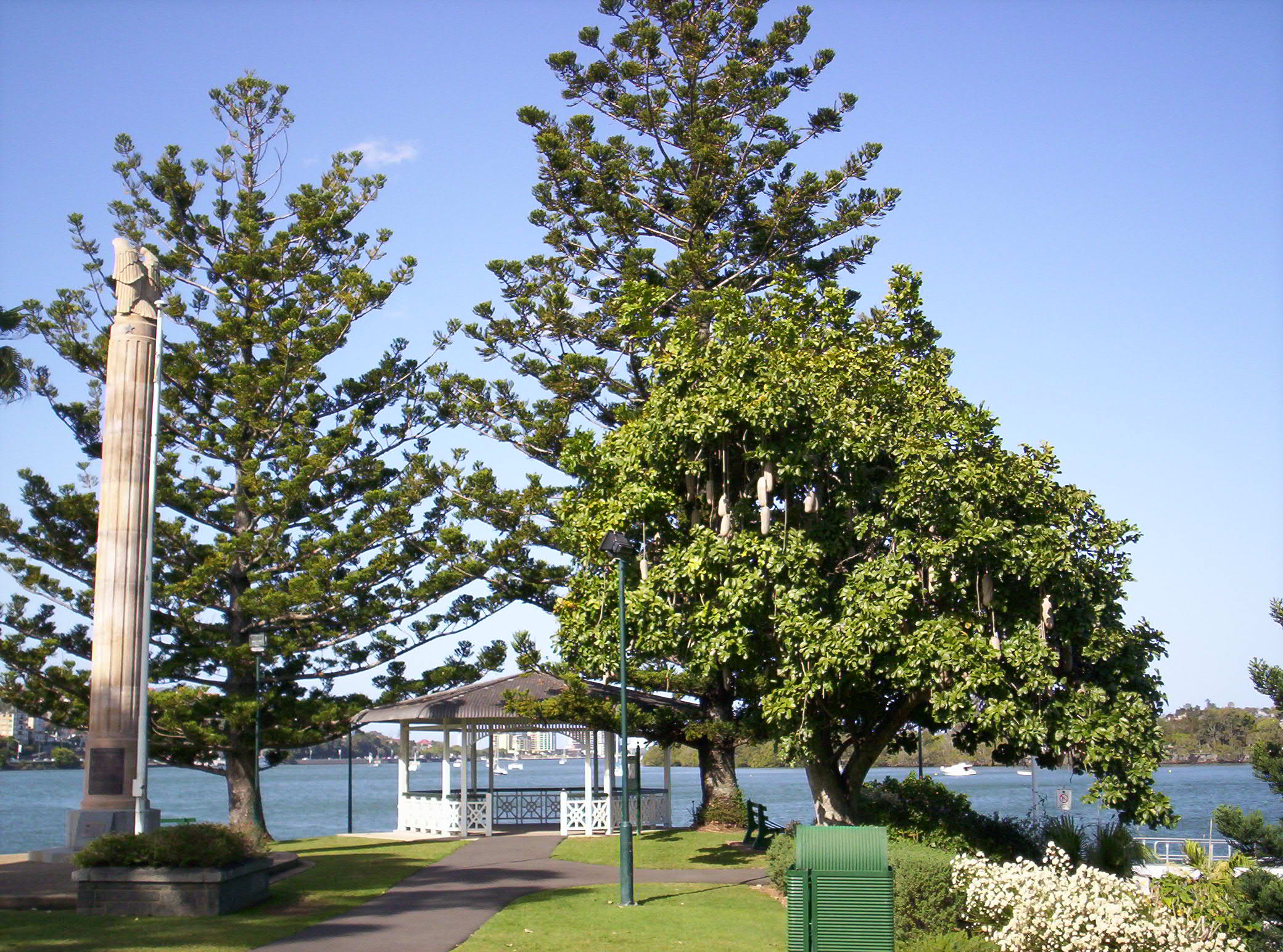
Monument to United States service men and women and gazebo

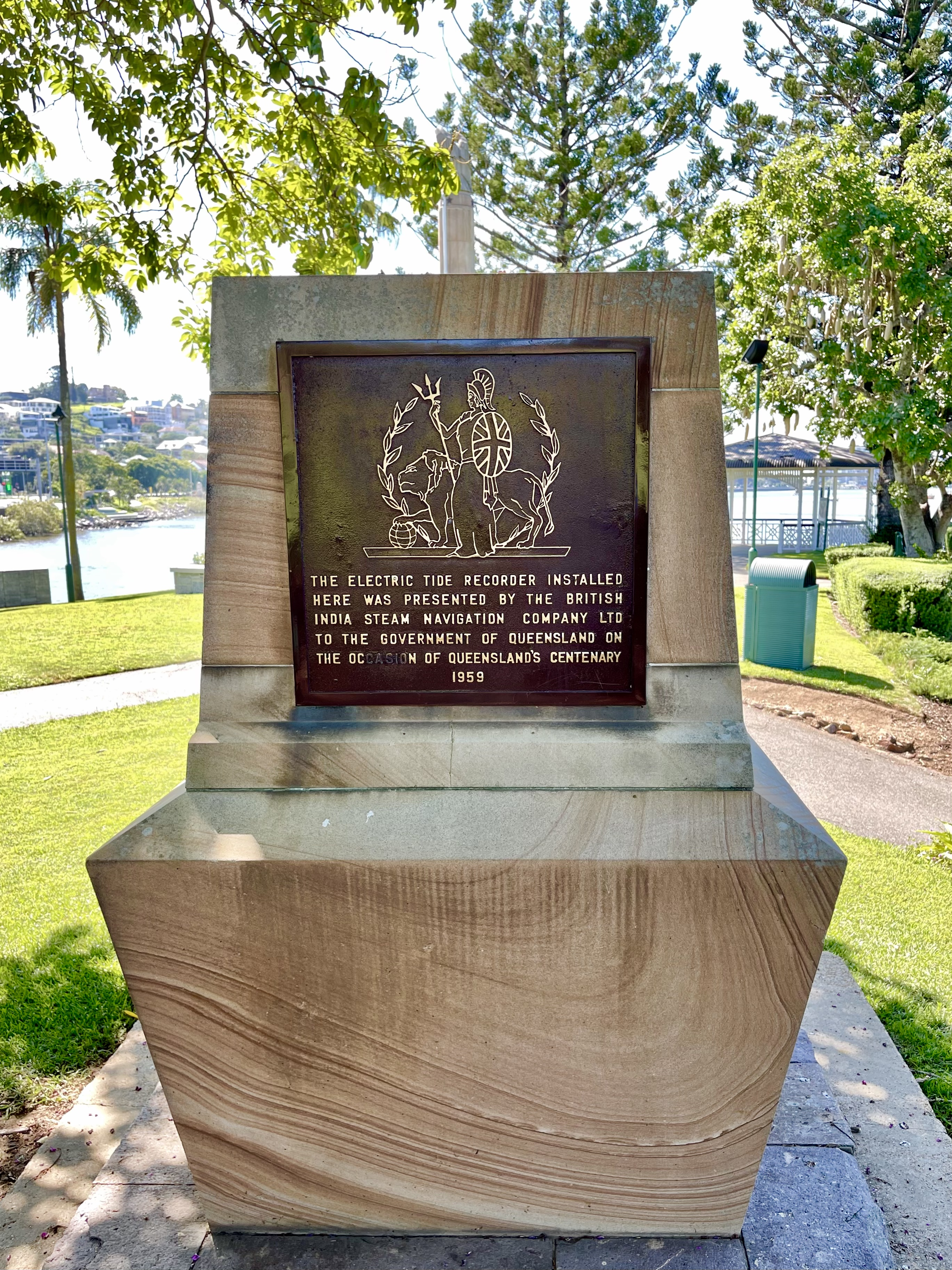
Electric Tide Recorder, erected 1959

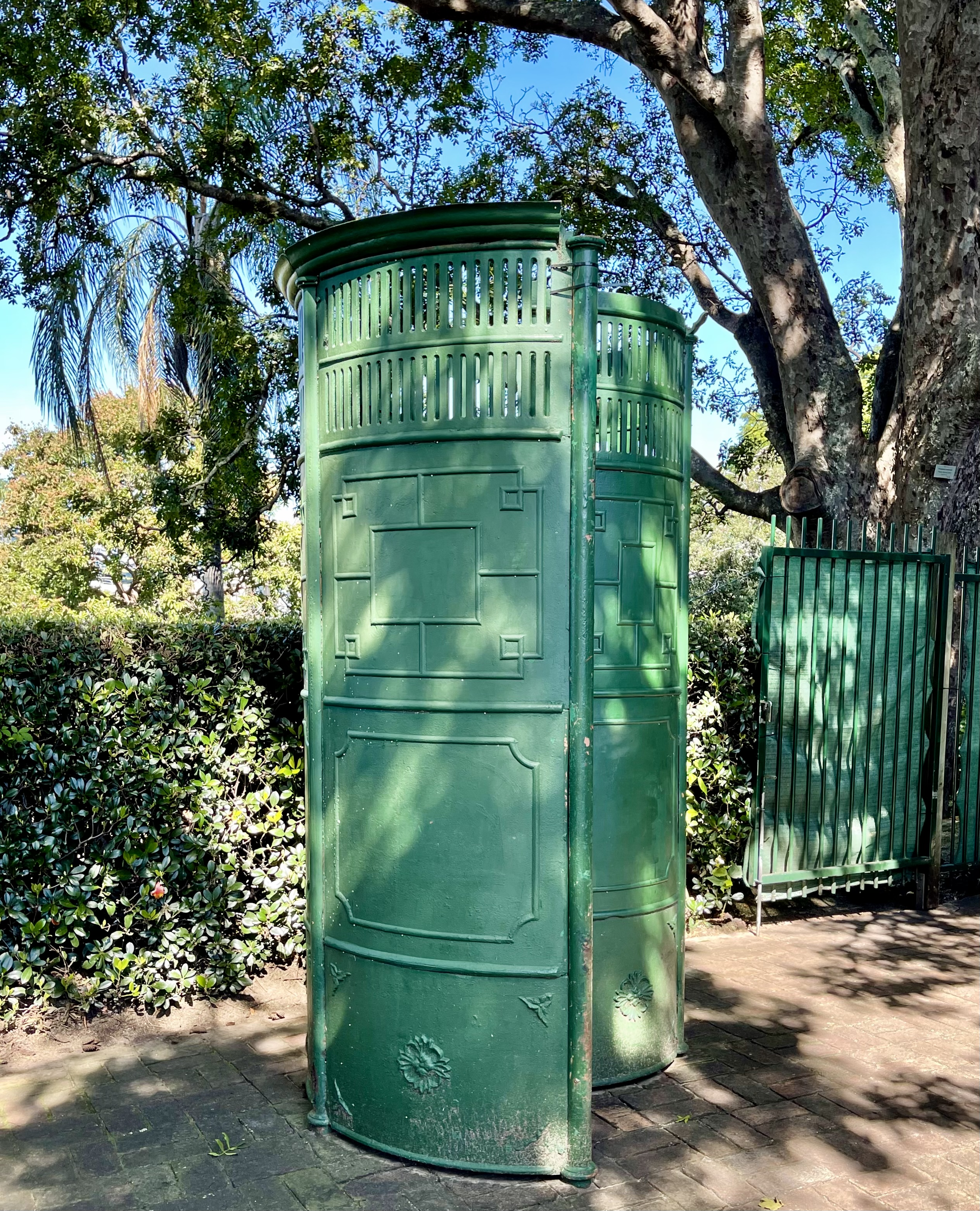
Cast iron pissoir, relocated to Newstead Park in 1960s

== See also ==
- Old Government House
