= Newstead Gasworks =

Former gasometer in the city of Brisbane, Queensland, Australia

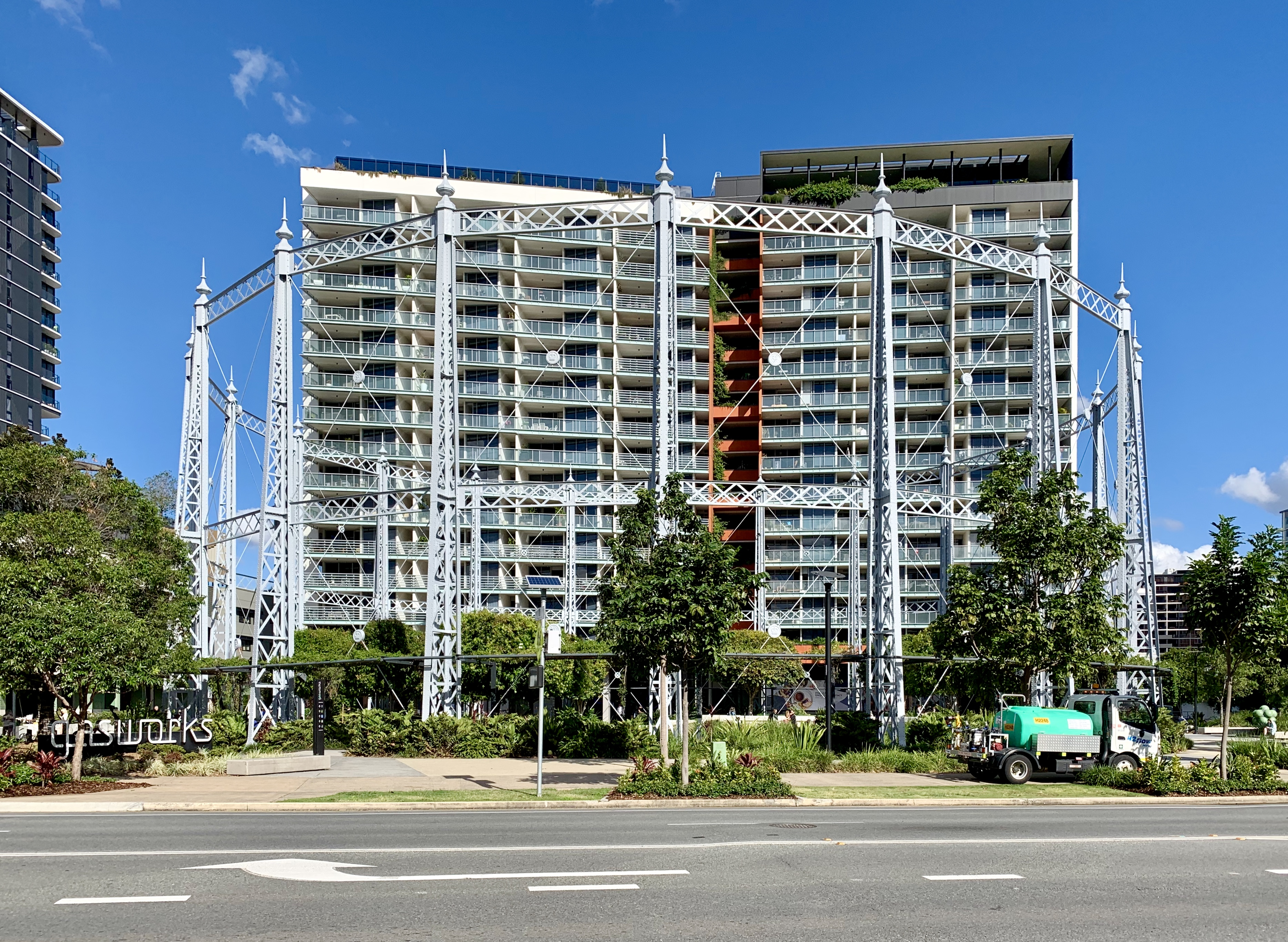
- Newstead Gasworks, repurposed as an open air amphitheatre, 2020

- Location within Queensland Location within Australia
- 27.4505°S 153.0434°E
- Location: 70 Longland Street, Teneriffe, City of Brisbane, Queensland, Australia

History
- Design period: 1870s–1890s (late 19th century)
- Built: 1873–1887

Queensland Heritage Register
- Official name: Newstead Gasworks No.2 gasholder (remnants) and guide framing, Brisbane Gas Company Gasworks
- Type: state heritage (built)
- Designated: 24 June 2005
- Reference no.: 601594
- Significant period: 1873–1887 (fabric); 1973–1999 (historical)

Newstead Gasworks is a heritage-listed former gasometer at 70 Longland Street, Teneriffe, City of Brisbane, Queensland, Australia. It was built from 1873 to 1887. It is also known as Brisbane Gas Company Gasworks and Newstead Gasworks No.2 gasholder. It was added to the Queensland Heritage Register on 24 June 2005.

== History ==
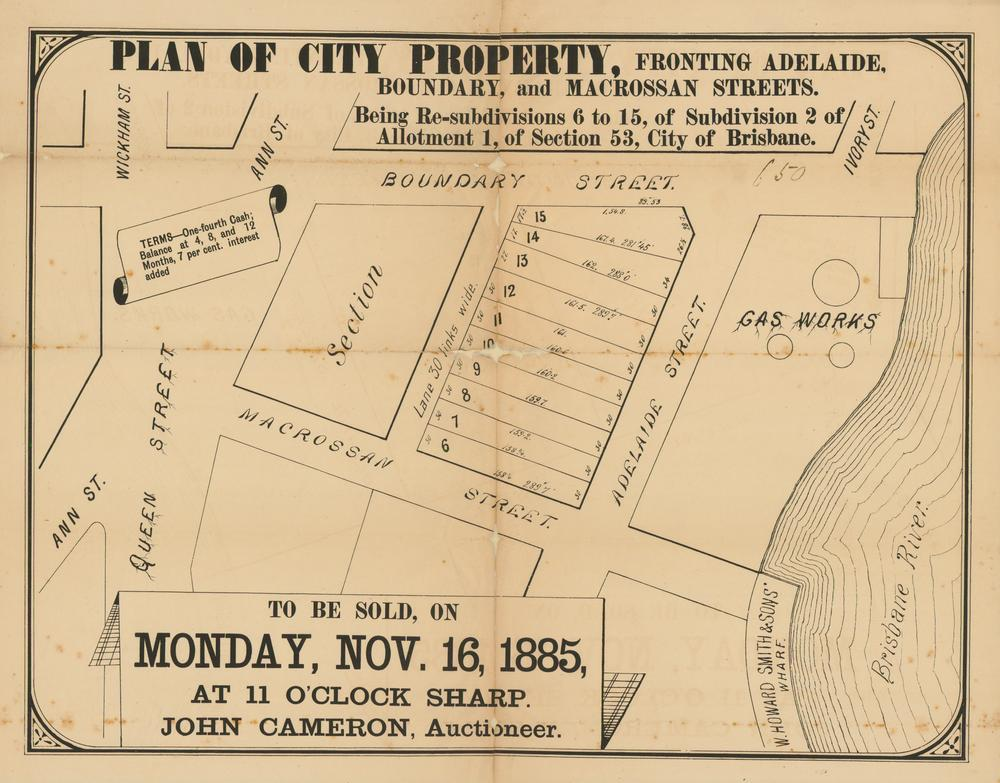
Estate map showing gasworks at Petrie Bight, 1885

The Newstead Gasworks was established in 1887, as the second Brisbane gasworks. The surviving Newstead Gasworks No.2 gasholder (remnants) and guide framing was erected at that time and was probably moved from the original gas works site at Petrie Bight where it was erected in 1873.

From 1861 to 1864, Brisbane's population more than doubled, to 12,551. In the mid-1860s, Brisbane's infrastructure blossomed, with construction of the first cross-river bridge, a new Brisbane Town Hall, a vastly improved water supply and its first gasworks. Commercial gas supply originated in London in 1812, Sydney in 1841 and Melbourne in 1856.

The Brisbane Municipal Council was anxious to provide street lighting, for which gas was seen as the only feasible system. Earlier in the decade, the Colonial Government, supposedly for health reasons, refused permission for the Council to establish a gasworks on a site at Petrie's Bight. On the same site, however, in 1864, the Government authorised private enterprise to establish this new public utility. Central to these decisions was the Minister for Lands and Works, Arthur Macalister, then at the epicentre of friction between the Government and the Brisbane Council, friction which has erupted on several occasions ever since.

One of the founding directors of the Company in 1864 was Lewis Adolphus Bernays, secretary for the first 37 years, and eventually a board member, of the (Brisbane) Board of Waterworks. Bernays, also listed in Who's Who from 1851 to 1905, was prominent in a number of Queensland organisations including the Acclimatisation Society, and held the position of clerk of the Queensland Legislative Assembly.

Brisbane Gas Company production started at Petrie Bight in November 1865. The streets of Brisbane were lit. Soon after, however, council's arrears of payment resulted in its gas being turned off, with the streets plunged back into darkness. The streets remained unlit until the council's (and the colony's) financial situation had recovered sufficiently, in 1870. By 1873, the boot was on the other foot. The council's cash flow had recovered, but gas flow could not satisfy demand. The Company duly solved the problem by installing another, larger (No.2) gasholder (probably known then as a gasometer).

The 81-year-long association of the Cowlishaw family with the board of the company also started in 1873. James Cowlishaw, later the Hon. James Cowlishaw, Member of the Queensland Legislative Council, an architect, was chairman for 41 years. He served on the board for 45 years. His brother George Cowlishaw also served on the board for 28 years from 1884. James Cowlishaw was succeeded in the chair by his son Thomas Owen Cowlishaw, who served for 34 years until 1954. A fourth Cowlishaw, George Owen Cowlishaw, was involved with the Company in 1939.

The main demand for gas during the 1870s was probably for lighting, and the Municipal Council was almost certainly the Brisbane Gas Company's biggest customer. After the financial woes of the later 1860s there followed two decades of steady growth in Brisbane, reflected in an increase of demand for gas, for both lighting and for domestic and industrial fuel. Supply was expanded to, among other places, South Brisbane. The company had outgrown the Petrie's Bight site, and acquired 22 acres (8.9 ha) of suitable land at Newstead, in 1883. Further adjoining land was bought in 1885 to facilitate the company's first major expansion.

The company's engineer for the shift from Petrie Bight to Newstead was JH Tomlinson, arriving in 1880 from a previous appointment in Birmingham. He presumably managed the design, supply and erection of the new gasworks. The equipment, much of it imported from England, was landed at the company's wharf at the Brisbane River frontage of the site. The company first manufactured and stored town gas at Newstead in 1887 after a period of 22 years manufacture at Petrie Bight.

As part of the shift to Newstead, the Petrie's Bight gasholder No.2, constructed in 1873 from puddled iron, was re-erected on the recently acquired land at Longland Street. No.1 gasholder remained at Petrie Bight. At this time, the first weight-controlled governor would have been installed in its governor house.

Just as had occurred in the early 1860s, the land boom of the 1880s was reflected in booming demand for gas. Events proved that there was room for a second gasworks. The South Brisbane Gas and Light Company Limited was formed in 1885, entered the market very aggressively, and produced its first gas at the end of 1886. By this time, gas was increasingly in use for domestic fuel as well as for lighting. A price-cutting war lasted until 1889 when the companies, without any concerns about restrictive trade practices, carved Brisbane up into north and south of the river as their respective marketing territories. It was not until the Gas Act of 1916 that the government saw fit to look more closely at the cosy arrangements between gas companies, which by that stage included the Wynnum and Manly Gas and Lighting Company Limited, formed in 1912. The Act dealt with product quality and pressure, and provided for gas examiners. Price was also dealt with. (A later piece of legislation, the Profiteering Prevention Act, also encompassed gas).

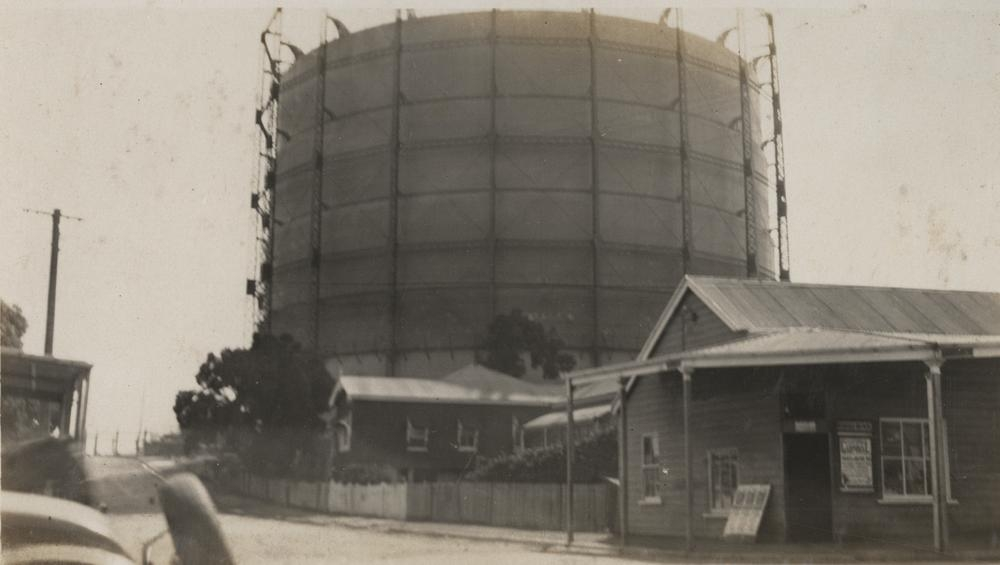
View of Kyabra Street looking towards the gasometer

A further consideration in the 1880s was the emergence in Brisbane of electricity generation for power and lighting. Eventually, as electricity technology advanced, gas lighting would literally fade into the background, the demand for gas as fuel outstripping the demand for use for lighting. Active defence was mounted to protect the gas companies' interests in lighting, and it was not until 1917 that the first permanent electric lighting took to the streets of Brisbane.

The demise of gas lighting would not have been immediate, and the demand for gas continued to grow. In 1929, No.3 gasholder at Doggett Street was commissioned, a four-lift frame-guided steel tank gasholder, again made from puddled iron, with a capacity of 2,500,000 cubic feet (71,000 m^{3}), by far the largest in Brisbane.

In 1937, gasholder No.2 was fitted with a new crown of riveted steel plate.

In the post-World War II period, demand for gas again boomed, to such an extent that at one stage some 5000 newly constructed northside dwellings were completed without their gas having been connected. The core of the problem lay in English gasworks manufacturers' inability to deliver. A major retort augmentation planned for completion in 1950 finally came on stream in 1954, but not until an emergency measure had been taken to erect a Humphreys and Glasgow water-gas plant, for which coke was the feedstock. This came on stream just in time for the winter of 1953.

When the Queensland Railways were converted to diesel fuel in the 1960s, it was judged that there would be a risk of serious damage if a locomotive were to derail near No.2 gasholder. Accordingly, a reinforced concrete wall was built as a shield between the railway spur line and the gasholder. Diesel locomotives were seen as a greater risk than their coal-fired steam counterparts that had used the same track, in the same proximity, for the previous half-century.

By 1965, No.1 gasholder in Ann Street had been dismantled. In 1999, so had No.3, and No.2 has been disabled by splitting a hole in the crown plating, leaving the inside of the gasholder exposed to a moist oxidising atmosphere, ideal conditions for rapid rust.

In 2008, planning approval was given for the Gasworks Newstead urban redevelopment project, replacing the former industrial area in Newstead. The project incorporated the gasometer site and repurposed it as an outdoor amphitheatre.

== Gas manufacture ==
The foregoing history has been compiled in the context of gas storage, with the emphasis on the remaining No.2 gasholder (remnants) and guide framing, which has stored and delivered both town gas and natural gas.

The sources of gasholder feed have been a series of gas manufacturing plants on the site, of which there are none left. The size and programming of the manufacturing plants have been determined by several factors:

- Current technology, both of outlet appliances and gas manufacture technology
- Demand, always closely related to population growth and economic conditions
- Feedstock
- Working conditions at the gasworks.

The following is a brief history of the major manufacturing installations at Newstead since 1887. The first manufacture at Newstead in 1887 was in a retort house containing ten benches of manually operated horizontal retorts. Feedstock was Ipswich coking coal. Output was "town" gas.

A new 1,500,000 cubic feet (42,000 m^{3}) per day West's vertical retort house, embarked upon during World War I, was eventually completed in 1920, with six settings of eight 33-inch (840 mm) vertical retorts 20 feet (6.1 m) long.

In 1926, a Whessoe washer was imported, used to remove ammonia and naphthalene after completion of all other purification.

A further ten benches were added to the horizontal retort house in 1927 when the horizontal retort house was revamped to mechanical operation.

Several additions were made in 1947, in preparation for a major increase in plant capacity planned to be on stream by 1950. A Woodhall-Duckham electrostatic de-tarrer was imported from England, and a Livesay washer was constructed locally. These were of 4,000,000 cu. ft. per day capacity, matching the capacity of the proposed new Glover-West plant on order from England. Also, constructed locally to (English) Holmes design, multi-film washers. Additional Connersville meters were also installed.

The new Glover-West vertical retort carbonising plant, with a capacity of 4,000,000 cu. ft. per day, was eventually opened in 1954. In view of delays in supply of specialised plant from post-war England, a Humphreys-Glasgow carburetted water-gas plant was installed as an emergency measure by MR Hornibrook Pty Ltd, prior to the winter of 1953. While less efficient than the carbonisation process, this process, one of several known as gasification, used coke as its feedstock and was more easily automated. It is probable that the Bryan-Donkin diaphragm-operated governors, housed immediately to the north of and in series with the original governor, were installed as part of the 1954 revamp.

With the arrival of natural gas, the retort houses and the water-gas plant were duly retired from service, to be replaced, in 1968 with a Vickers-Zimmer plant, supplemented in 1973 by an Onia-Geigy plant ex Adelaide. These gasification plants synthesised town gas from oil refinery material and natural gas, until the eventual 1996 conversion of the older suburbs to natural gas.

The older carbonisation plants were demolished in 1994, and the gasification plants in 1999, along with gasholder No.3 in Doggett Street. In 2002, approval was given to demolish the brick governor houses and to remove associated machinery and pipe work, to demolish the storage shed and concrete safety wall, and to construct new commercial buildings and an adjacent road surrounding the gasometer. Approval was also given to excavate the site and remove its crown and inner gaslifts.

== Description ==
All items of gas manufacture, such as retort houses, exhausters, condensers, gasification plants, scrubbers, washers, purifiers, have been demolished. Most of these lay on the eastern side of the site. The weighbridge and the compressor house have also been demolished.

The only remaining items of historical engineering interest remaining on site include the Newstead Gasworks No.2 gasholder (remnants) and guide framing. The facility originally had a double-lift 500,000 cu. ft. capacity and was re-crowned in 1937.

== Heritage listing ==
Newstead Gasworks No.2 gasholder (remnants and guide framing) was listed on the Queensland Heritage Register on 24 June 2005 having satisfied the following criteria.

The place is important in demonstrating the evolution or pattern of Queensland's history.

The Newstead Gasworks No.2 gasholder demonstrates the growth and development pattern of the reticulation of a major public utility, the gas supply and its infrastructure, in Brisbane and northern Brisbane suburbs from the 1860s through to the 1990s. Town gas was among the earliest of innovations that significantly improved the quality of life in the burgeoning city of Brisbane, particularly in the boom periods of the 1860s and 1880s.

The place demonstrates rare, uncommon or endangered aspects of Queensland's cultural heritage.

The remnants of the gasholder and guide framing represents the last of the frame-guided type remaining in Brisbane, and possibly in Queensland. The Newstead No.2 gasholder (remnants) and guide framing, constructed in 1873 from puddled iron and part of the former Petrie Bight gasworks (1865–1887), is significant for its rarity, its robustness and its association with Queensland's first gasworks and a major public utility for 125 years.

The place has potential to yield information that will contribute to an understanding of Queensland's history.

The place has the potential to yield information about the evolving technology of manufacture and distribution of town and natural gas in Brisbane and northern Brisbane suburbs over a period of 125 years.

The place is important in demonstrating the principal characteristics of a particular class of cultural places.

One of the principal characteristics of a gasworks was its gasholder storage and other necessarily robust but sensitive and reliable machinery and apparatus required for drawing from the storage. At the Newstead site, the remaining gasholder (remnants) and guide framing demonstrates some of these characteristics of the gasworks.

The place is important because of its aesthetic significance.

Large round structures are unusual and attractive, particularly in areas of predominantly angular commercial and industrial construction such as Newstead. Aesthetically, the cylindrical gasholder with its spherical crown, even when empty, was both interesting and elegant. The aesthetic is further enhanced by the slightly ornate frame-guide structure.

The place has a strong or special association with a particular community or cultural group for social, cultural or spiritual reasons.

For over 100 years, passers-by along Breakfast Creek Road, Longland and Ann Streets, as well as residents of and workers in the area, would have seen No.2 gasholder in various states of filling, silently performing its important function of storing and feeding out the gas supply. For these communities, the gasholder (remnants) and guide framing was and is an important landmark. The material remaining on the site carries with it a strong association with these communities.

The place has a special association with the life or work of a particular person, group or organisation of importance in Queensland's history.

The gasworks site has a special association with a vital public utility, Brisbane's gas supply, for over a century. Prominent figures with long and close associations with the gasworks included Lewis Adolphus Bernays (associated between 1864 and 1908) and the Hon James Cowlishaw (associated between 1873 and 1920).
