= Newstead, Queensland =

Newstead
- Suburb
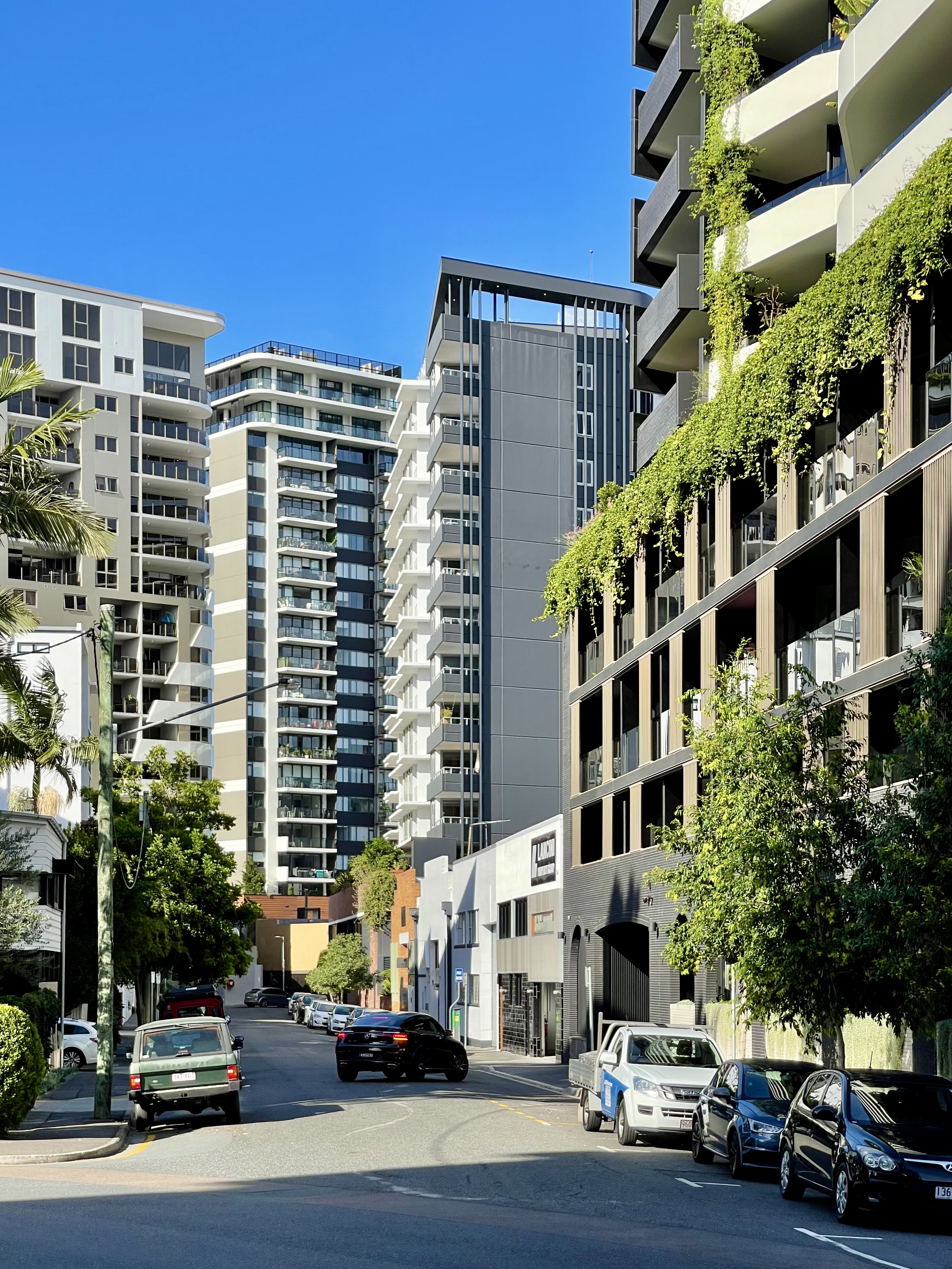
- Wyatt Street, Newstead

- Interactive map of Newstead
- Coordinates: 27.4536°S 153.0442°E
- Country: Australia
- State: Queensland
- City: Brisbane
- LGA: City of Brisbane (Central Ward)
- Location: 3.6 km (2.2 mi) NE of Brisbane CBD

Government
  - State electorate: McConnel
  - Federal division: Brisbane

Area
  - Total: 0.9 km^{2} (0.35 sq mi)

Population
  - Total: 7,496 (2021 census)
  - Density: 8,300/km^{2} (21,600/sq mi)
- Time zone: UTC+10:00 (AEST)
- Postcode: 4006
Suburbs around Newstead
Bowen Hills	Albion	Hamilton
Bowen Hills	Newstead	Bulimba
Fortitude Valley	Fortitude Valley	Teneriffe

Newstead is an inner northern riverside suburb of Brisbane, Queensland, Australia. In the 2021 census, Newstead had a population of 7,496 people.

== Geography ==
Newstead is 3.6 kilometres (2.2 mi) north-east of Brisbane central business district, bounded by Breakfast Creek to the north and the Brisbane River to the east.

The northern and western parts of the suburb, centred on Breakfast Creek Road, is predominantly commercial, with the remainder, particularly near the river, becoming increasingly residential.

== History ==
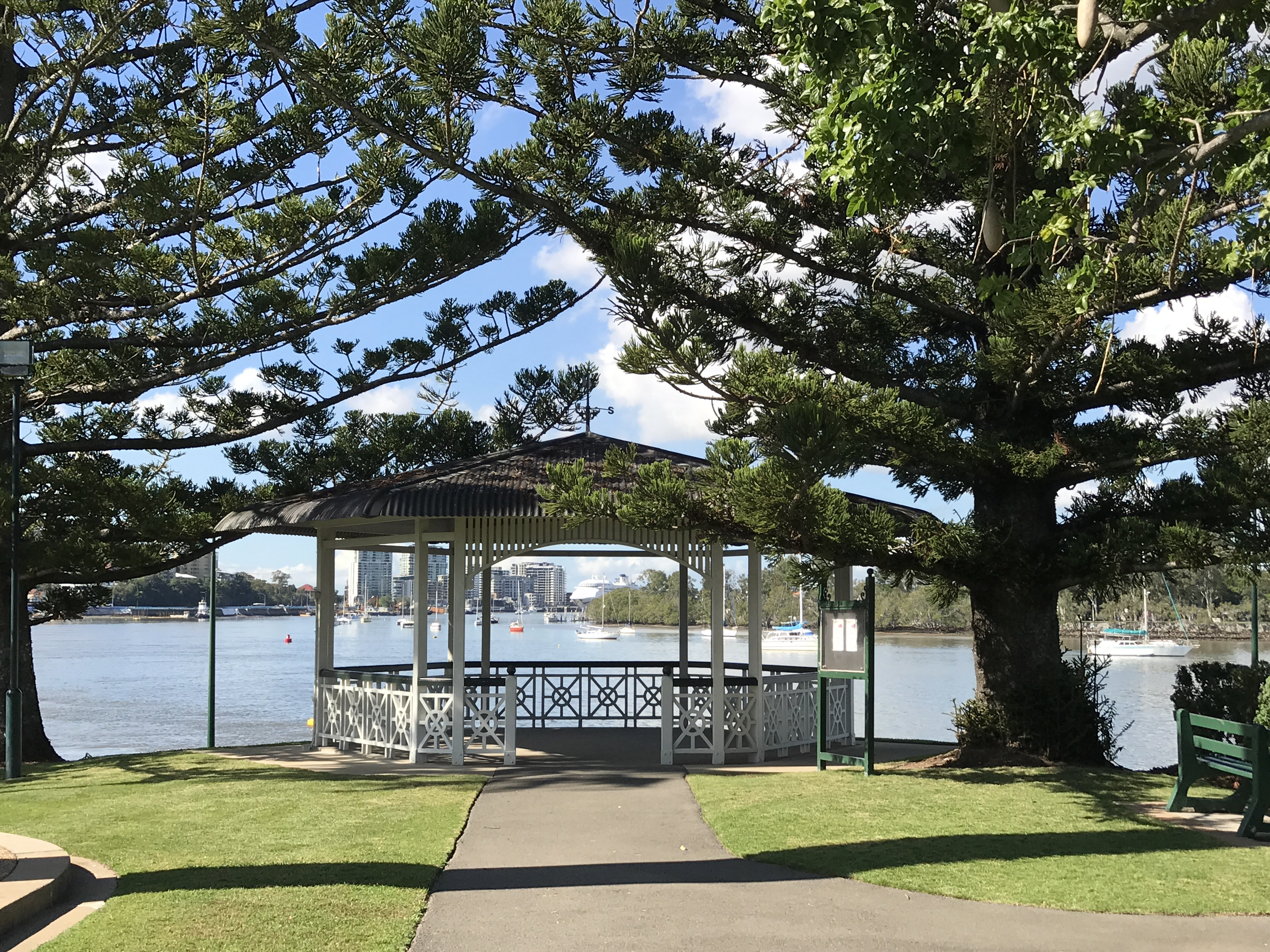
Rotunda in Newstead Park looking over the Brisbane River

The suburb takes its name from Newstead House, built and named in 1846 by pioneer grazier Patrick Leslie, which in turn takes its name from Newstead Abbey in Nottinghamshire, England.

The suburb's present role as an up-market residential suburb belies its industrial past. Timber yards, asbestos works, wharves and woolstores once dominated the eastern side of the suburb. The tall iron structure of the No. 2 gasholder on Skyring Terrace is a remnant of the Newstead Gasworks (27.4505°S 153.0434°E), which was established in 1887 as Brisbane's second gas works. The structure, however, was originally located at the Petrie Bight gasworks, where it was erected in 1873.

The suburb was served by first horse drawn trams from 1885. From 1897 electric trams ran along Commercial Road (until December 1962) and along Ann and Wickham Streets until April 1969. Light Street tram and bus depot was located in the suburb. It opened as a tram depot in 1885, saw its last trams in December 1968 and finally closed as a bus depot in the mid 1990s, making it one of Queensland's longest continually operating industrial sites. All traces of the depot and its heritage have been obliterated and the site redeveloped, although a remnant of its trackwork – a unique three way set of points – has been preserved at the Brisbane Tramway Museum.

In 1888 the Booroodabin Bowls Club was established, making it the oldest bowls club still operating in Queensland. At that time, the club was within the local government area of Booroodabin Division, which was established in 1879 and amalgamated into the Town of Brisbane in 1903. The club's name presumably reflects the local government area. The name Booroodabin is an Aboriginal word meaning place of the she-oaks.

Breakfast Creek State School opened on 7 July 1890 and closed on 11 August 1961. It was on the western side of Agnes Street (27.4404°S 153.0468°E, now in Albion). Following the closure of the school, the Fortitude Valley Opportunity School relocated into the buildings, becoming Newstead Opportunity School. Later it was renamed Newstead Special School (27.4404°S 153.0469°E). It closed in 1996.

The suburb was served by the Bulimba Branch railway line, which branched off the main north coast line at Bowen Hills and descended towards the river and Breakfast Creek Road, crossing it to reach the industry, wool stores and wharves along the river. The line opened on 16 December 1897 and closed on 31 March 1990. Some remnants of the rail line have been preserved in the wool stores precinct. The name Bulimba reflects historic use of this name for both sides of the Bulimba Reach of the Brisbane River, but today it refers only to the suburb on the south side of the reach.

Newstead Park contains the Australian American Memorial (27.4423°S 153.0473°E) which commemorates the United States of America's contribution to defending Australia during World War II, when General Douglas MacArthur based his headquarters in Brisbane. The foundation stone of the memorial was laid on 3 May 1951 during Coral Sea week (the Battle of the Coral Sea was fought from 4 to 8 May 1942). The completed memorial was unveiled on 3 May 1952 by Sir John Lavarack, then the Governor of Queensland.

== Demographics ==
Historical population
Year	Pop.	±%
2006	415	—
2011	836	+101.4%
2016	2,193	+162.3%
2021	7,496	+241.8%

In the 2011 census, Newstead had a population of 836 people, 49.8% female and 50.2% male. The median age of the Newstead population was 36 years of age, 1 year below the Australian median. Children aged under 15 years made up 4.2% of the population and people aged 65 years and over made up 16.5% of the population. 67.8% of people living in Newstead were born in Australia, compared to the national average of 69.8%. The other top responses for country of birth were England 4.4%, New Zealand 3.8%, United States of America 1.9%, South Africa 1.3%, Saudi Arabia 1.1%. 81.6% of people spoke only English at home; the next most popular languages were 1.4% Cantonese, 1.4% Arabic, 0.8% Persian (excluding Dari), 0.8% Italian, 0.8% Spanish. The most common responses for religion in Newstead were No Religion 27.9%, Catholic 25.4%, Anglican 18.4%, Uniting Church 6.6%, and Presbyterian and Reformed 3.1%.

In the 2016 census, Newstead had a population of 2,193 people, 49.4% identifying as male and 50.6% identifying as female. The median age of was 35 years of age, two years below the Queensland median and three years below the Australian median. 55.4% of residents were born in Australia, around 15% less than Queensland and around 11% less than all Australia. 26.4% of residents had tertiary or university institution education, versus 14.8% for Queensland and 16.1% for all Australia. ~56% of residents indicated "No Religion" or "not stated" versus ~39% for both Queensland and Australia populations. ~76% of residents (over 15 years old and in work force) were working full-time, compared with ~58% for both Queensland and Australia populations.

At the 2021 census, Newstead had a population of 7,496 people.

== Heritage listings ==
Newstead has a number of heritage-listed sites, including:

- 96 Breakfast Creek Road: former Police Station
- 108 Breakfast Creek Road: former Brasch's Service Station (also known as Pirie Grey Fegan's service station, U.S. Navy Service Station)
- 126 Breakfast Creek Road: Booroodabin Bowls Club
- 161 Breakfast Creek Road: Primary Industries Dept Office (also known as Hornibrook House, M.R. Hornibrook (Pty) Limited building)
- Adjacent 194 Breakfast Creek Road (27.4416°S 153.0451°E): Remnants of the second Breakfast Creek Bridge (South)
- 199 Breakfast Creek Road (27.4426°S 153.0462°E) : Newstead House
- 4 Commercial Road: Waterloo Hotel
- 22 Kyabra Street: Victorian-era Queenslander houset
- 33 Longland Street: former Wilcox Mofflin Ltd
- 14 Maud Street: former Australian Boot Factory (also known as Federal Boot Company)
- 40 Newstead Terrace: Victorian-era Queenslander house
- Road Reserve Commercial Road (27.4522°S 153.0487°E), now in Teneriffe: Newstead Air Raid Shelter
- 35 Ross Street: Substation No.47
- 82 Skyring Terrace, now in Teneriffe: Newstead Gasworks

== Education ==
There are no schools in Newstead. The nearest government primary schools are New Farm State School in New Farm and Ascot State School in Ascot. The nearest government secondary school is Fortitude Valley State Secondary College in Fortitude Valley.

== Amenities ==
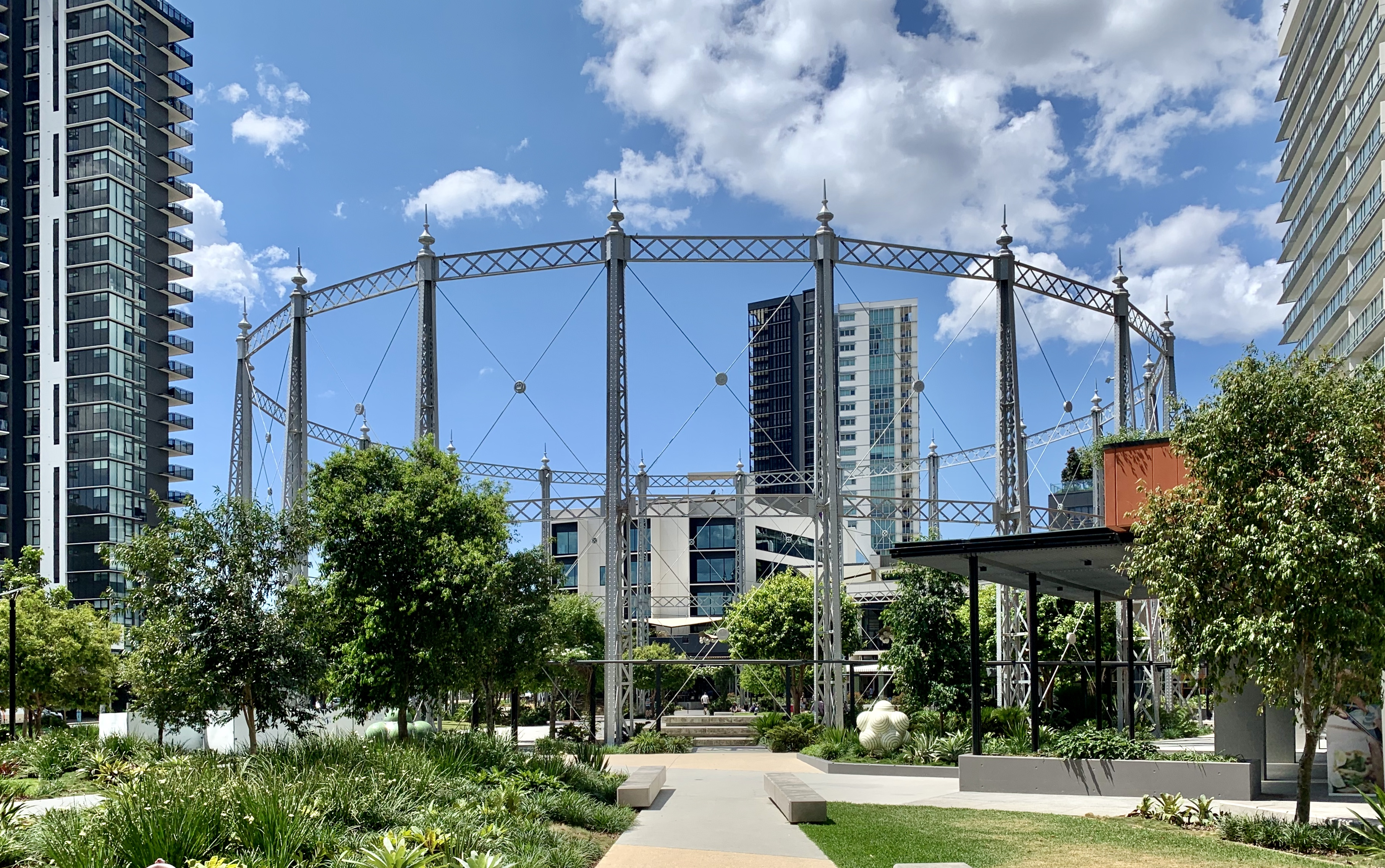
Gasworks Newstead precinct

Booroodabin Bowls Club (nicknamed "The Boo") is on the corner of Breakfast Creek Road and Edmonstone Street (27.4448°S 153.0426°E). The Gasworks Newstead retail precinct includes restaurants, cafes, shops, a supermarket, and a public plaza inside the old gas holder of the heritage-listed Newstead Gasworks.

Newstead House, Brisbane's oldest still-existing home, can be found in the suburb. It was built for pioneer Darling Downs squatter Patrick Leslie in 1846. It is set in overlooking the mouth of the creek and is within walking distance of the Breakfast Creek Hotel. One notable prior resident is Captain John Clements Wickham, who was the magistrate of the Moreton Bay settlement. Wickham had previously been Commander of HMS Beagle and sailed with Charles Darwin. While an admission fee must be paid to visit the house, the gardens (now Newstead Park) are a public park.

== Transport ==
Transport for Brisbane serves the suburb by bus. A cross river ferry, operated by RiverCity Ferries, links the suburb to Bulimba from the nearby Teneriffe ferry wharf. The suburb is also linked to the city by "CityCat" catamaran ferry service.
