= Gasworks Newstead =

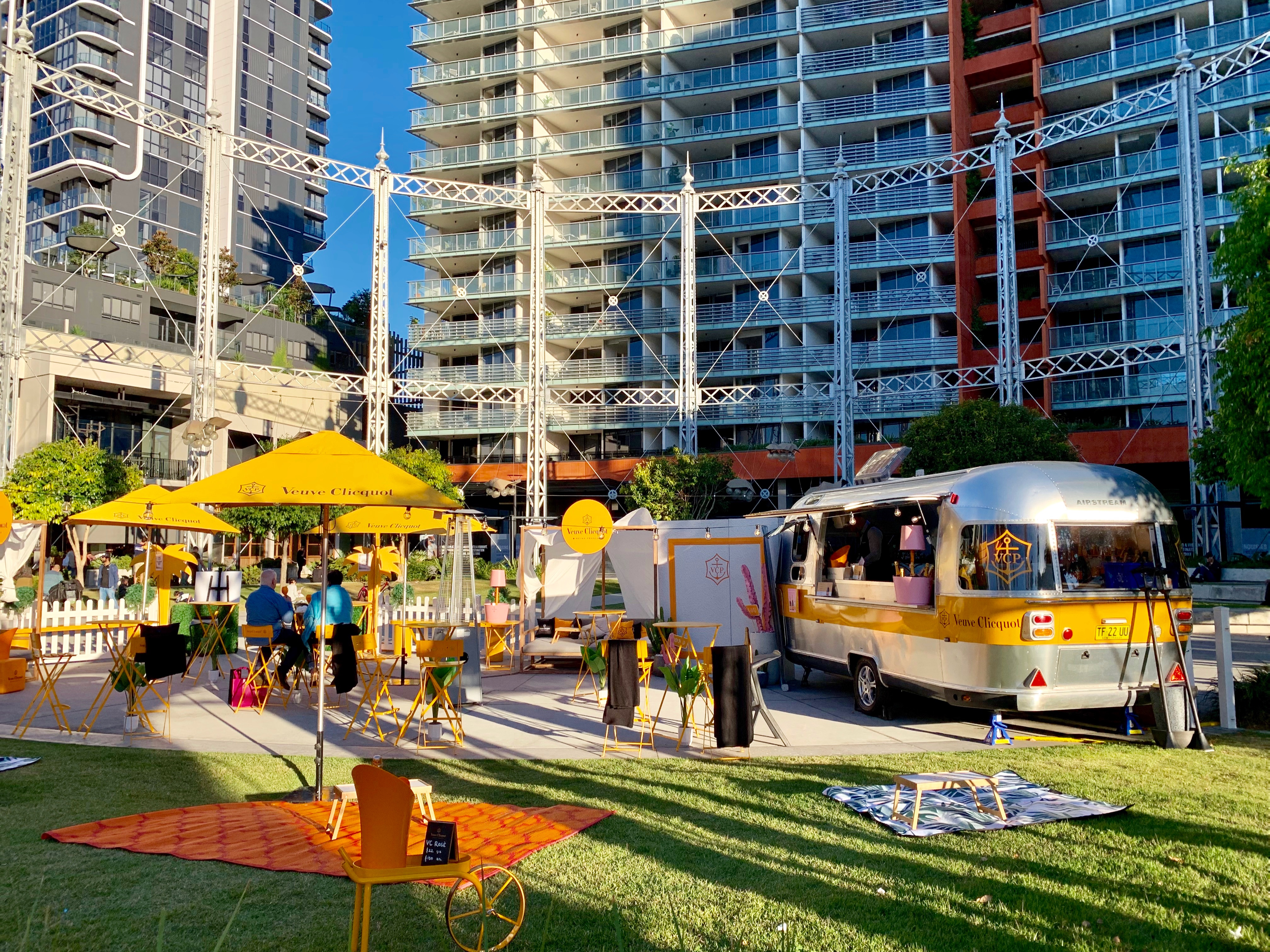
- Gasworks Newstead
- Interactive map of the Gasworks Newstead area

General information
- Type: Mixed use, Office
- Architectural style: Industrial architecture/Modern
- Location: Skyring Terrace, Newstead, Brisbane, Australia
- Coordinates: 27°27′2.25″S 153°2′36.56″E
- Construction started: 1887
- Completed: Under development
- Cost: A$1.1 billion

Website
- www.gasworksplaza.com.au

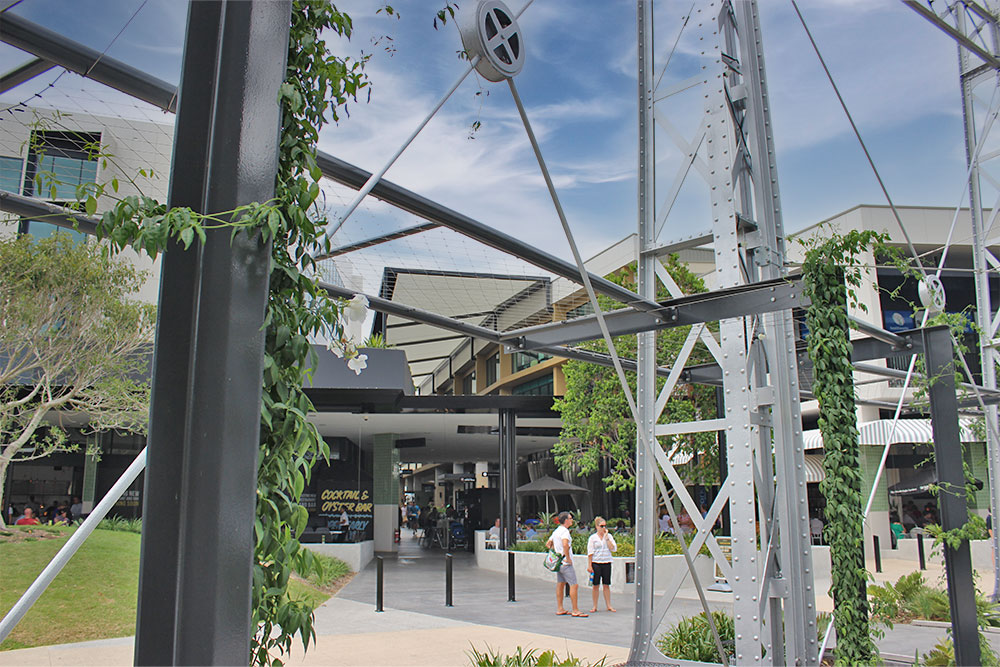
The PTFE Breezeway Roof at Gasworks Newstead

Gasworks Newstead is the commercial, residential and retail development at Newstead, Brisbane, Queensland, Australia. The upscale retail precinct includes restaurants, cafes, shops, a supermarket, and a public plaza inside the old gas holder of the heritage-listed Newstead Gasworks.

Planning approval was given to the project in 2008. The first stage of the development was opened in August 2013. Part of the stage 1 development was a retail precinct which features a PTFE tensile membrane roof over the breezeway. Gasworks includes seven buildings featuring 17,000 square metres of retail, 103,500 square metres of commercial and about 750 residential apartments.

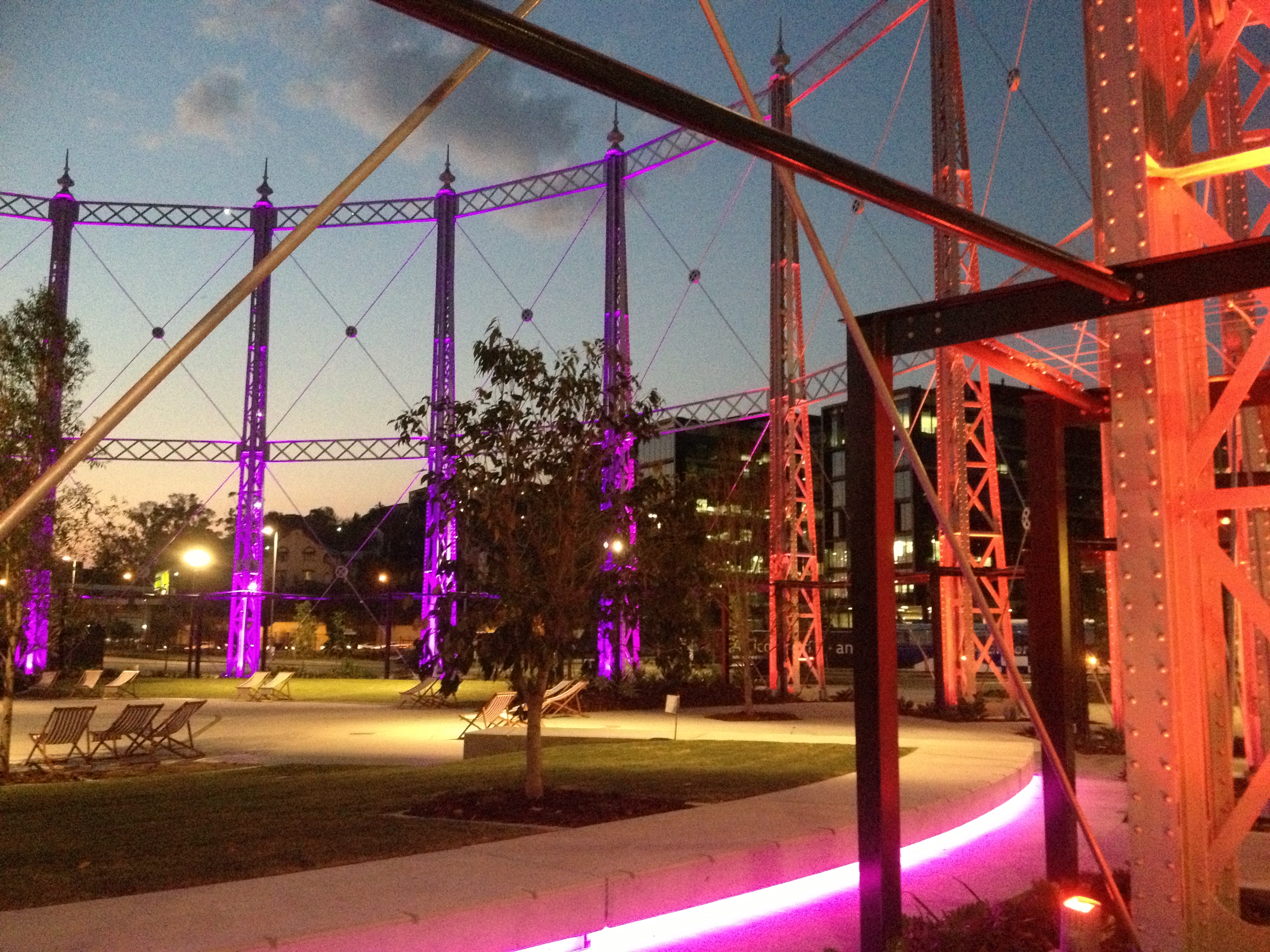
Newstead Gasometer at night

The centrepiece of the precinct is the No. 2 gasometer on Skyring Terrace. This tall iron structure is a remnant of gas manufacturing plants which previously dotted the area. Historically, there were 3 gas holders erected on Newstead site. The No. 2 gasometer was originally built at Petrie Bight in 1873, the site of the first gas plant, and was relocated to the Newstead site when the company opened its second plant in 1887 as Brisbane's second gas works. Gas production was decommissioned in 1971 and all buildings but the No. 2 gasholder were dismantled by 1999.

== See also ==
- Gasworks
