= Bulimba (disambiguation) =

Bulimba may refer to:

- Bulimba, Queensland, a suburb of Brisbane in Australia
  - Bulimba Reach, a reach of the Brisbane River
  - Bulimba House, a heritage-listed house in Bulimba, Queensland
  - Electoral district of Bulimba, an electorate in the Queensland Legislative Assembly
  - Bulimba Division, a former local government area in Queensland
  - Bulimba ferry wharf, a ferry terminal in Bulimba
  - Bulimba Cross River Ferry
  - Bulimba Cemetery, a cemetery near Bulimba
- Bulimba, a former name for the suburb of Teneriffe, Queensland in Brisbane
  - Bulimba Branch railway line, a former Queensland railway line to Teneriffe (formerly known as Bulimba)
  - Bulimba Beer brewed in Teneriffe, Queensland (formerly Bulimba)
- Bulimba Creek, a tributary of the Brisbane River
- Bulimba Cup, a football competition in Queensland
