= Transport in Brisbane =

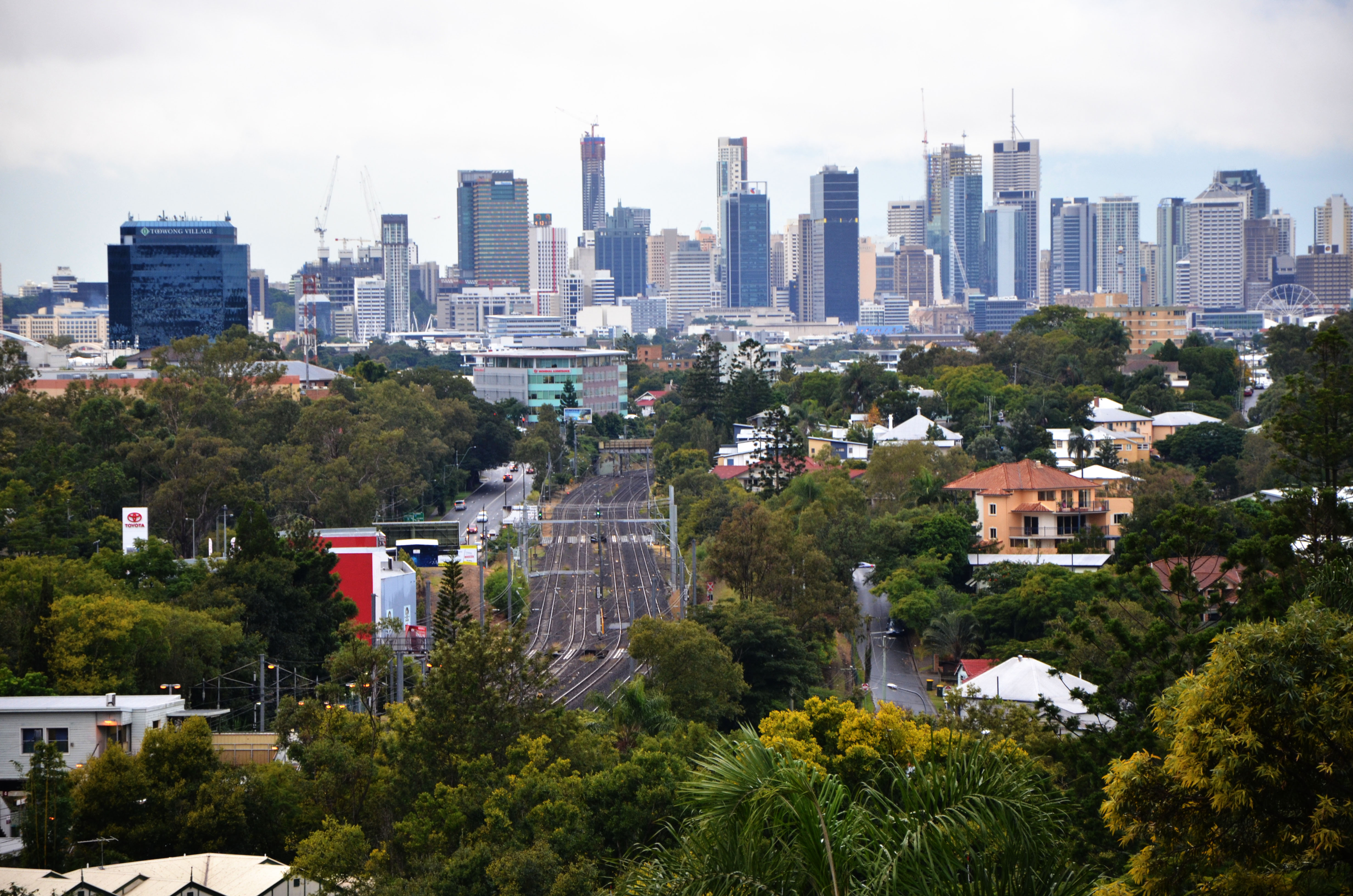
Brisbane City railway lines

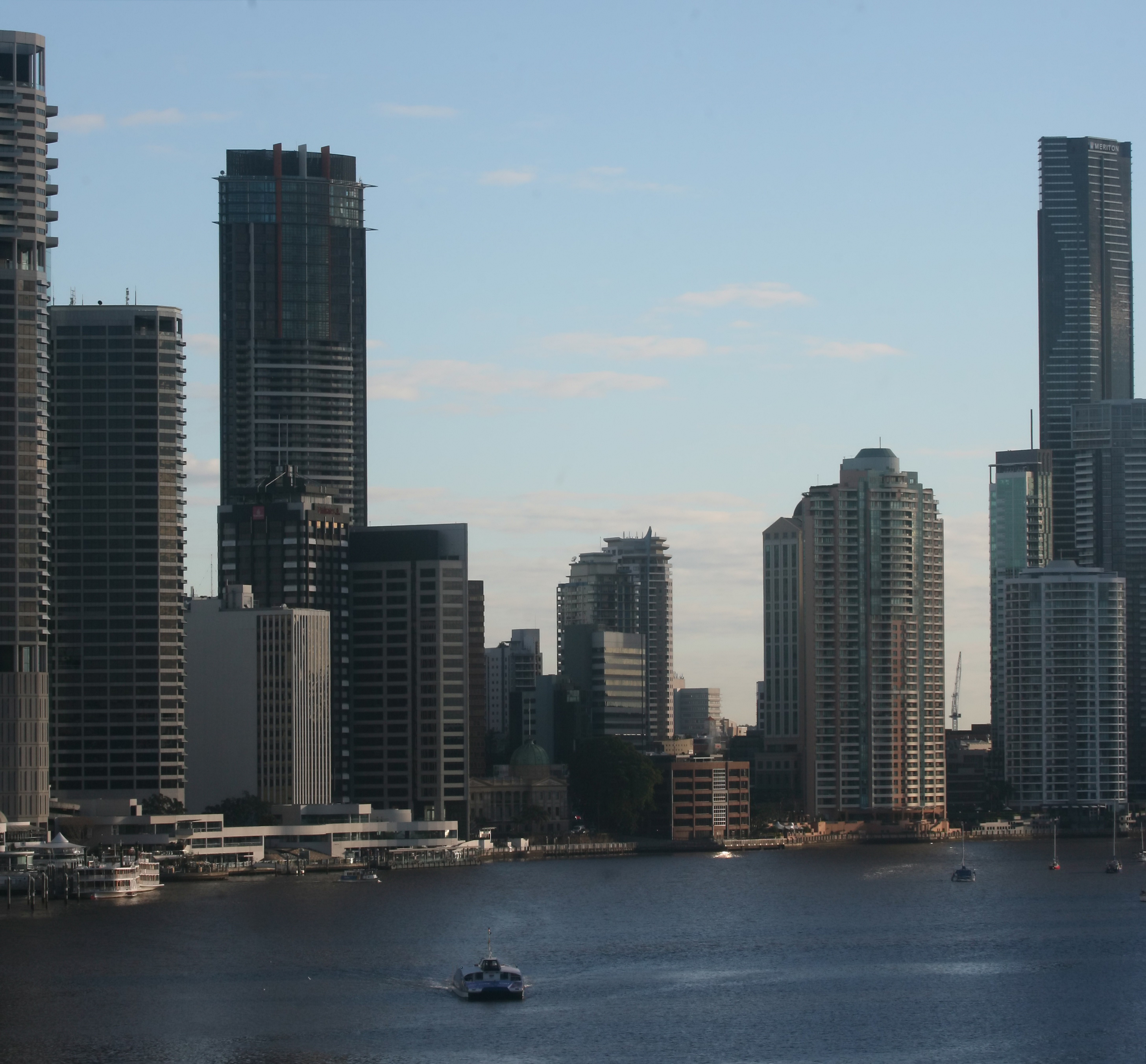
A RiverCity Ferries ferry on the Brisbane River

Transport in Brisbane, the capital and largest city of Queensland, Australia, is provided by road, rail, river, footpaths, bike paths, sea and air.

Transport is managed by the Queensland Government and the councils of the local government areas which make up the metropolitan area, including the Brisbane City Council.

Most public transport services in Brisbane are coordinated by Translink. Train services are operated by Queensland Rail, through its City network system. Bus services are operated by both the Brisbane City Council's Transport for Brisbane subsidiary and private operators, using the road network as well as dedicated busways. Ferry services on the Brisbane River are operated by RiverCity Ferries.

The residential street network is managed by the Brisbane City Council and the connecting arterial road network is managed by the Department of Transport and Main Roads. The Brisbane Airport Corporation manages Brisbane Airport.

== Walking ==
Brisbane is notable for its Brisbane Riverwalk network, which runs along much of the Brisbane River foreshore throughout the inner-city area, with the longest span running between Newstead and Toowong. Another popular stretch runs beneath the Kangaroo Point Cliffs between South Brisbane and Kangaroo Point. Several spans of the Riverwalk are built out over the Brisbane River.

== Cycling ==
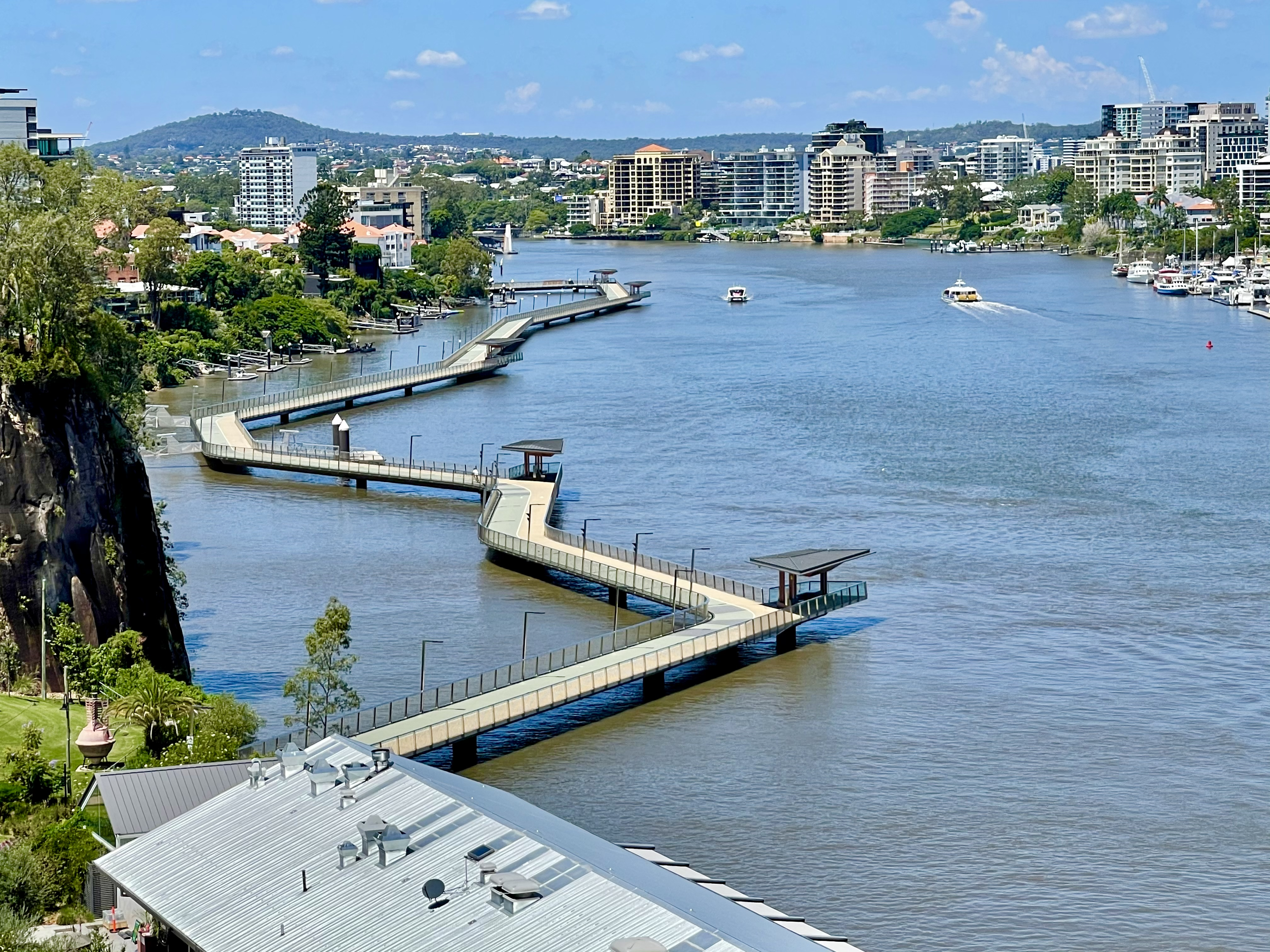
Riverwalk at New Farm, 2021

Brisbane is constructing a number of cycle routes and dedicated, off-road bikeways. The South-East Bikeway is a bicycle only bikeway running adjacent to the South East Freeway. It empties onto the Goodwill Bridge at South Bank, which in turn, connects with the Bicentennial Bikeway underneath the Riverside Expressway. The Bicentennial Bikeway continues along the Brisbane River to Toowong.

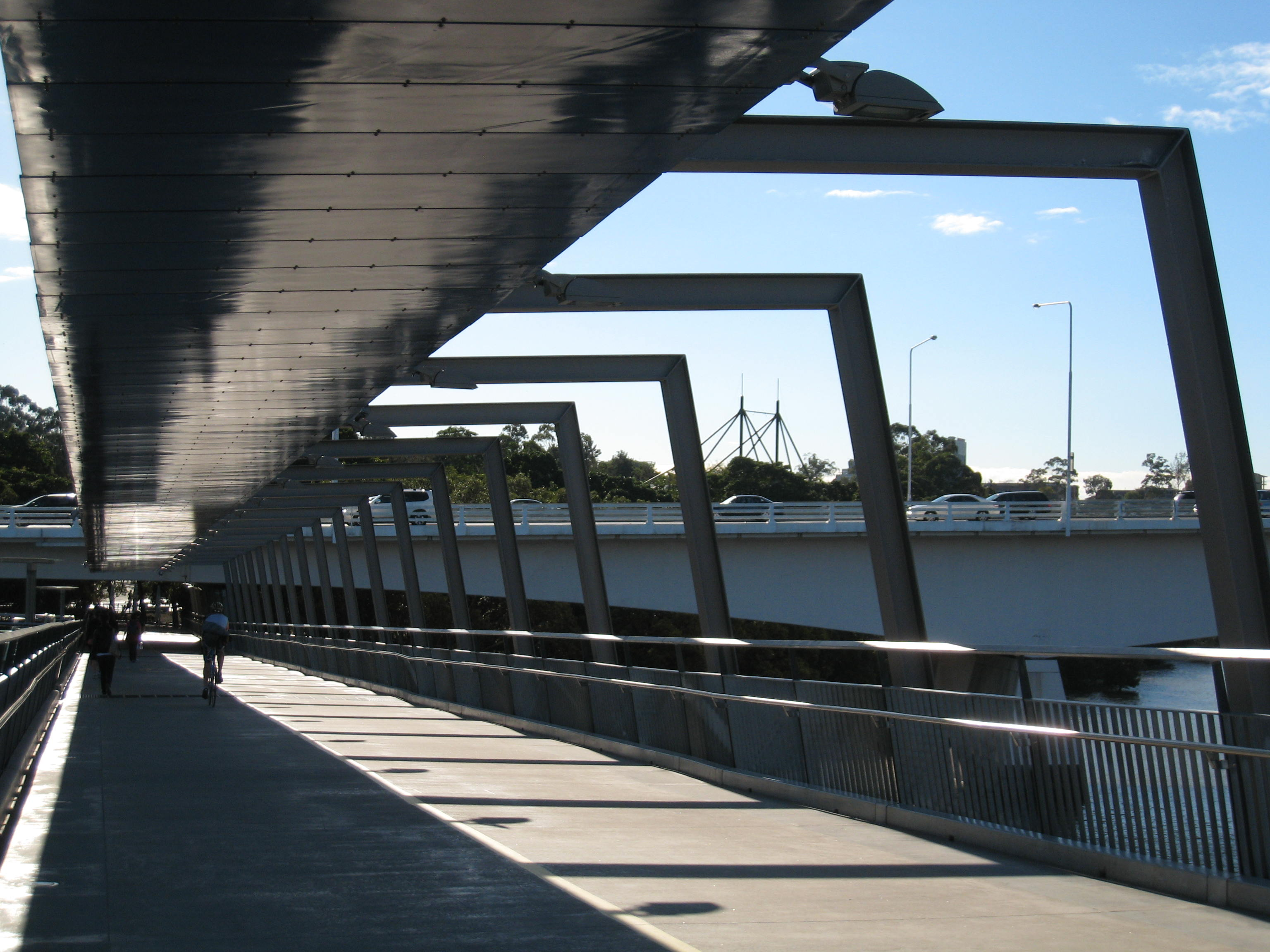
Cyclists on the Goodwill Bridge, 2010

A limited number of buses used to carry cycle racks on the front but this service is no longer available. Bicycles are easy to transport on the CityCats, and many stops have bicycle racks. Bicycles are permitted on Queensland Rail's (QR) Citytrain network during all times. Riding a bicycle on QR property is always forbidden.

A bike station in the King George Square busway station offers many amenities including showers and locker rooms for members. Subscriptions for a Velib style community bike hire scheme called CityCycle by JCDecaux for Brisbane started on 1 September 2010 with bikes available from 1 October 2010 at 150 stations from the University of Queensland to Teneriffe. Due to declining numbers, this service is now discontinued, with JCDecaux being ordered to dismantle and remove all CityCycle docks and bikes. These will eventually be replaced with 2000 electric bikes by the Brisbane City Council.

Lime scooters were introduced in November 2018 as a trial with a temporary exemption as the scooters can travel at 27 kilometres per hour (17 mph) which is faster than the 10 kilometres per hour (6.2 mph) permitted by Queensland legislation.

== Public transport ==
Brisbane's public transport system is provided by trains, buses, ferries and taxis. A large tram network closed in 1969. A smaller trolleybus system closed at the same time, with routes on both systems being replaced by buses.

Translink is a division of the Department of Transport and Main Roads that manages the planning, co-ordination, and integrated ticketing of public transport services covering Brisbane and the rest of Queensland. It contracts Queensland Rail, private bus operating companies and Transport for Brisbane to operate public transport services in allocated operating areas for a negotiated price, and keeps all fare receipts. Public transport fares are a 50 cent flat rate across all Translink services, regardless of how far you travel on the network or how you choose to pay. Translink introduced the go card ticketing system in 2006 and a contactless payments system in 2020.

Train services are operated by Queensland Rail. Ferries are operated by RiverCity Ferries. Contracted buses that serve the regional areas outside and across the Brisbane boundary are operated by private companies.

In 2017, an estimated 8% of all trips made in Brisbane used public transport. After some years of decline, Brisbane's public transport system is being revitalised and finding greater patronage, with significant investment in railway station upgrades, busways, reorganised bus routes and new buses. However, patronage remains a far cry from public transport's heyday in the 1940s, when the tram system alone carried 160 million passengers annually. By comparison, Brisbane Transport buses carried 53 million passengers in 2005, although Brisbane's population has doubled since the 1940s. This figure climbed to 77 million in 2010.

The CBD is the central hub for all public transport services with interchanges at Central, Roma Street and South Bank railway stations; Cultural Centre, King George Square, Queen Street and Roma Street busway stations; and North Quay, Riverside and QUT Gardens Point ferry wharves.

Various smaller transfer hubs, are located at various strategically placed points of public importance and public interest in the city, including shopping malls, which are usually within dense population centres. Many busway stations are co-located with or are near to train stations (e.g. Roma Street or Cultural Centre/South Brisbane), facilitating transfers between modes.

In December 2005, Translink began all-night public transport services on Friday and Saturday nights, under the name of NightLink. These bus routes have numbers prefixed with the letter N, and often carry security guards. The Beenleigh, Ipswich and Caboolture rail lines also operate into the early morning hours.

=== Trains ===
The Queensland Rail Citytrain network consists of 152 stations along 12 lines: Beenleigh, Brisbane Airport, Caboolture, Cleveland, Doomben, Ferny Grove, Ipswich/Rosewood, Kippa-Ring, Shorncliffe and Springfield Central. The network extends to the Gold and Sunshine coasts, which are fully integrated into the network on the Nambour/Gympie North and Varsity Lakes lines, respectively. The Airtrain service which runs on the Brisbane Airport line is jointly operated between the City of Brisbane and Brisbane Airport. The network is completely radial.

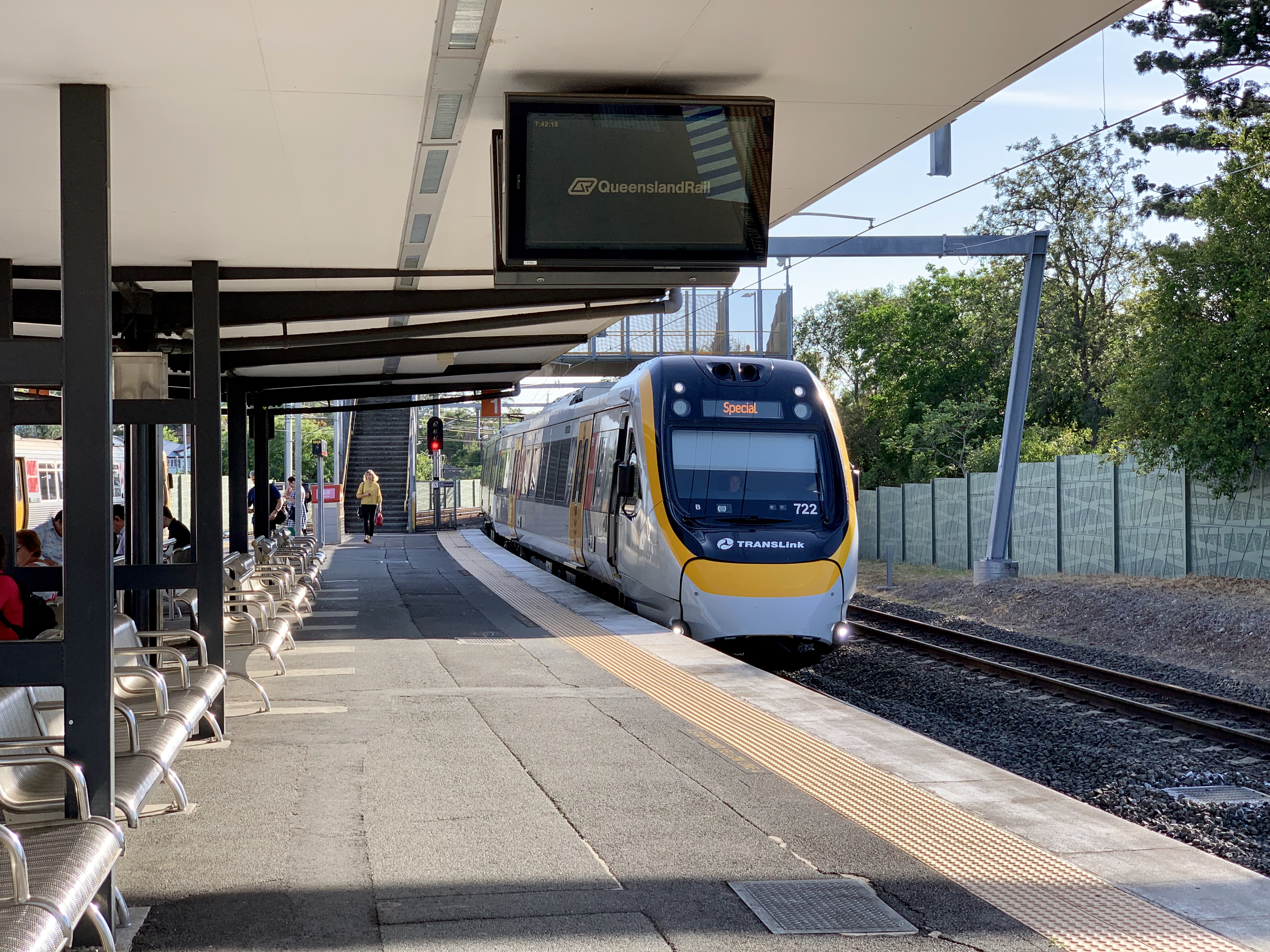
Queensland Rail NGR train at Oxley station

The network has relatively low ridership on a world scale and compared to the city's bus network. Reliance on the rail network is low, compared to Melbourne and Sydney, especially during peak demand periods. Coverage is limited in many areas, forcing people on to buses. 55 million passenger trips were taken across the network in 2018–19. In 2020, the pandemic drastically affected passenger numbers with many services, including peak ones, running at 90 per cent empty.

Construction of the network began in 1865 and has been progressively expanded in the subsequent centuries. Electrification of the network was completed between 1979 and 1988. The Cross River Rail project includes a twin rail tunnel (5.9 kilometres (3.7 mi) long) which will pass under the Brisbane River to link two new railway stations at Albert Street in the CBD and Woolloongabba is under construction and scheduled to be completed in 2025.

=== Buses ===
Brisbane's bus network comprises over 400 routes and 10,000 stations. The city has a large dedicated bus rapid transit network known as the Busway. Buses are channelled into the central business district and surrounds via the South East Busway, the Northern Busway and the Eastern Busway. The central hubs are King George Square busway station and Queen Street bus station.

Brisbane City Council operates most of its urban and suburban bus services under the Translink integrated public transport scheme. Translink is responsible for all timetabling and ticketing on Brisbane City Council (Transport for Brisbane) buses, which Transport for Brisbane constructs, leases back (a sell and leaseback scheme operating between the Council and State) and operates.

Outer suburb bus service providers include: Brisbane Bus Lines, Caboolture Bus Lines, Hornibrook Bus Lines, Kangaroo Bus Lines, Clarks Logan City Bus Service, Mt Gravatt Bus Service, Park Ridge Transit, Thompsons Bus Service, Transdev Queensland and Westside Bus Company.

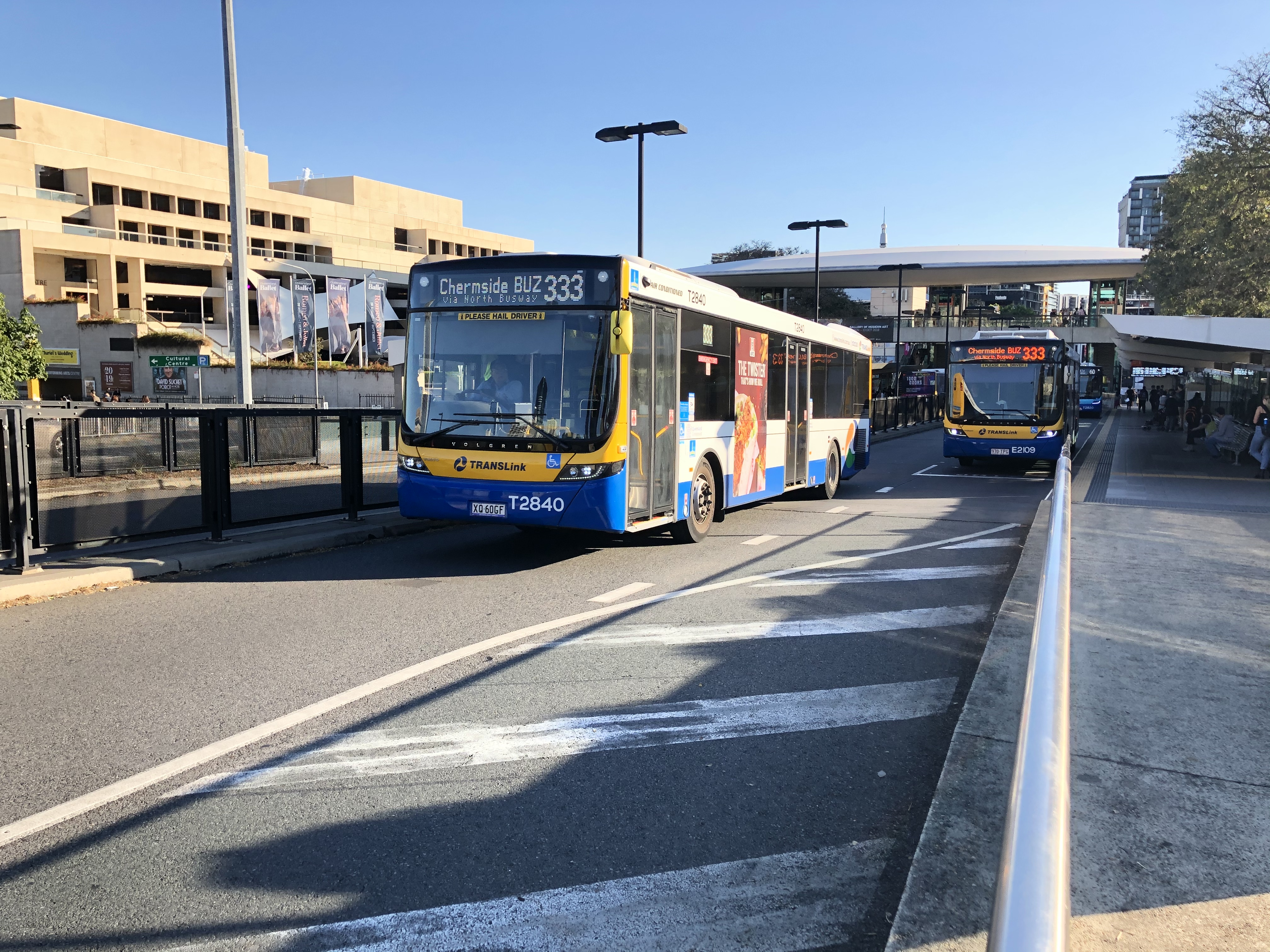
Buses at Cultural Centre station

Buses generally operate between 05:00am and 12:00am throughout the week, with some Friday and Saturday night 24-hour services. In addition to the local bus routes, many routes are express (CityXpress) and don't observe minor stops (marked with a blue bus stop sign instead of white). All Brisbane City Council buses are prepaid (only pre-purchased tickets, go cards or credit and debit cards).

The Brisbane Metro consists of two routes covering 21 kilometres, linking Brisbane's outer suburbs with the CBD. Metro Route M2 commenced service on 28 January 2025 between RBWH and UQ Lakes, whilst Metro Route M1 commenced service on 30 June 2025 between Roma Street and Eight Mile Plains.

The CityGlider consists of two routes covering the inner city. The Blue CityGlider (route 60) operates between Teneriffe and West End via the CBD. The Maroon CityGlider (route 61) operates between Ashgrove and Coorparoo via the CBD. They use branded buses stopping only at specified CityGlider stops. The Blue CityGlider runs every 5 minutes in peak hours and every 10 to 15 minutes outside peak hours. The Maroon CityGlider runs every 10 minutes in peak hours and every 15 to 30 minutes outside peak hours.

The free City Loop and Spring Hill Loop bus services provide high-frequency public transport access within the Brisbane CBD, and between the Brisbane CBD and Spring Hill. The City Loop operates clockwise (route 40) and anti-clockwise (route 50) in the Brisbane CBD from designated purple-sign bus stops, using distinctive purple buses. The Spring Hill Loop (route 30) operates on a continuous loop between the CBD and Spring Hill, stopping at yellow-sign bus stops, using distinctive yellow buses.

The BUZ (Bus Upgrade Zones) routes are high-frequency express routes, pioneered by Brisbane City Council, that provide services on main corridors at least every 15 minutes on any day of the week from 6 am to 11:30 pm.

The Great Circle Line routes operate on a large anti-clockwise (route 598) and clockwise (route 599) loop around Brisbane's outer suburbs. They are used for travel between suburbs, particularly the larger shopping centres, without the need to travel through the CBD.

During peak hours, 'Rocket' buses bypass most intermediate stops, while 'Bullets' (such as the Browns Plains 142) do not stop between the CBD and their final destinations.

Buses often provide free transport between major shopping centres (for example Westfield Carindale), and The Gabba or Lang Park for sporting match events.

=== Ferries ===
Brisbane's ferries, and particularly its catamaran CityCats, are considered iconic to the city.

CityCat catamaran ferry

CityCat services operate from UQ St Lucia to Northshore Hamilton calling at West End, Guyatt Park, Regatta, Milton, North Quay, South Bank, QUT Gardens Point, Riverside, Howard Smith Wharves, Sydney Street, Mowbray Park, New Farm Park, Hawthorne, Bulimba, Teneriffe, Bretts Wharf and Apollo Road. Not all CityCat services stop all stops, with some peak time express services operating.

KittyCat services operate cross-river between the following locations:

- Bulimba – Teneriffe
- Sydney Street – Dockside
- Holman Street – Riverside
- Maritime Museum – QUT Gardens Point

=== Taxis ===
Three cab companies operate in Brisbane: Yellow Cabs (whose vehicles are painted orange), Black and White Cabs and 13cabs (2018). All three companies offer services under the same fare system (regulated by the Queensland government). They may pick up passengers from anywhere in the metropolitan and regional areas of Brisbane via casual or permanent bookings cab ranks. As well as standard taxis, both provide Maxi-Taxis designed to accommodate up to 10 people and with disability access. They also operate luxury vehicles (Silver Service for Yellow, Business Class for Black and White). All cabs now are also fitted with GPS tracking systems for driver location and have debit/credit card EFTPOS facilities.

=== Statistics ===
According to data released by Moovit in July 2017, the average amount of time people spend commuting with public transport in Brisbane & South East QLD, for example to and from work, on a weekday is 68 min. 22.6 percent of public transport riders ride for more than 2 hours every day. The average amount of time people wait at a stop or station for public transport is 13 min, while 18.7 percent of riders wait for over 20 minutes on average every day. The average distance people usually ride in a single trip with public transport is 9 km, while 20 percent travel for over 12 km in a single direction.

== Private transport ==
Brisbane's road system was planned around large, spacious suburban areas. Urban sprawl and over-reliance on cars predominate. Dense suburbs now rely on several main road corridors that split through and between these areas and provide the only link to the CBD and other areas of Brisbane. Logan Road, Moggill Road, Old Cleveland Road and Gympie Road are but a few of these multi-lane corridors that come out of the CBD and snake through the suburbs. As a result, traffic congestion has become a major problem and it was the promise of a new underground road system, nicknamed TransApex, that helped former Lord Mayor Campbell Newman win the 2004 local government election.

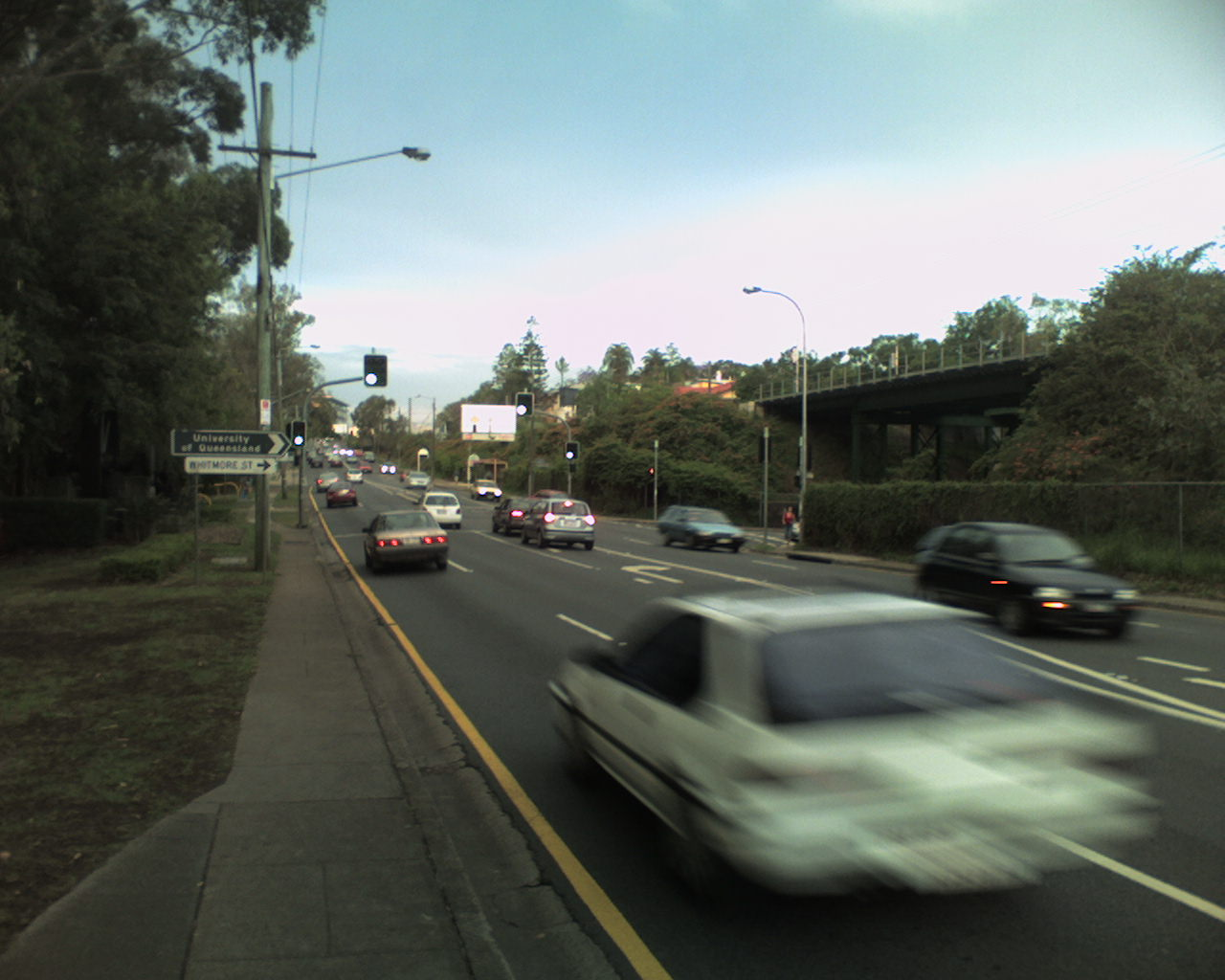
Moggill Road, Taringa

Bypasses such as the Inner City Bypass, Clem Jones Tunnel, and the Airport Link are intended to help to circulate traffic away from the inner-city areas and main roads via limited-access roads above the ground, and tunnels below that have higher speed limits and exits to particular suburbs. Existing high speed cross-suburban motorways such as the Western Freeway, Centenary Motorway, Pacific Motorway and Gateway Motorway provide alternative routes to main roads and connect up to main highways and other arterial roads. Other tunnels are also being planned to link all the various motorways in Brisbane together as part of TransApex, but only two have been scheduled for completion within the next decade.

Route signage is achieved by means of a system of Metroads, consisting of the most important arterial roads in metropolitan Brisbane including most motorways, and less important State Routes. Multiple freeways connect Brisbane to other cities, including the Pacific Motorway, the Bruce Highway and the Ipswich Motorway, all of which are part of the National Highway System. Brisbane is approximately 1,000 km away from Sydney, the closest major capital city.

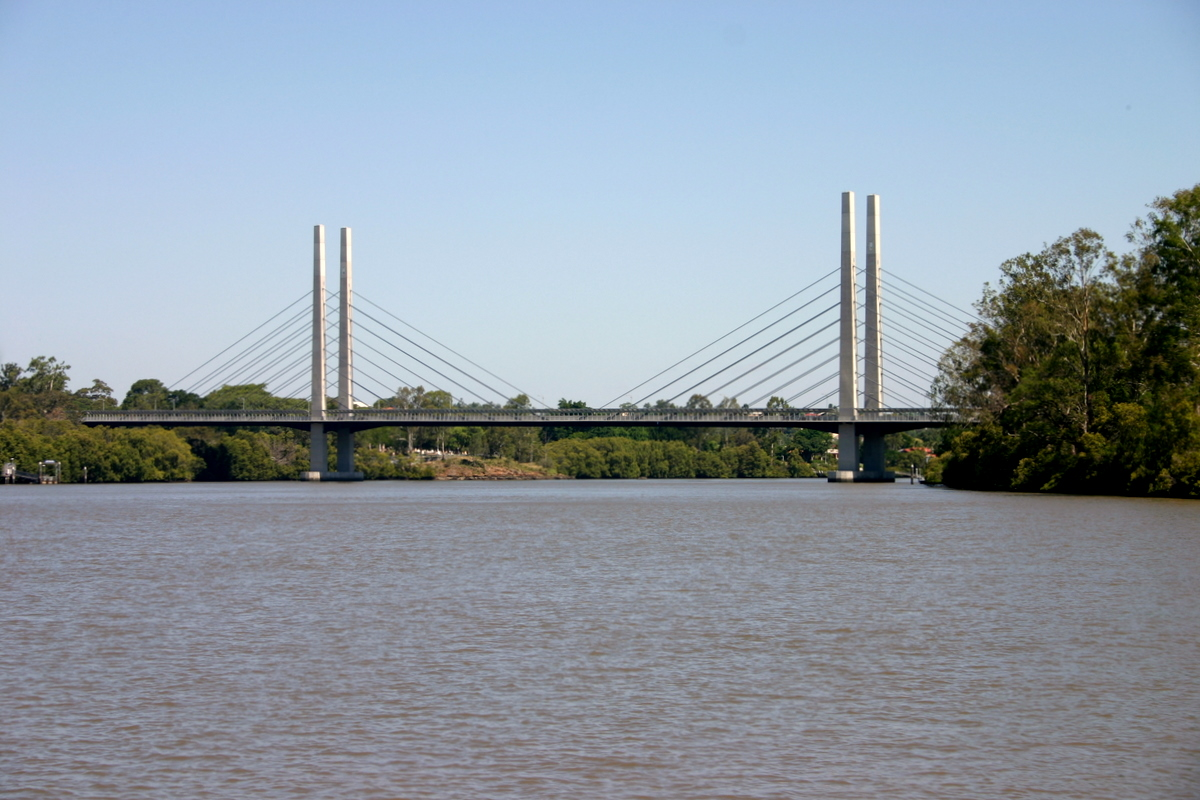
The Eleanor Schonell Bridge, a pesdestrian and bus bridge between Dutton Park and the University of Queensland's St Lucia campus

The Brisbane River creates a barrier to road transport routes. In total there are sixteen bridges over the river, mostly concentrated in the inner city area. The road bridges (which usually also include provision for pedestrians and cyclists) by distance from the river mouth are the Sir Leo Hielscher Bridges, the Story Bridge, the Captain Cook Bridge, the Victoria Bridge, the William Jolly Bridge, the Go Between Bridge, the Eleanor Schonell Bridge, the Walter Taylor Bridge the Centenary Bridge and Colleges Crossing. There are three railway bridges, namely the Merivale Bridge, the Albert Bridge and the Indooroopilly Railway Bridge. There are also three pedestrian only bridges: the Goodwill Bridge, the Kurilpa Bridge and the Jack Pesch Bridge.

The two bridges over Bramble Bay between Brighton and the Redcliffe Peninsula, name the Houghton Highway and Ted Smout Memorial Bridge are the longest bridges in the state.

== Airports ==
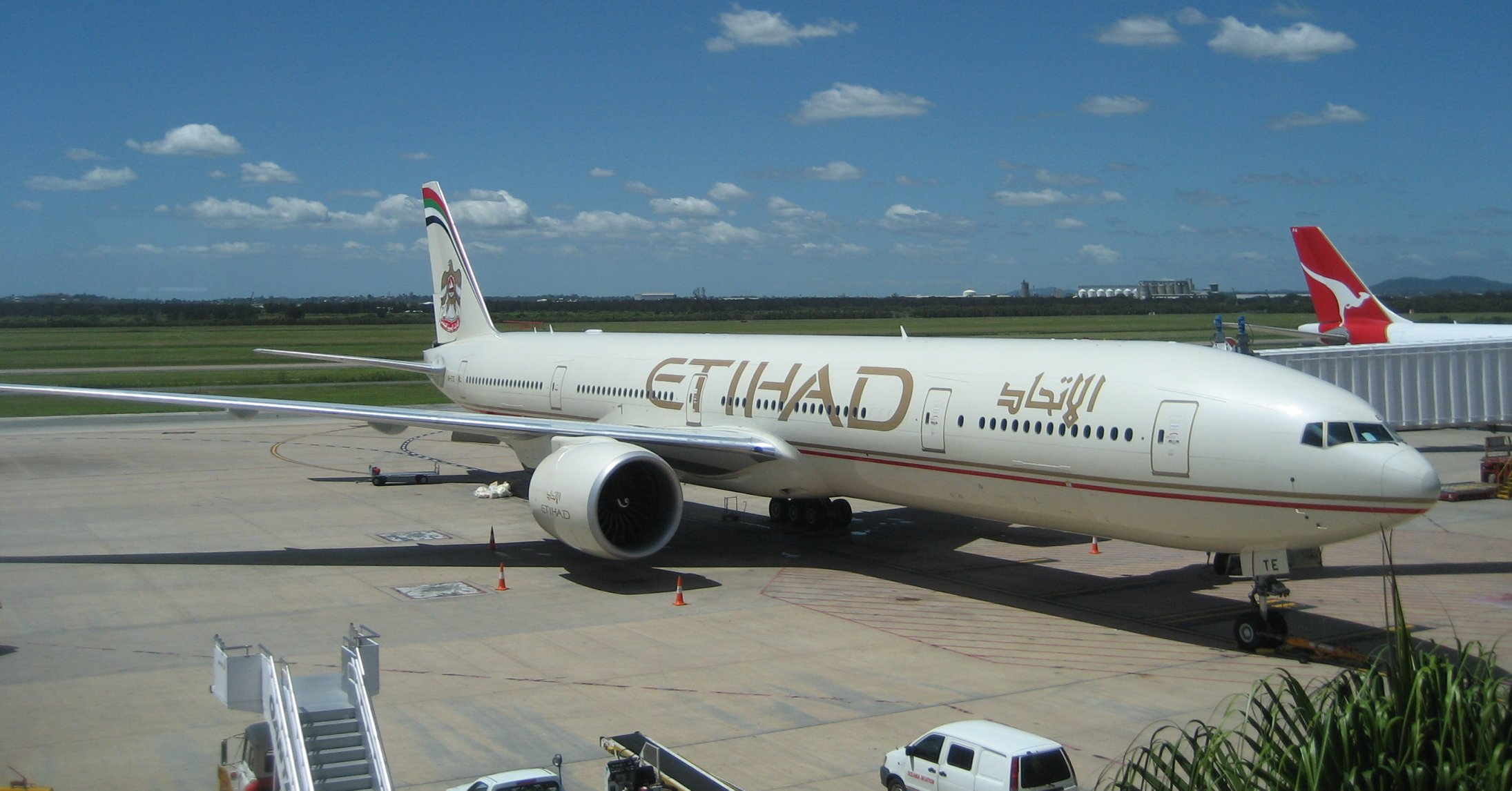
Etihad Airways Boeing 777 at the International Terminal at Brisbane Airport

Brisbane Airport, leased by the Brisbane Airport Corporation and located north-east of the city centre, is the biggest airport in Australia in terms of land size. Brisbane Airport is the third busiest airport in the country behind Sydney and Melbourne Airports respectively. Separated into domestic and international terminals, Brisbane Airport has frequent passenger and freight flights, providing direct flights to every capital city in Australia as well as many destinations in Asia, Oceania, and the Middle East. Virgin Australia, the second largest airline in Australia, is headquartered in Brisbane, while other major airlines Qantas and Jetstar both fly from Brisbane Airport.

The Airport railway line provides a link between the Domestic and International Terminals at Brisbane Airport and the city. The railway line takes approximately 20 minutes to travel from Central station to the Airport stations.

Archerfield Airport, located in Brisbane's southern suburbs, caters to general aviation. Other local airports can be found at Caboolture and Redcliffe.

== Seaports ==
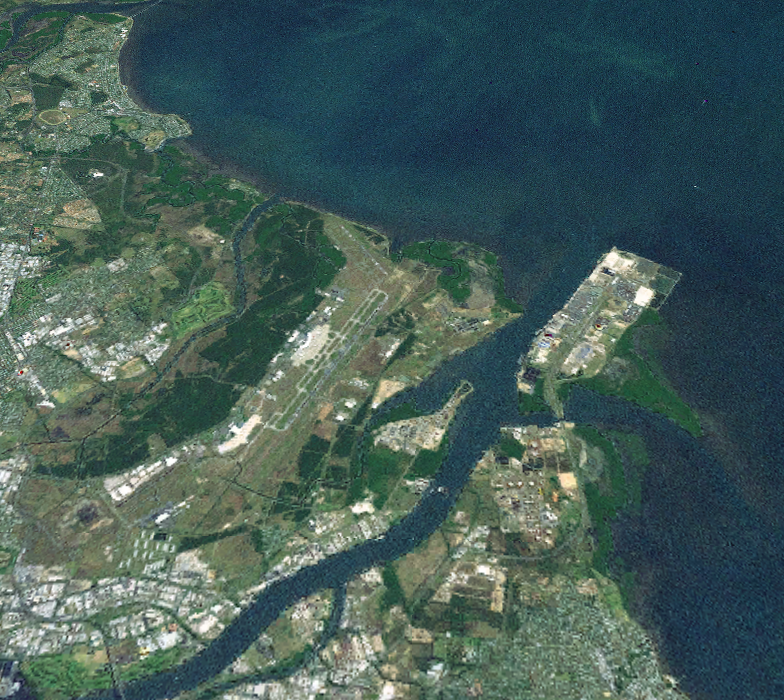
Brisbane's seaport, Port of Brisbane on Fisherman Island, and Brisbane Airport from space, Landsat montage

The Port of Brisbane is on the lower reaches of the Brisbane River and on Fisherman Island at the river's mouth; it is the third most important port in Australia for value of goods. Container freight, sugar, grain, coal and bulk liquids are the major exports. Most of the port facilities are less than three decades old, and some are built on reclaimed mangroves and wetlands. Historically, Brisbane's port facilities were located as far upstream as the central business district.

The economic region near the river's mouth including the port, airport and refineries is known as the Australia TradeCoast. Cruise ships are able to use an international cruise terminal at Luggage Point in Pinkenba.

== History ==
Historically Brisbane had a network of trolleybuses and trams, both of which were closed in 1969 in favour of an expanded bus fleet.

The Brisbane Tramways Trust experimented with providing bus services in the 1920s but these proved impractical due to mechanical unreliability and Brisbane's poor road surface quality. The first permanent bus services were introduced in 1940 as a supplement to Brisbane's tram services. In 1948 the council municipalised a number of privately run bus operators and expanded its own fleet of buses. The first tram lines to close were the Lower Edward Street to Gardens route, and the Upper Edward Street to Gregory Terrace route in 1947, the latter due to the very steep grades on that line. Diesel-engined buses initially replaced tram services on these lines, however these were replaced by trolleybuses on 12 August 1951.

The council also intended to introduce a trolleybus service to the new University of Queensland campus at St Lucia and purchased enough trolleybus chassis from the United Kingdom for the route. However, it was vigorously opposed by residents and the plan was abandoned. The council then found itself with surplus trolleybuses but no route on which to run them, so it decided to run the trolleybuses from Herston to Stanley Bridge, East Brisbane, commencing in 1952. Several other trolleybus routes were subsequently established in the eastern suburbs. The first of these replaced a tram route, along Cavendish Road, in 1955. Other trolleybus routes to Seven Hills and Carina did not involve tram route closures. The depot and workshops for the trolleybuses was located in Milton on Milton Road between Hale and Castlemaine Streets. The former depot was demolished to make way for the redeveloped Lang Park.

The tramway closure was notable for the speed with which it was carried out. Several hundred replacement buses were purchased from British vehicle manufacturer Leyland, at the time the largest single bus purchase in the world. The sudden acquisition of so many buses was to have repercussions in later years. Initially the Leyland Panther buses proved unreliable, and as a result, older front-engined mounted buses such as the Leyland Mk III Regals, dating from the 1940s, were retained well past their normal replacement date. Once the problems with the Panthers were ironed out, overall fleet numbers and maintenance requirements were reduced. Nevertheless, the fleet retained many older buses from the 1950s and early 1960s.

In 1975, the Whitlam Labor federal government made $80 million available to the Bjelke-Petersen National Party Queensland state government, intended to be passed on to Brisbane City Council for the purchase of new, replacement buses. The government refused to transfer the funds to the council, instead using the money to restore Parliament House and construct the Parliamentary Annexe building. As the replacement bus fleet aged, their maintenance requirements steadily increased, at a time when labour and spare parts costs had risen sharply. Further, as the tram replacement buses started to wear out at about the same time and needed replacement, the council was faced with another large capital outlay. Subsequently, in 1976, the council was able to negotiate federal funding, enabling them to purchase Volvo B59 buses, its first fleet acquisitions in seven years.

Patronage on the buses continued to decline, despite the best efforts of the Department of Transport hampered by rising fuel and labour costs, together with tightening budgets, leading to further cuts in services. An ageing bus fleet, some of which had been in service since the 1940s, made the service increasingly unattractive. A further hindrance was the council's own aggressively pro-car 1964 City Plan, requiring all developments to include car parking, but did not require the provision of any facilities that might advantage public transport. By the 1980s, the decline in patronage was halted, although costs continued to outstrip ticket revenue.

== Development ==
Brisbane's population growth has seen great strains placed upon South East Queensland's transport system. The State Government and Brisbane City Council have responded with infrastructure plans and increased funding for transportation projects, such as the South East Queensland Infrastructure Plan and Program. Most of the focus has been placed on expanding current road infrastructure, particularly tunnels and bypasses, as well as improving the public transport system. These include the creation of a new public transport mode, the Brisbane Metro; and expanding the current suburban rail network capacity with the Cross River Rail project.

== See also ==
- Rail transport in Queensland
- Bus transport in Queensland
- Transportation in Australia
