= Bulimba Reach =

Brisbane river section

Coordinates: 27.449°S 153.05°E

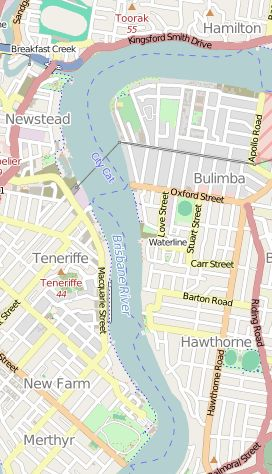
OpenStreetMap - Bulimba Reach, 2015

Bulimba Reach is a reach of the Brisbane River in Brisbane, Queensland, Australia.

== Geography ==
Bulimba Reach flows from south (upstream) to north (downstream). The suburbs of Hawthorne and Bulimba are on its eastern bank. The suburbs of New Farm, Teneriffe and Newstead lie to the west. Breakfast Creek joins the Brisbane River from the north-east at the northern end of Bulimba Reach.

== History ==
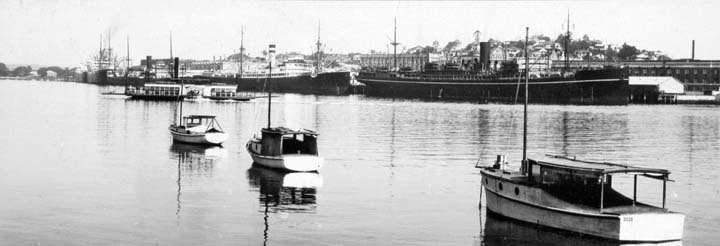
International shipping in Bulimba Reach, circa 1932

The Bulimba Branch railway line was built in 1897 to support the wharves and industries located on the western bank of the Bulimba Reach in Newstead, Teneriffe and New Farm.

Former wharves in the Bulimba Reach include:

- Brisbane Stevedoring Company wharf (western bank)
- Dalgety's Wharf (western bank)
- Mercantile Wharf (western bank)

== Transport ==
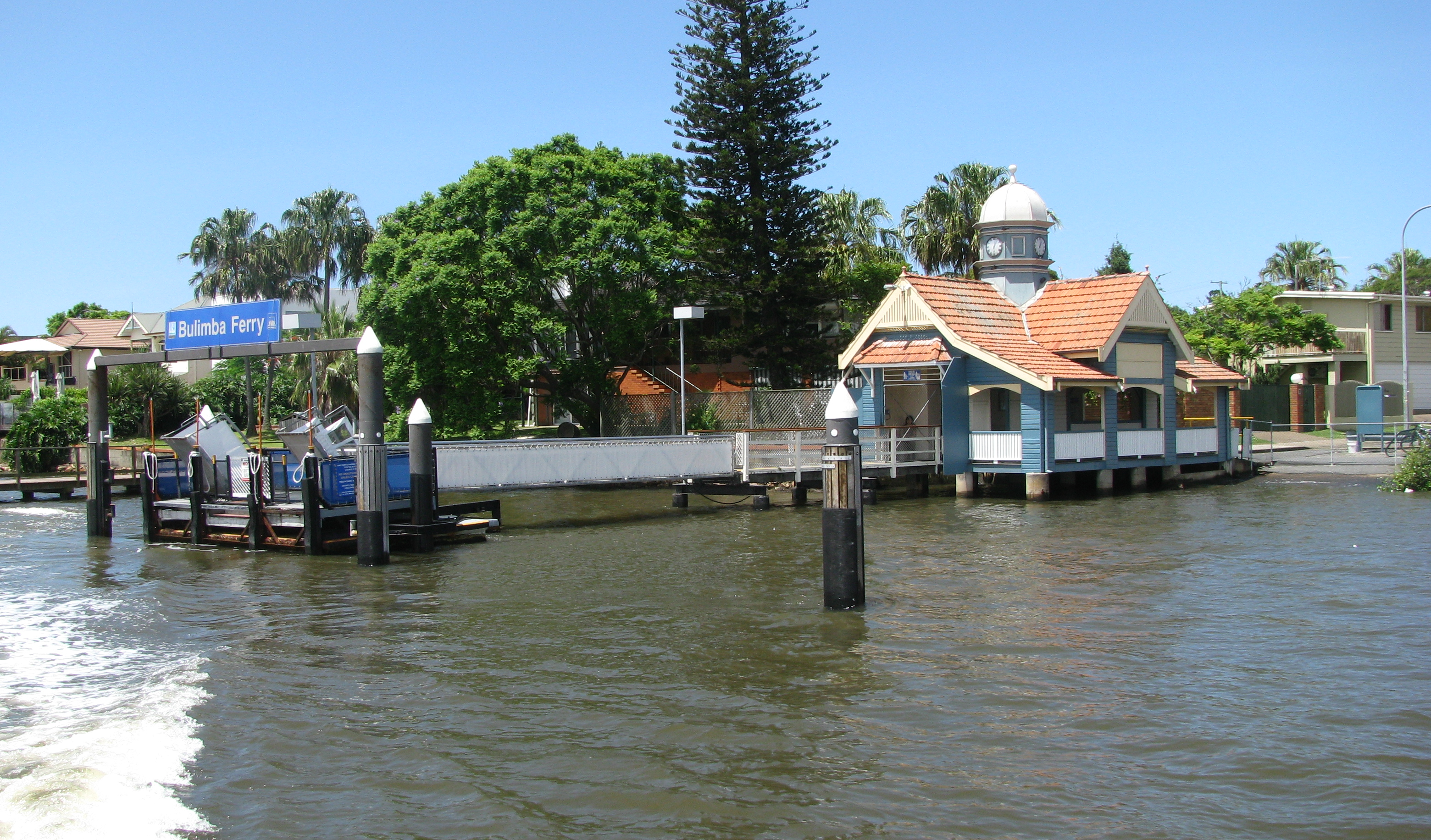
Bulimba ferry wharf, 2010

There are three ferry terminals on Bulimba Reach (from upstream to downstream):

- Hawthorne ferry wharf (eastern bank)
- Teneriffe ferry wharf (western bank)
- Bulimba ferry wharf (eastern bank)

The CityCat services all of these ferry terminals along the Brisbane River. A cross-river ferry service also operates between Bulimba and Hawthorne ferry wharves.

== Landmarks ==
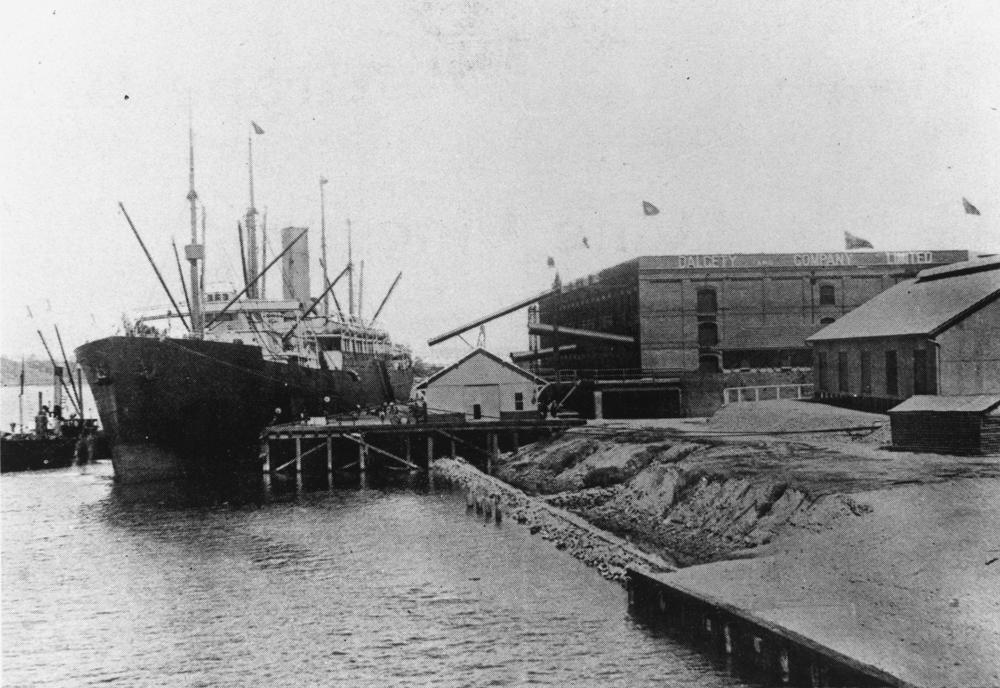
Cargo ship Pericles at Dalgety and Co's Wharf, New Farm, Brisbane, 1908

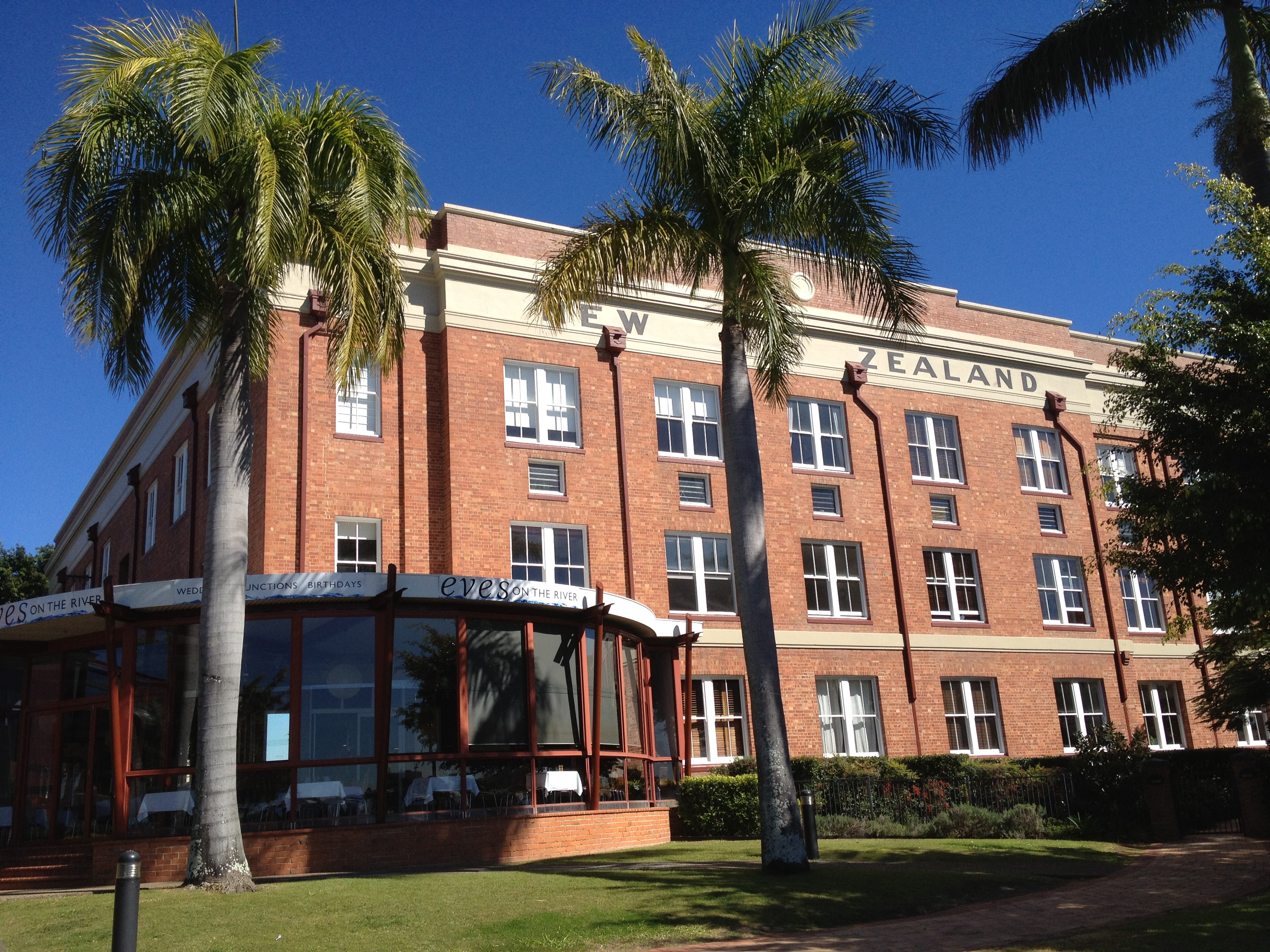
Mactaggarts Woolstore, viewed from the river, 2012

There are many landmarks along the Bulimba Reach, including (from upstream to downstream):

- the heritage-listed Brisbane Powerhouse, New Farm (western bank)
- Lourdes Hill College, Hawthorne (eastern bank)
- the heritage-listed former CSR Refinery, New Farm (western bank)
- the heritage-listed house Amity, New Farm (western bank)
- the heritage-listed Australian Estates No. 2 Store, Teneriffe (western bank)
- the heritage-listed Hawthorne ferry wharf, Hawthorne (eastern bank)
- the heritage-listed former Mactaggarts Woolstore, Teneriffe (eastern bank)
- the heritage-listed Newstead Air Raid Shelter (western bank)
- the heritage-listed Bulimba ferry wharf (eastern bank)
- the heritage-listed Newstead House within Newstead Park (western bank)

Historically there were many wharves in the Teneriffe area and there remain a large number of associated warehouses on Macquarie Street which faced the river along the Bulimba Reach. However, urban renewal projects have replaced the wharves with residential apartments and those warehouses are now separated from the river. Similarly on the western bank, the heritage-listed Bulimba House once occupied all the land down to the riverfront at the Bulimba Reach, but subdivision of the estate over the years has resulted in Bulimba House no longer being a riverbank property.
