= HMAS Moreton =

Royal Australian Navy base

- Brisbane, Queensland in Australia

Site information
- Type: Naval base
- Owner: Department of Defence
- Operator: Royal Australian Navy
- Website: navy.gov.au/establishments/hmas-moreton

Location
- Location in Queensland
- Coordinates: 27°27′00″S 153°03′30″E

Site history
- Built: 1932
- In use: 1932 – 1994; 2016 – present

Garrison information
- Current commander: Commander Mark McConnell, RAN
- Occupants: Royal Australian Navy Band Queensland; Dive Team Eight; Australian Naval Cadet Headquarters; ANC TS Gayundah; AAC 12 ACU

HMAS Moreton is a Royal Australian Navy (RAN) base located in Bulimba, Brisbane, Queensland, Australia, responsible for providing administrative support to RAN personnel and visiting warships. It was originally established as a naval base located at New Farm, Brisbane in 1932, and was decommissioned in 1994; and recommissioned in 2016.

== History ==
The naval base was opened in 1932 as HMAS Penguin IV and on 1 August 1940 it was renamed as HMAS Brisbane. The base was again renamed HMAS Moreton in 1942. The base was located at the corner of Merthyr Road and Gray Street, in New Farm, Brisbane and had its own wharves, warehouse buildings and assembly areas.

Post Vietnam the base was home to the Royal Australian Navy's amphibious forces including HMAS Tobruk and the Balikpapan-class landing craft. For much of this time much of the army's amphibious capacity was based locally. Gallipoli Barracks based 6th Battalion, Royal Australian Regiment was Australia's lead amphibious assault unit whilst 35 Water Transport Squadron was based at Bulimba Barracks, Brisbane, Queensland with LCM.

HMAS Moreton was decommissioned in 1994 and the site at Bulimba Army Barracks subsequently identified following the transfer north of an Army Water Transport Squadron. Given the need to maintain a Senior naval Officer in Brisbane, a small team were established in support of that role, the SE Qld Naval Band, the RAN Diving Team Eight and the Naval Reserve Cadets with the services relocated to Bulimba Barracks under the authority of Naval Headquarters Southern Queensland. Naval amphibious forces are currently based at HMAS Kuttabul.

The site of the former base has been transformed into residential apartments. Two historic buildings associated with the base, the Commonwealth Acetate of Lime Factory and Amity, are listed on the Queensland Heritage Register.

As part of the partial disposal of Bulimba Barracks, Naval Headquarters Southern Queensland was renamed HMAS Moreton on 14 May 2016. At this time the establishment was staffed by a small number of personnel.

== Future ==
With the selling of the former Bulimba Army Barracks Moreton established a new gatehouse on Taylor Street with improved security including CCTV. Construction Of additional building in support of navy and other defense activities have since been added.

== See also ==
- List of Royal Australian Navy bases
