= Hawthorne ferry wharf =

Hawthorne
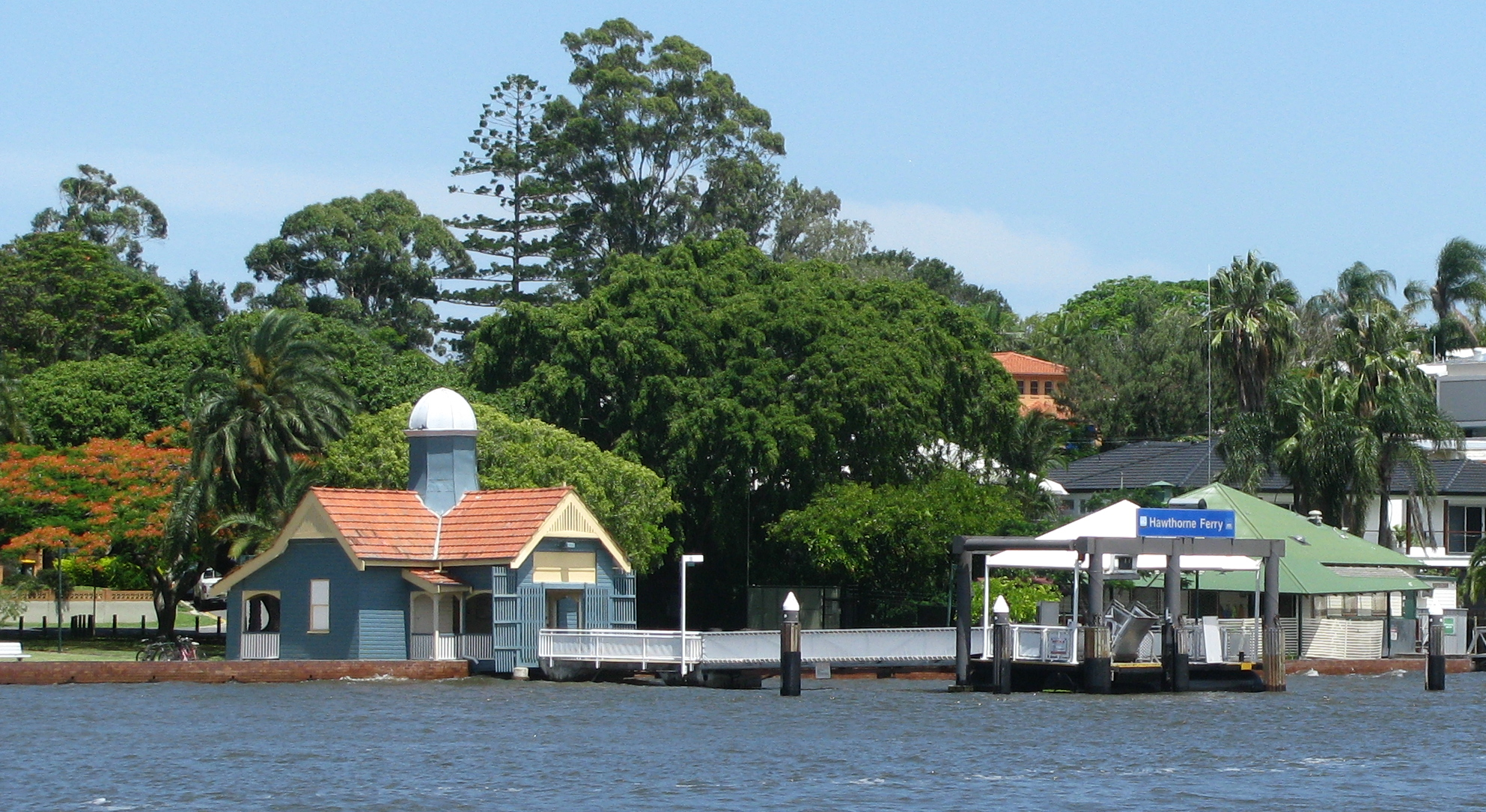

General information
- Location: Gordon Street, Hawthorne
- Coordinates: 27.4616°S 153.0535°E
- Owner: Brisbane City Council
- Operator: RiverCity Ferries
- Platforms: 1

Construction
- Accessible: Yes

Other information
- Station code: 317583
- Fare zone: go card 1

History
- Opened: 1925

Services
Preceding wharf	RiverCity Ferries	Following wharf
New Farm Park towards UQ St Lucia	CityCat	Bulimba towards Northshore Hamilton
Location

Hawthorne ferry wharf
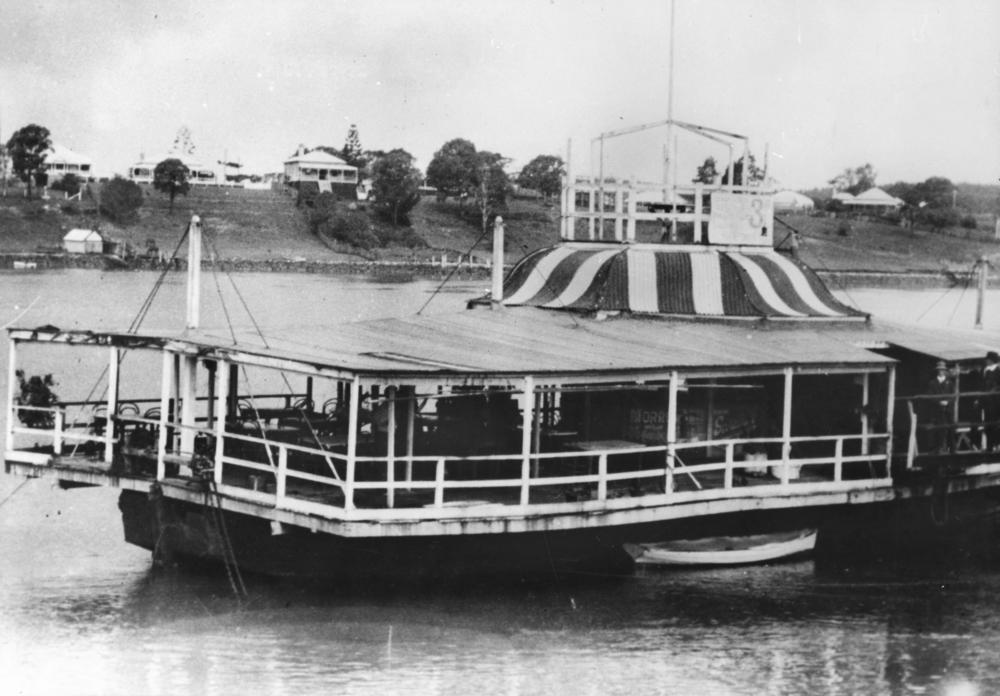
- Hawthorne ferry wharf, 1913

- Location within Queensland Location within Australia
- 27.4608°S 153.0538°E
- Location: Gordon Street, Hawthorne, Queensland, Australia

History
- Design period: 1919–1930s (interwar period)
- Built: 1924–1925

Site notes
- Architect(s): George Henry Male Addison & Son
- Architectural style: Arts & Crafts

Queensland Heritage Register
- Official name: Hawthorne Ferry Terminal & Hardcastle Park
- Type: state heritage (landscape, built)
- Designated: 24 January 2003
- Reference no.: 602212
- Significant period: 1920s (historical); 1925–ongoing (social)
- Significant components: archway, jetty/pier, waiting shed, pontoon, trees/plantings, views from, gate – entrance, bench/seat, views to, tower – clock, park / green space, seating, shed – shelter, wall/s – retaining

Hawthorne ferry wharf is a heritage-listed ferry wharf located on the southern side of the Brisbane River serving the Brisbane suburb of Hawthorne in Queensland, Australia. It is served by RiverCity Ferries' CityCat services. It was added to the Queensland Heritage Register in 2003.

== History ==
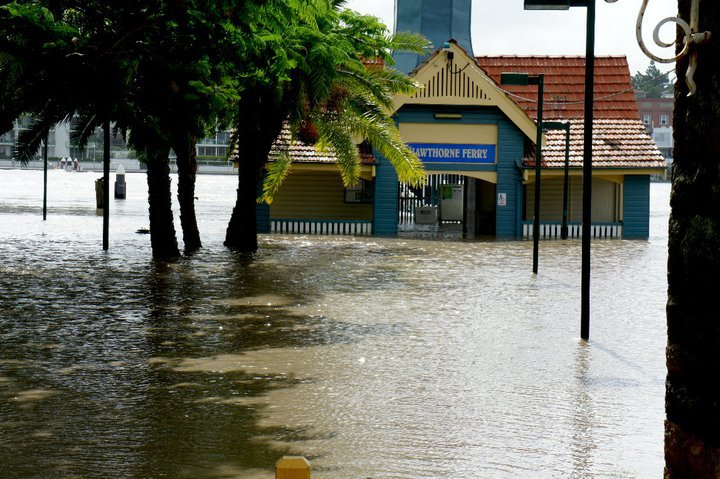
Hawthorne ferry terminal flooded in 2011

Hawthorne ferry wharf was built in 1925 by the Brisbane City Council to a design prepared earlier for the Balmoral Shire Council previously responsible for the efficient servicing of several ferry routes across the Brisbane River.

Since the days of the convict settlement at Moreton Bay when a punt was poled between the main settlement and the south bank of the river, ferries have been a vital transport facility for Brisbane. The river twists and loops through the city and cross-river access is important in linking city and suburbs and greatly reducing travel time between them. Although the first bridge linked the city and South Brisbane in 1862, no other bridges were built for many years, public transport was limited and few people had private transport until after World War II. People who needed to commute to work and to access shopping and entertainment facilities used cross-river ferries on a daily basis. Ferries were the only major transport service provided by metropolitan local authorities as responsibility for care and management had been placed in their hands by an 1858 Act.

In November 1844 the first ferry service commenced between Customs House and Kangaroo Point and in 1850 Samuel and Matthew Buckley operated a rowing boat ferry service at Bulimba. In 1888 Bulimba and Hawthorne were included in the area for which the Balmoral Divisional Board was responsible. Balmoral Shire was created in 1901 and was responsible for Apollo, Bulimba, Norman Park and Hawthorne ferries. A special sub-committee was responsible for the provision of boats, buildings and landings and fixed fares. In 1921 the Balmoral council decided to replace the existing waiting sheds and landing at Bulimba with a substantial ferry house to shelter waiting passengers. In 1922 they commissioned a ferry house design from the prominent architectural firm of George Henry Male Addison & Son. Construction was underway by August 1922.

The design for the proposed Bulimba building appeared in the December 1922 edition of the Architects and Builders Journal of Queensland, however, as George Henry Addison died in February 1922 following a protracted illness, the design was most likely by his son George Frederick Addison. The quality of the building and the choice of a noted firm of architects for the design attest to the importance of the ferry in the life of the community.

George Henry Male Addison was Welsh born and trained in England. He immigrated to Adelaide in 1883 and then moved to Melbourne. He was an artist as well as an architect and was one of the founders of Melbourne Art Society. He moved to Brisbane in 1886 as local partner of Terry, Oakden & Addison. Addison won prizes for both architectural design and fine arts and served on a number of important committees and advisory panels connected with both. In late 1892 he set up in practice on his own, forming a partnership with Leslie Corrie in 1898. The firm designed many major buildings including churches, banks and commercial buildings. From 1919 he was in practice with his son, George Frederick Addison as G Addison and Son. George Addison studied at Brisbane Central Technical College and was articled to his father. Apart from his military service in World War I, he practiced as an architect until 1940.

In 1924 the Balmoral Council called tenders for a second ferry house, to a slightly modified version of the Bulimba design, to be erected at the Hawthorne ferry terminal. The original design was rotated and a central gabled entry added on the river side, making the building cruciform in plan and accommodating two small rooms in the arms of the structure. The modification follows the style of the original and allows the two terminals to be seen from the river as a pair. It is not known if Hawthorne ferry terminal was designed by Addison or adapted from the plan for Bulimba by others. The ferry terminal is directly opposite the large complex of wool stores and wharves at Teneriffe, so that the ferry carried many people to and from work.

In 1925 the various Brisbane district councils amalgamated into a single local government authority, the Brisbane City Council, and construction of ferry terminals because their responsibility. In October 1925 the contract for the new waiting shed at Hawthorne was let for the original design, though other Brisbane City Council terminal buildings were less ornamental. Of the other ferry terminal buildings on the Brisbane River, most were built much later and none are as ornate as the Brisbane and Hawthorne ferry houses.

In 1939 the area around the Hawthorne ferry terminal was generally known as Hawthorne Ferry Park, but the local residents applied to the Brisbane City Council to have it named in memory of SWB Hardcastle, a well-known and highly regarded Hawthorne resident who had lived near the park. It was suggested that if Council supplied the stone, the residents would pay for a memorial in the form of an entrance arch. An area of over an acre was converted from freehold land for this purpose and a stone and metal arch bearing the name of the park was erected at its entrance.

The ferry terminal retains its original function and is generally very intact, although alterations to the tower included removal of clock faces set on the north and west.

The wharf sustained minor damage during the January 2011 Brisbane floods. It reopened after repairs on 14 February 2011.

== Description ==
The Hawthorne Ferry House is on the bank of the Brisbane River in Hardcastle Park facing the former wool store complex at Teneriffe across the river. It is approached from the riverside by a pontoon and from the landward side by a pathway and entrance leading into a covered waiting area.

Hardcastle Park is a level open area running along the riverbank at Gordon Street, Hawthorne. The park is lightly treed so that the ferry house is visually prominent from the road. The park is entered through an archway composed of two stone pillars supporting a metal arch forming the name of the park. A path edged with Brisbane tuff (porphyry) kerbstones leads from the entrance to the ferry house. This, is an open timber-framed structure set on stumps and clad with weatherboards. It is cruciform in plan and the crossing of the intersecting gables of the terracotta-tiled roof is topped with a low tower and cupola clad in flat sheet metal. The gable ends have decorative timberwork and paired brackets.

The sides of the building to the river and land entry are open and have timber balustrades and corner posts. Those to the north and south have small rooms set on either side of the central passageway. The interior has a timber floor and ceiling and there are timber bench seats against the walls.

== Heritage listing ==
Hawthorne Ferry Terminal & Hardcastle Park was listed on the Queensland Heritage Register on 24 January 2003 having satisfied the following criteria.

The place is important in demonstrating the evolution or pattern of Queensland's history.

The Hawthorne Ferry terminal is important as one of a pair of intact purpose-built ferry terminals from the first part of the 20th century. As with the Bulimba ferry wharf, its quality of design and detail demonstrates the importance of ferries in the development of Brisbane before a network of bridges and public transport was fully developed and before many people owned cars. The ferry terminals are also evidence for the workings of the Balmoral Shire Council before the Brisbane suburban councils were amalgamated in 1925.

The place demonstrates rare, uncommon or endangered aspects of Queensland's cultural heritage.

The Hawthorne and Bulimba Ferry terminals were the largest ever built to service Brisbane ferries and are now rare as early examples of their type, as most Brisbane River ferry terminals are now served by modern buildings.

The place is important in demonstrating the principal characteristics of a particular class of cultural places.

The Hawthorne Ferry terminal not only illustrates the architectural details of the Federation Queen Anne style as applied to a small scale building, but also those features typical of ferry terminals comprising a pontoon for river access, a landing area and covered waiting area for passengers.

The Hawthorne Ferry terminal is significant as a creative example of the later work of the prominent Queensland architectural firm of GMH Addison and Son who are generally known for larger buildings.

The place is important because of its aesthetic significance.

The Hawthorne ferry house has considerable aesthetic significance as a small timber public building that exhibits a high standard of design. Domestic scale and details have been imaginatively applied to a wharf building of mundane function. The aesthetic qualities of the ferry house are greatly enhanced by the trees and open green space of Hardcastle Park in which it is set. The park with its ferry house and entrance archway building is a landmark both from the water and from the landward side.

The place has a strong or special association with a particular community or cultural group for social, cultural or spiritual reasons.

The Hawthorne Ferry terminal in its park setting has a long association with the residents of the area as a building often used on a daily basis and as a local landmark that makes an important contribution to the character of the area. The commemorative archway to Hardcastle Park was erected at the behest of Hawthorne residents.
