= Bulimba Branch railway line =

Bulimba Branch

Overview
- Status: dismantled

History
- Commenced: October 1896
- Opened: 16 December 1897
- Closed: 30 April 1990

Technical
- Line length: 3.8 km (2.4 mi)
- Track gauge: 3 ft 6 in (1,067 mm)

The Bulimba Branch railway line was a branch line off the North Coast railway line in the inner northern suburbs of Brisbane, Australia. It opened on 16 December 1897 to serve the wharves and industries along the western bank of the Bulimba Reach of the Brisbane River at Newstead and Bulimba (which at the time straddled both sides of the Brisbane River). Even after the parts of Bulimba on the northern side of the river became the suburbs of Teneriffe and New Farm, it continued to be known as the Bulimba Branch until closure in 1990.

== Route ==
The branch ran from a junction at Brunswick Street station and ran parallel to the North Coast line to near the original site of Bowen Hills railway station. A junction known as Bulimba Junction at the south end of Bowen Hills was added in 1914. It ran 3.8 kilometres (2.4 miles) to the Brisbane City Council Power House Siding, serving 23 industries and wharves along the way (increasing to 24 in 1913 and 27 in 1950).

== Closure ==
Newstead Wharves were closed in 1977 and the sidings removed. Brown and Broad Siding was removed in 1980. The line was closed south of Commercial Road on 1 November 1989 and the remainder back to Bulimba Junction closed on 30 April 1990.
