= Amity, New Farm =

Amity
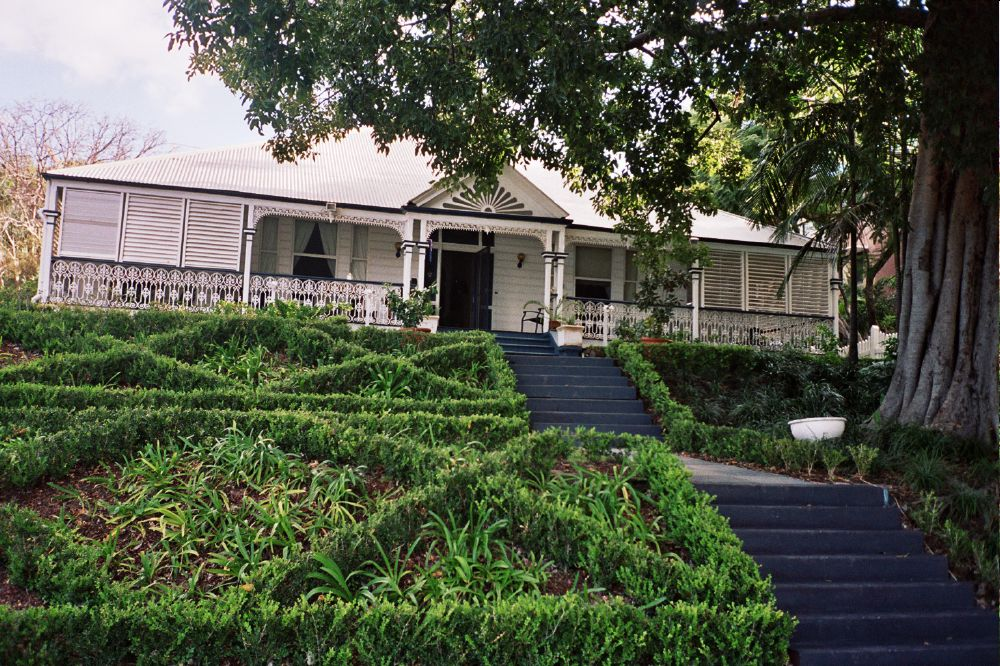
- Amity, 2004

- Location within Queensland Location within Australia
- 27.4639°S 153.0512°E
- Location: 101 Welsby Street, New Farm, City of Brisbane, Queensland, Australia

History
- Design period: 1870s–1890s (late 19th century)
- Built: 1892–c. 1900
- Built for: Thomas Welsby

Site notes
- Architectural styles: Victorian Filigree, Queenslander

Queensland Heritage Register
- Official name: Amity
- Type: state heritage (landscape, built)
- Designated: 21 October 1992
- Reference no.: 600264
- Significant period: 1892–1941 (fabric); 1890s–1940s, 1980–1994 (historical)
- Significant components: garden/grounds, kitchen/kitchen house, basement / sub-floor, lead light/s, fence/wall – perimeter, flood marker, gate – entrance, terracing, garden edging/balustrades/planter boxes, garage, paving, residential accommodation – main house, views to, views from, flagpole/flagstaff

Amity is a heritage-listed detached house at 101 Welsby Street, New Farm, City of Brisbane, Queensland, Australia. It was built from 1892 to c. 1900. It was added to the Queensland Heritage Register on 21 October 1992.

== History ==
Amity is a single-storeyed timber residence fronting the Bulimba Reach of the Brisbane River at New Farm. The house was built in 1892 for Thomas Welsby (1858–1941), a prominent Brisbane businessman, politician, historian and sportsman.

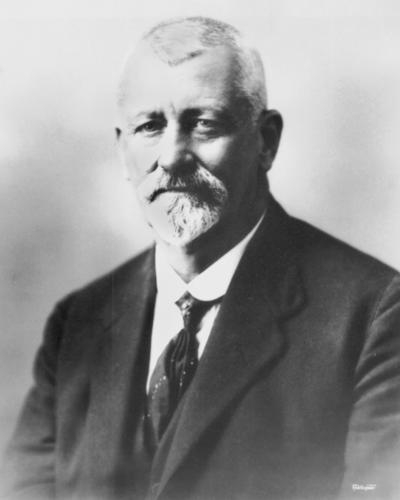
Thomas Welsby, 1900

Thomas Welsby was born at Ipswich in November 1858 and educated at John Scott's School in Ipswich and Ipswich Boys Grammar School. He worked for the Bank of New South Wales and Australian Joint Stock Bank in Brisbane before leaving to practise as a public accountant, trustee and auditor in 1884. He became a member of the Brisbane Stock Exchange, operated a shipping partnership and audited the Brisbane Municipal Council accounts in 1893.

He was a member of the Booroodabin Divisional Board in 1893–1902 (chairman 1897–1900), and chairman of the New Farm State School committee in 1899–1908. He was instrumental in the formation of the Engineering Supply Company of Australia in 1903, was a director of the Royal Bank of Queensland, and had interests with Sir Robert Philp (Premier of Queensland 1899–1903 and 1907–08) in mining and with GC Willocks, a railway contractor. Welsby was also a trustee for the Mount Garnet railway debentureholders (1901–15), and chairman of Queensland Brewery Ltd (1907–19).

He stood unsuccessfully for the Queensland Legislative Assembly as a candidate for Fortitude Valley in the 1899, 1902 and 1909 Queensland elections. As a Ministerialist he won North Brisbane in 1911 and held Merthyr from 1912 to 1915. Nicknamed "Bung Bung", he generally disliked parliamentary life.

Welsby loved history and sport. He was foundation honorary treasurer (1913), president (1936–37) and vice-president (1917–36, 1937–41) of the Historical Society of Queensland. He advocated that government subsidise the society to collect Queensland's early records, and he bequeathed his large library to the society and his portrait hangs over the entrance. Welsby also wrote seven books about the history of the Moreton Bay region.

In 1882 Welsby had been manager and half-back for Queensland's first intercolonial Rugby Union team which played in Sydney. He helped to revive the code in 1928, was a life member of the Queensland Rugby Union (president 1929–39) and donated the Welsby Cup. He was foundation secretary of the Brisbane Gymnasium in 1882, sponsored boxing matches and formed the Queensland Amateur Boxing and Wrestling Union in 1909. Welsby had a house at Amity on Stradbroke Island and was patron of the Amateur Fishing Society from 1916. He was also a founding member of the Royal Queensland Yacht Club in 1885, later being commodore in 1903–19.

Welsby also collected flora and fauna, historical letters and manuscripts, rare editions of early colonial authors and charts prepared by early explorers. The figurehead and smoking chair from the government steam yacht, the Lucinda, were also among his prized possessions. The Lucinda was the vessel on which the Draft Constitution of Australia was signed.

Welsby married Margaret Gilchrist Kingston in February 1893. They had two daughters, a son, and a young Torres Strait Islands girl named Jane whom they had fostered. Their son died in 1902 aged two months, and Margaret died the following year from tuberculosis. Jane was later Welsby's housekeeper and remained with him until his death in February 1941 at Amity.

The land on which Amity stands had been alienated from the crown by Thomas Adams on 10 January 1845. Of this land, section 9 of Subdivision A of eastern suburban allotment 22 was acquired by eight Brisbane men on 17 January 1887 and mortgaged to Peter Nicol Russel. This land was sold to the Federal Building Land and Investment Society Ltd on 28 January 1889, and then subdivided. On 15 March 1889 Welsby purchased sub 130 from the Society to whom he then mortgaged the property. Thomas Augustine Ryan purchased subs 131 and 132 on 13 March 1889, and sold sub 131 to Welsby on 22 December 1891. Welsby then mortgaged subs 130 and 131 to the London Chartered Bank of Australia and built Amity. Both allotments were transferred to Margaret Gilchrist Welsby on 2 May 1895. Sub 132 was purchased by Margaret Gilchrist Welsby from Ryan on 12 February 1897. On Margaret's death, the whole property was transmitted to Thomas Welsby as trustee on 28 May 1903.

Amity was constructed by Welsby just prior to his marriage, and for the rest of his life was his only Brisbane residence. Prior to the construction of Amity, Welsby had been living with his mother at Clairvue in Bowen Terrace, New Farm. In his memoirs, architects and builders, including the Stanleys and Petries, show up among Welsby's close circle of friends. No tender notice for the construction of the house is to be found in Brisbane newspapers of the time, and it may well have been built by someone he knew. Welsby moved into the house in December 1892, and in February 1893 endured the disastrous flood which came within 8 inches (200 mm) of the verandah flooring. Welsby marked the height of the flood on the entrance stairs, and the marker still survives.

Amity was built with its entrance to Roberts Street, but by 1907 this was named Welsby Street. By this time the railway line to the nearby sugar refinery was in place to the south of Forrest Street on Amity's southern boundary. On 14 February 1910 a Deed of Grant was issued to Welsby in trust for allotment 1 of section 65, which adjoined the southern boundary of the property, in place of Forrest Street. A new Certificate of Title was issued for the whole of the land to Welsby as Trustee under Margaret's will.

By the early 1900s, Amity's original design, consisting of a variation of a four-room house with encircling verandahs and a kitchen wing at the rear, had become too small for the family. An extension was built at the rear, replacing the rear verandah with bedrooms, a bathroom, a large central room and incorporating the original kitchen wing. The date of this extension is unknown, but it had been completed by 1925 when a drainage survey plan was drawn. This plan also shows a fern house against the eastern verandah and a jetty in the river.

In 1919 Welsby was approached by his neighbour William Ruddle senior to enter into a deal with an English company wanting to purchase both residential properties and the street between them as the site for a wharf. The total offer for both properties was £35,000 of which £15,000 was for Amity. This was an enormous offer as Amity was valued at £3,000 22 years later, however no sale eventuated.

The whole of land was transferred to Welsby's daughters Marion Clark and Hannah Welsby in equal shares on 18 November 1932, and Marion became sole owner on 5 October 1948.

Welsby left his mark on the house in a number of ways, including the orientation of the house to the river, the terraced gardens to the river's edge, his initials in the leadlight sidelights of the entrance, and the name Amity in the leadlight fanlight. Other elements include the coral garden bed edging, compass points marked in the front concrete path, and the 1893 flood marker on the entrance stairs. A river front rotunda and baths had been constructed prior to 1925, and were destroyed during the 1974 floods.

After Welsby's death in 1941, Jane continued to live at Amity for another 14 months before she moved to Windsor. The property was let for several years until Marion bought Hannah's half share and with her husband James C Clark returned to Amity. Their son James W Clark also lived at Amity for a few years after his return from the Second World War, and built the corrugated iron garage that still stands in the rear garden. James C Clark died in 1948, and his son moved out when he married in 1950. By this time Amity, with the exception of The Hollins next door which was part of the Colonial Sugar Refining Company Ltd refinery, had been separated from the residential part of New Farm by increasing industry. This included the introduction of the railway line through to the refinery, and the erection of the naval base just downstream by the Royal Australian Navy during the Second World War.

On 30 June 1952, Amity was purchased by the Colonial Sugar Refining Company and Marion Clark built a house at Hamilton. The company let the house to several tenants and it was used for some years as the refinery manager's residence including the family of CSR Refinery Manager Arthur Graham in the mid to late 1970s. The removal of folding doors between the living and dining areas probably occurred in the 1950s or 1960s when one of the CSR families occupied the premises.

Amity was let as a naval residence for the adjoining HMAS Moreton. On 7 July 1980 the refinery, now CSR Ltd, transferred subs 130–132 which were purchased by the Commonwealth of Australia on 31 July 1980 for use as the residence of the Officer Commanding, Queensland Region, Royal Australian Navy. The river end of Welsby Street was closed and incorporated into HMAS Moreton. HMAS Moreton closed in 1994 and Amity is currently used as the residence of the Officer in Charge of the Naval Support Office, South Queensland.

The Hollins, to the southeast of Amity, was removed from its site and relocated to Pullenvale in 1988. Amity is now the last surviving nineteenth century timber riverfront residence at New Farm.

In 1997, Amity was purchased by Brisbane architect Tony Dempsey. In 2006, Dempsey sought approval to construct a six-storey apartment block in Amity's backyard. Although that proposal was rejected in 2008, Dempsey sought approval for a four-storey development in 2011.

In April 2023, the house was bought by Adam Beswick, the managing director of mining equipment businesses M2P Engineering, for $20.5 million, then the most expensive house sale in Brisbane's history.

== Description ==
Amity is built fronting the Bulimba Reach of the Brisbane River to the northeast, with access from Welsby Street to the northwest. It is a single-storeyed chamferboard residence with timber stumps and a hipped corrugated iron roof with cast iron ridge cresting. The building has verandahs to three sides fronting the river, and a later addition at the rear which has sub-floor laundry and car accommodation.

The building is symmetrical to the river frontage, with a central entry which has a slightly projecting gable with a decorative timber fretwork panel, timber finial and paired timber posts. Entrance steps have a marker indicating the level of the 1893 flood. Verandahs have cast iron railings and valance, raked boarded ceilings, chamfered timber posts, and adjustable timber louvred panels fixed above railings at verandah corners and along the Welsby Street frontage. Wide step-out sash windows, flanked by narrow sashes, open onto the verandahs from principal rooms, and a lattice screen panel, with door, divides the northwest verandah.

The rear of the building, consisting of a later addition which incorporates the original kitchen wing, has a corrugated iron half-gabled roof, timber batten skirt between stumps, sash windows with hoods, and a large panel of hopper windows with leadlight panels above to the southwest wall.

Internally, the front section of the house has a central hall with the northeast main entry consisting of a panelled timber door with leadlight sidelights and fanlight. The sidelights feature Thomas Welsby's initials TW entwined, with the fanlight featuring the name AMITY. Similar door, sidelights and fanlight are located at the rear of the hall, originally opening to the rear verandah, but now opening to the rear section of the house. The hall is bisected by a timber arch with moulded pilasters, imposts, extrados and keystone. On the southeast is a large living room, divided by a large opening which originally housed folding cedar doors which have since been removed, with a fireplace at the southern end with marble surround and tiled inserts. Two bedrooms and a dressing room (originally Welsby's library) are located on the northwest. The building has vertically boarded walls, boarded ceilings with ceiling roses, panelled timber doors with fanlights, and timber skirtings, architraves and cornices.

Internally, the rear section of the building has similar finishes, with a large central room with an internal stair to the laundry and garage below, a panel of hopper windows to the southwest with leadlight panels above, and a large ceiling rose. Two bedrooms are located to the southeast, and a bathroom links into the original verandah which is expressed in the ceiling line. A study and a kitchen with a brick fireplace, consisting of the original kitchen wing, are located on the northwest.

The grounds are terraced to the northeast leading to the river, with a central path and stair leading from the main entry to the early timber picket fence and gate at the river's edge. A wrought iron arch with a pendant lamp and timber posts forms the entry from Welsby Street, and a path leads to the main entry. Compass points are set into the path at the main entry, and coral is used for some garden bed edgings. Two large palms are located in the northeast grounds, one at either side of the property, with the northern palm surrounded by a large strangler fig. Large palms and timber steps are located to the east of the building, and camphor laurel trees border the rear yard. A small corrugated iron garage with a skillion roof is located to the south of the building, and a flagpole is located near the picket fence at the river's edge.

== Heritage listing ==
Amity was listed on the Queensland Heritage Register on 21 October 1992 having satisfied the following criteria.

The place is important in demonstrating the evolution or pattern of Queensland's history.

Amity is the last surviving timber riverfront residence at New Farm, and provides evidence that the building's immediate vicinity, now principally industrial in nature, was once a fashionable residential area.

The place demonstrates rare, uncommon or endangered aspects of Queensland's cultural heritage.

Amity is the last surviving timber riverfront residence at New Farm, and provides evidence that the building's immediate vicinity, now principally industrial in nature, was once a fashionable residential area.

The place is important in demonstrating the principal characteristics of a particular class of cultural places.

The building, though not opulent in finishes and detailing, displays a high quality of design and is very intact.

The place is important because of its aesthetic significance.

The building, though not opulent in finishes and detailing, displays a high quality of design and is very intact. The substantial plantings, including palms, figs and camphor laurels, ensure the property contributes strongly to the area's riverscape quality.

The place has a special association with the life or work of a particular person, group or organisation of importance in Queensland's history.

Constructed by Thomas Welsby, prominent Brisbane businessman, politician, historian and sportsman, in 1892, Amity was his principal residence until his death in 1941. The property retains substantial evidence of Welsby's occupation, interests and love of Moreton Bay, including the building's general intactness, design and orientation to the river, artefacts and leadlight panels. The extent of the grounds (dating from 1897), and the gardens including plantings, terracing, borders, artefacts and fencing, are important evidence of Welsby's interests and his long association with Amity. The building remained in the family's possession until 1952, since which time it has had a long association with the nearby CSR Ltd refinery as a manager's residence. Purchased by the Commonwealth in 1980, it has been the principal naval residence in Queensland, associated with HMAS Moreton until its closure in 1994.
