= Bulimba ferry wharf =

Bulimba
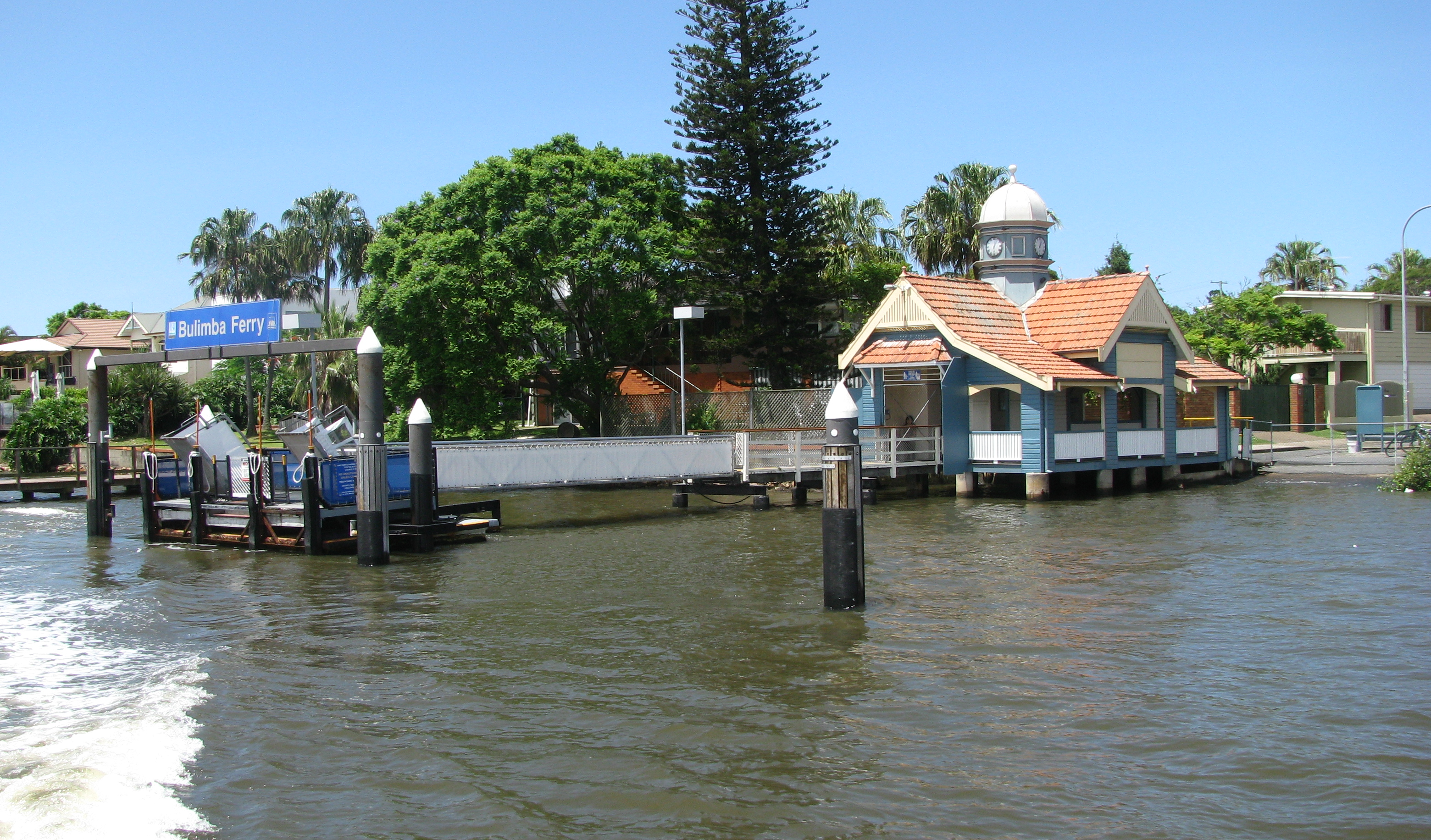

General information
- Location: Oxford Street, Bulimba
- Coordinates: 27°27′01″S 153°03′08″E
- Owner: Brisbane City Council
- Operator: RiverCity Ferries
- Platforms: 1

Construction
- Accessible: Yes

Other information
- Station code: 317584
- Fare zone: go card 1

History
- Opened: 1922
- Rebuilt: 2014

Services
Preceding wharf	RiverCity Ferries	Following wharf
Hawthorne towards UQ St Lucia	CityCat	Teneriffe towards Northshore Hamilton
Terminus	Cross River Ferries–Bulimba	Teneriffe Terminus
Location

Bulimba ferry terminal
- Location within Queensland
- 27.4504°S 153.0525°E
- Location: Oxford Street, Bulimba, City of Brisbane, Queensland, Australia

History
- Design period: 1919–1930s (interwar period)
- Built: 1922

Site notes
- Architect: GHM Addison & Son
- Architectural style: Arts & Crafts

Queensland Heritage Register
- Official name: Bulimba Ferry Terminal, Bulimba Ferry House, Bulimba Waiting shed and landing
- Type: state heritage (landscape, built)
- Designated: 12 January 2003
- Reference no.: 602211
- Significant period: 1920s (historical); 1922–ongoing (social)
- Significant components: pontoon, views to, bench/seat, jetty/pier, views from, shed – shelter, waiting shed, tower – clock, ramp

Bulimba ferry wharf is a heritage-listed ferry wharf at Oxford Street, Bulimba, City of Brisbane, Queensland, Australia. It is located on the southern side of the Brisbane River serving the Brisbane suburb of Bulimba. It is served by RiverCity Ferries' CityCat service and the Cross River service to Teneriffe. It was designed by GHM Addison and Son and built in 1922 by E Taylor. Also referred to as the Bulimba ferry house and Bulimba waiting shed & landing, the wharf was listed on the Queensland Heritage Register on 12 January 2003.

== Design ==
The terminal's waiting shed is an open timber-framed structure clad in weatherboard and has a gabled roof with terracotta tiles. At the intersection of the roof gables is a short octagonal tower with four clock faces, topped by a metal cupola.

== History ==
The Bulimba ferry wharf was built in 1922 for the Balmoral Shire Council, then responsible for the efficient servicing of several ferry routes across the Brisbane River.

Since the days of the convict settlement at Moreton Bay when a punt was poled between the main settlement and the south bank of the river, ferries have been a vital transport facility for Brisbane. The river twists and loops through the city and cross-river access is important in linking city and suburbs and greatly reducing travel time between them. Although the first Victoria Bridge linked the Brisbane CBD and South Brisbane in 1862, no other bridges were built for many years, public transport was limited and few people had private transport until after World War II. People who needed to commute to work and to access shopping and entertainment facilities used cross-river ferries on a daily basis. Ferries were the only major transport service provided by metropolitan local authorities as responsibility for care and management had been placed in their hands by an 1858 Act.

In November 1844 the first ferry service commenced between Customs House and Kangaroo Point and in 1850 Samuel and Matthew Buckley operated a rowing boat ferry service at Bulimba. In 1864, John Watson began a vehicular ferry at Bulimba under lease. He purchased the allotment at the wharf to build his house. The route was then serviced by the steam paddleboat "Advance" until transferred to the city route when the 1893 floods destroyed the Victoria Bridge. It was replaced at Bulimba by a punt operated by winch and cable until a new ferry was obtained.

In 1888 Bulimba and Hawthorne were included in the area for which the Balmoral Divisional Board was responsible. Balmoral Shire was created in 1901 and was responsible for Apollo Road, Bulimba, Norman Park and Hawthorne ferries. A special sub-committee was responsible for the provision of boats, buildings and landings and fixed fares. In 1921 the Balmoral council decided to replace the existing waiting sheds and landing at Bulimba with a substantial ferry house to shelter waiting passengers. In 1922 they commissioned a ferry house design from the prominent architectural firm of GHM Addison & Son. The tender of E Taylor was accepted for the construction in July 1922. By August the building was under construction and tenders for the construction of a pontoon were called in September 1922.

The design for the proposed building appeared in the December 1922 edition of the Architects and Builders Journal of Queensland; however, as George Henry Male Addison died in February 1922 following a protracted illness, the design is most likely by his son George Frederick Addison. The quality of the building and the choice of a noted firm of architects for the design attest to the importance of the ferry service in the life of the community.

George Henry Male Addison was Welsh-born and trained in England. He immigrated to Adelaide in 1883 and then moved Melbourne. He was an artist as well as an architect and was one of the founders of Melbourne Art Society. He moved to Brisbane in 1886 as local partner of Terry, Oakden and Addison. Addison won prizes for both architectural design and fine arts and served on a number of important committees and advisory panels connected with both. In late 1892 he set up in practice on his own, forming a partnership with Leslie G Corrie in 1898. The firm designed many major buildings including churches, banks and commercial buildings. From 1919 he was in practice with his son, George Frederick Addison as G Addison & Son. G F Addison studied at Brisbane Central Technical College and was articled to his father. Apart from his military service in World War I, he practiced as an architect until 1940.

In 1924 the Balmoral Council called tenders for a second ferry house, to a slightly modified version of the Bulimba design, to be erected at the Hawthorne ferry wharf. Both terminals can be seen at one time from the river. The steam ferry "Hetherington" served the Bulimba route for many years, being estimated to have been responsible for over 10 million passenger and 2 million vehicle trips between 1928 and its decommissioning in 1952. There was also a motor ferry on the route.

The ferry connected Bulimba with Teneriffe, which was the site of many industrial and commercial enterprises, so that the ferry carried many people to and from work. It was also put to an unexpected community use as illustrated by the comment of the Sunday Mail of 3 March 1929 that the ferry house was being used informally as a dressing shed for local youths who were swimming in the river.

In 1925 the various Brisbane district councils amalgamated into a single local government authority, the Brisbane City Council, and construction of ferry wharves because their responsibility. In October 1925 the contract for the new waiting shed at Hawthorne was let for the original design, though other Brisbane City Council terminal buildings were less ornamental. Of the other ferry wharf buildings on the Brisbane River, most were built much later and none are as ornate as the Brisbane and Hawthorne ferry houses.

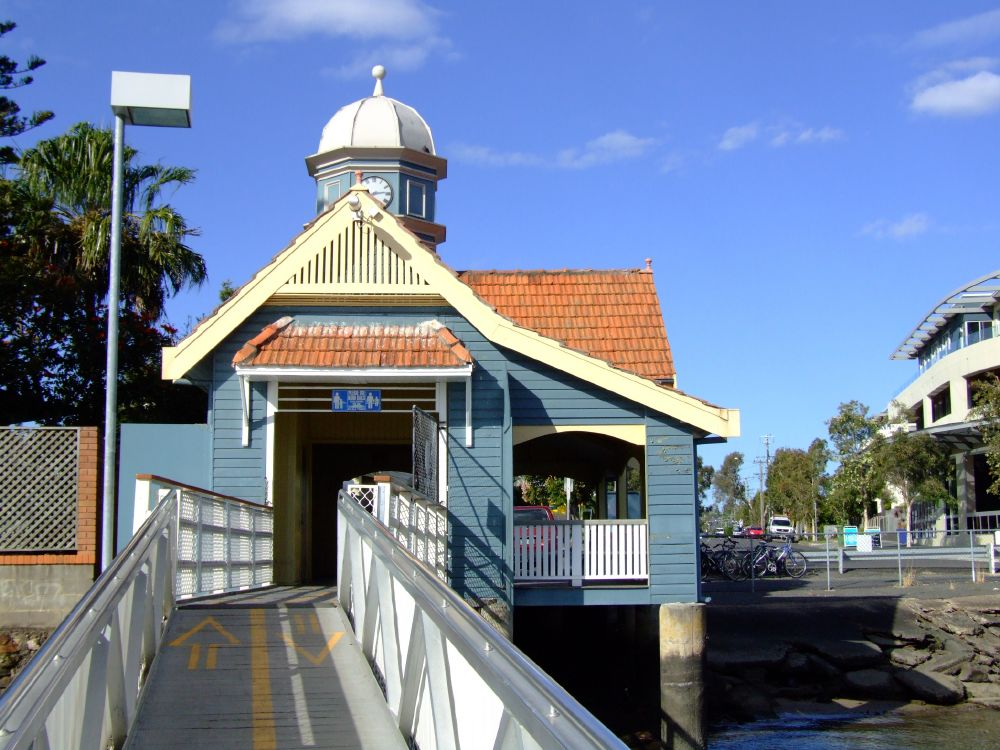
View from the pontoon, 2008

In 1985 extensive repairs and renovations were carried out to the Bulimba ferry house, which included replacing the clocks in the tower.

The wharf sustained minor damage during the January 2011 Brisbane floods. It reopened after repairs on 14 February 2011.

The terminal was closed from 5 August until 14 December 2014 in order facilitate an upgrade. The upgrade improved the efficiency of services by installing a multi-berth pontoon as well as overnight moorings for vessels.

== Description ==
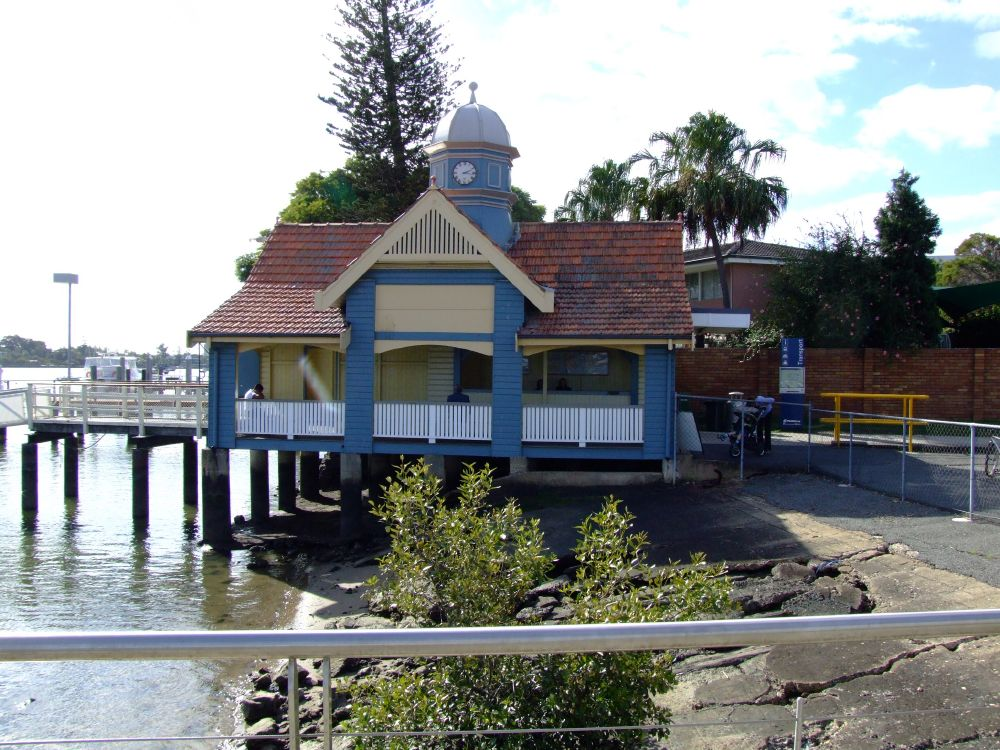
Side view, 2008

The Bulimba ferry wharf is a small picturesque structure on the bank of the Brisbane River at the end of Oxford Street, Bulimba. It is approached from the riverside by a pontoon and from the landward side by a pathway and entrance leading into a covered waiting area.

The terminal is an open timber-framed structure set on stumps and clad with weatherboards. It is rectangular in plan with a verandah running along the southern side. The roof is gabled and has an intersecting gable to the south, which forms a raised central feature dividing the verandah roof into three bays. These have shallow arched openings and timber balustrades. The roof is clad in terracotta tiles and the gable ends have decorative timberwork and paired brackets. At the crossing of the roof gables is a low octagonal tower with four clock faces topped by a metal cupola.

The interior has a timber floor and ceiling and there are timber bench seats against the walls and a storage locker.

== Heritage listing ==
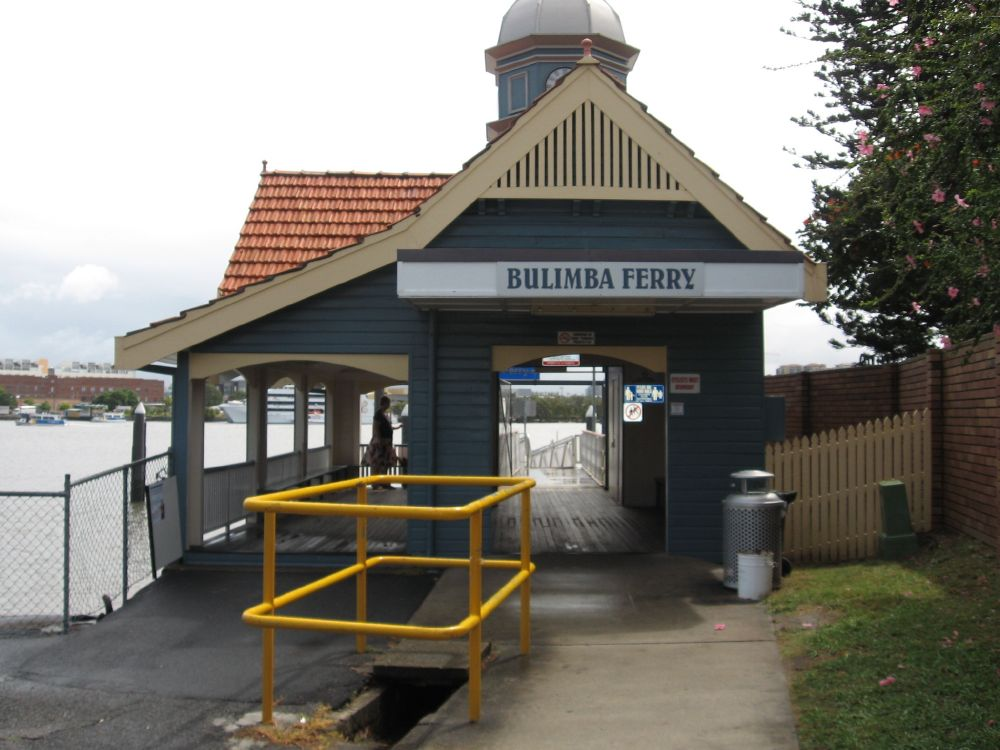
Approach from the land side, 2009

Bulimba ferry wharf was listed on the Queensland Heritage Register on 12 January 2003 having satisfied the following criteria.

The place is important in demonstrating the evolution or pattern of Queensland's history.

The Bulimba ferry wharf is important as one of a pair of intact purpose-built ferry wharves from the first part of the 20th century. As with the Hawthorne ferry wharf, its quality of design and detail demonstrates the importance of ferries in the development of Brisbane before a network of bridges and public transport was fully developed and before many people owned cars. The ferry wharves are also evidence for the workings of the Balmoral Shire Council before the Brisbane suburban councils were amalgamated in 1925.

The place demonstrates rare, uncommon or endangered aspects of Queensland's cultural heritage.

The Hawthorne and Bulimba ferry wharves were the largest ever built to service Brisbane ferries and are now rare as early examples of their type, as most Brisbane River ferry wharves are now served by modern buildings.

The place is important in demonstrating the principal characteristics of a particular class of cultural places.

The Bulimba ferry wharf not only illustrates the architectural details of the Federation Queen Anne style as applied to a small scale building, but also those features typical of ferry wharves comprising a pontoon for river access, a landing area and covered waiting area for passengers. The clock faces placed in the tower helped people to be on time for ferries that ran to an accurate timetable.

The Bulimba ferry wharf is significant as a creative example of the later work of the prominent Queensland architectural firm of GMH Addison & Son who are generally known for larger buildings.

The place is important because of its aesthetic significance.

The Bulimba ferry house has considerable aesthetic significance as a small public building that exhibits a high standard of design. Domestic scale and details have been imaginatively applied to a wharf building of mundane function. The building is a landmark both from the water and from the landward side.

The place has a strong or special association with a particular community or cultural group for social, cultural or spiritual reasons.

The Bulimba ferry wharf has a long association with the residents of the area as a building often used on a daily basis and as a local landmark that makes an important contribution to the character of the area.
