= Bulimba =

- Suburb
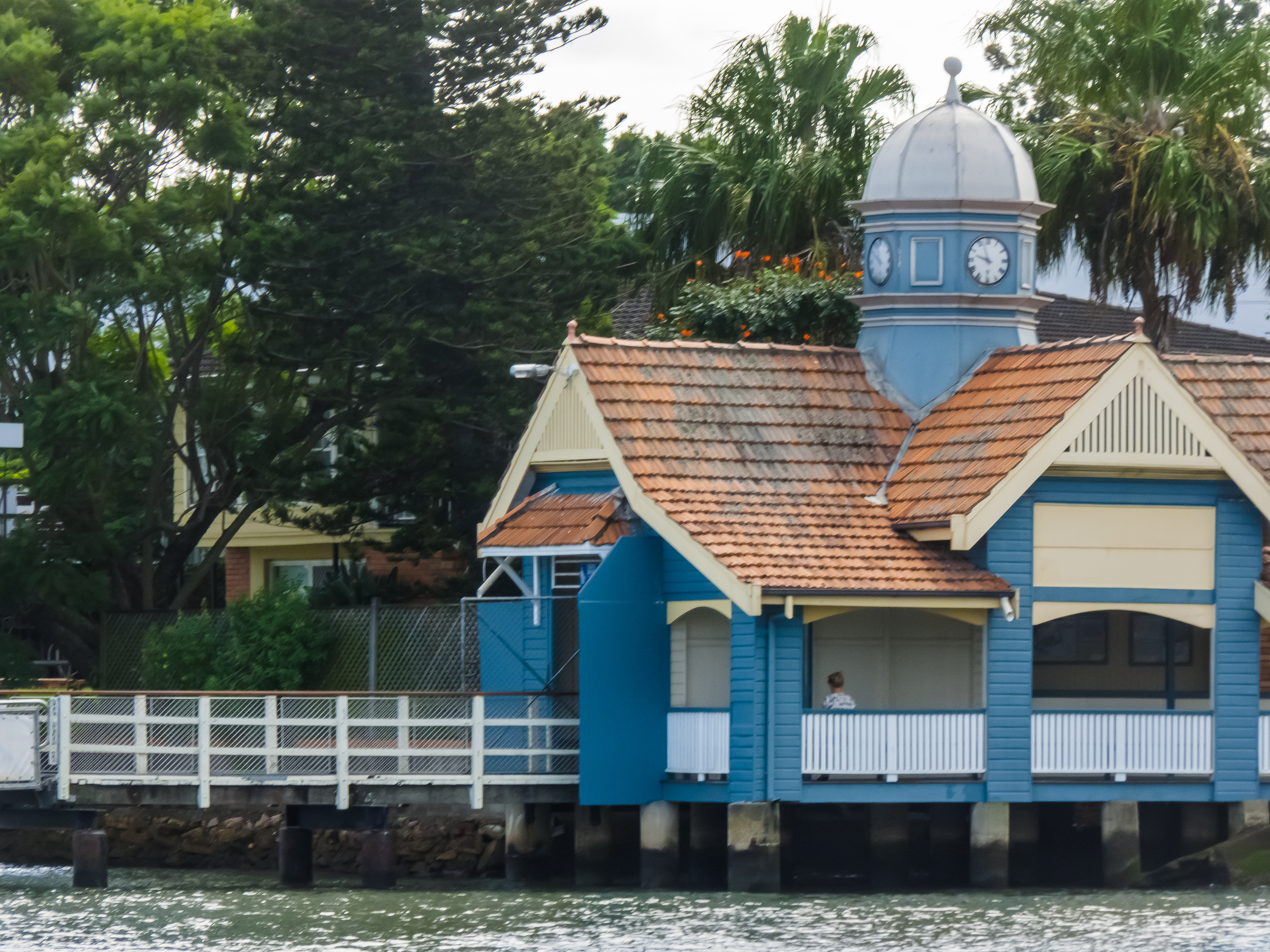
- Bulimba Ferry Terminal, Bulimba

- Interactive map of Bulimba
- Coordinates: 27.45°S 153.0583°E
- Country: Australia
- State: Queensland
- City: Brisbane
- LGA: City of Brisbane (Morningside Ward)
- Location: 9.0 km (5.6 mi) NE of Brisbane CBD

Government
  - State electorate: Bulimba
  - Federal division: Griffith

Area
  - Total: 2.9 km^{2} (1.1 sq mi)

Population
  - Total: 7,623 (2021 census)
  - Density: 2,630/km^{2} (6,810/sq mi)
- Time zone: UTC+10:00 (AEST)
- Postcode: 4171
Suburbs around Bulimba
Hamilton	Hamilton	Hamilton
Newstead	Bulimba	Morningside
Teneriffe	Hawthorne	Balmoral

Bulimba is an affluent inner eastern suburb in the City of Brisbane, Queensland, Australia, located approximately 4 kilometres (2.5 mi) north-east of the Brisbane CBD on the southern bank of the Brisbane River.

Characterised by its riverside setting, leafy residential streets, traditional Queenslander architecture homes, and a prominent dining and retail precinct centred on Oxford Street, Bulimba forms part of the upscale 4171 postcode.

== Geography ==
Bulimba is located 4 kilometres (2.5 mi) north-east of the CBD on the southern bank of the Brisbane River, but it is 9 kilometres (5.6 mi) by road.

== Toponymy ==
Bulimba is reportedly a Yugarapul word used meaning 'place of the magpie lark'. The same word is the origin of the nearby Bulimba Creek, and of the Bulimba Reach on which the suburb is located. The leader, Bilin Bilin, has his name based upon the magpie lark, or the pee-wee.

== History ==
Bulimba was originally inhabited by the Yuggara people, who have lived in the area for at least 20,000 years.

In the 1820s, Bulimba was called Toogoolawah and was settled as a farming district, with residential subdivision commencing in the 1880s land boom.

In 1862, a Baptist church opened in Bulimba. In April 1886, a new Baptist Church was erected on the same site.

In April 1864, local residents began to lobby for a school. Bulimba Mixed School opened on Monday 16 July 1866 with an initial enrolment of 45 students. The school initially operated out of the Wesleyan Chapel until the school buildings and teacher's residence were completed in 1867. It was subsequently renamed Bulimba State School.

David McConnell of Bulimba House held the first religious services in his home. A Primitive Methodist congregation was formed and met "in the shade of a large tree which stood midway between the Bulimba Ferry and the site of the present church". The Primitive Methodist Church was built in 1866, opening on Good Friday, 30 March 1866. It was the first church in the district. Growing suburban development in the area required a larger church, so a two-storey addition was added to the front of the church in 1926 as part of the church's 60th year celebrations, with the upper storey extending the existing church, while the lower storey was used as a hall and kindergarten. With the amalgamation of the Methodist Church into the Uniting Church in Australia in 1977, it became the present Bulimba Uniting Church.

In September 1884, 39 subdivided allotments of "Amos Estate" were advertised to be auctioned by Hooker, Son and Elliot. A map advertising the auction shows that the estate was located directly opposite the river from the Hamilton Hotel and adjacent to Apollo Candle Works.

In November 1884, 73 re-subdivided allotments of "Riding Estate" were advertised for auction by Hooker, Son & Elliot. A map advertising the auction shows the proximity of the estate to the Brisbane River, the State School, a local Church and Apollo Candle Works.

In 1885, the first bicycle (Safety Cycle) was built in Queensland by Reginald Blunt of Bulimba and proudly raced on by Brisbane cyclist Peter Dowd.

In January 1885, 81 allotments of "Bulimba Bridge Estate" were advertised to be auctioned by R.D. Graham & Son. A map advertising the auction shows the site of a proposed suspension bridge across the Brisbane River.

In March 1887, the Bulimba School of Arts opened. It was funded jointly by state government endowment and private subscription from 70 subscribers. The School of Arts included the first Bulimba Library.

In July 1888, 190 allotments in the "Bulimba Hill Estate" were advertised for auction by G. T. Bell. A map advertising the auction shows the proximity of the estate to several landmarks including Bulimba, New Farm, Kangaroo Point and Queen Street, Brisbane CBD.

Lady Musgrave, wife of the Queensland Governor Anthony Musgrave, laid the first block of St John the Baptist's Anglican Church on 23 June 1888. T Whitty constructed it at a cost of £700 and the first service was held there on 29 September 1888 on St Michael and All Angels Day, at which Archdeacon of Brisbane, Nathaniel Dawes, blessed the building. As Bishop of Brisbane William Webber was then overseas, the dedication and consecration took place on 2 June 1889.

In October 1888, 102 subdivided allotments of "Woodlands Estate" were advertised to be auctioned by Arthur Martin & Co. A map advertising the auction shows the location of the estate in relation to Brisbane Street and the Brisbane River. In April 1889, allotments in the "Bulimba Hill Estate" were advertised to be auctioned by G. T. Bell. A map advertising the auction shows the location of the estate in proximity to the Brisbane River and the Cleveland Railway Line. The Apollo Candle Works opened in the 1880s. It is now the site of the Bulimba Barracks.

In April 1890, "Allendale Estate" made up of 85 allotments was advertised for auction by John S. White. A map advertising the auction shows the estate is bordered by Riding Road and what is now Hawthorne Road and was advertised as convenient to the steam ferry.

In December 1890, 138 allotments of "Bulimba Hill Estate" were advertised for auction by G.T. Bell. A map advertising the auction states that the land was the property of Metropolitan Freehold Land and Building Company (Limited).

In 1904, the Balmoral Shire Council purchased land and create Jamieson Park, named after the early Bulimba resident Robert Jamieson who originally donated approximately four hectares of land. In honour of the World War I servicemen who died in the conflict, the name of the park was changed to the Bulimba Memorial Park on 4 November 1919, trees were planted, and an honour board was mounted. Each tree was dedicated to a Bulimba serviceman, and labeled with plaques. The plaques and many of the trees are no longer there, however the Brisbane City Council and Bulimba District Historical Society are currently working on a project to replace the honour board, and plaques for those servicemen who bravely fought.

In September 1906, the opening of the Dalgety's new wool and grain store in Newstead meant many locals were employed.

Until around 1910, the area on the opposite (north) side of the Brisbane River was also called Bulimba, that area since being called Teneriffe or New Farm.

In December 1911, several building sites of "Bulimba Hill Estate" were advertised to be auctioned by Albert E. Harte. A map advertising the auction states that the estate had lovely river views and was a place "Where the ocean breezes ever blow".

At the end of World War I, Bulimba took part in the social housing project by constructing five ANZAC cottages. The ANZAC Cottage Trust was established to assist widows and servicemen who were under financial hardship. The timber cottages were built on donated land and constructed by volunteer labour.

On 12 December 1915, Archbishop James Duhig laid the foundation stone for a Catholic school in Bulimba. Saints Peter and Paul's Catholic School was operated by the Sisters of the Good Samaritan and opened to an estimated 200 students on 3 February 1916. On Sunday 6 February 1916 Duhig returned to bless and officially open the school. The school is now located within the boundaries of neighbouring suburb Balmoral.

Bulimba resident Frederick Dickson (son of Queensland Premier Sir James Dickson) was best known for his position as acting judge in the Queensland Industrial Court in 1916. He ordered the reinstatement and reimbursement of wages for a Queensland worker, which resulted in becoming Queensland's first dismissal case. He was also known for his involvement with the Bulimba Sailing Club.

In February 1918, 256 grand riverview sites of "New Dock Estate" were advertised to be auctioned by Isles, Love and Co. A map advertising the auction states that the sites would be splendid for motor boatists, dock engineers, boiler makers, foundry hands and boat builders.

In May 1921, 62 subdivided allotments of "Baldwin Estate" were advertised to be auctioned by Cameron Bros. A map advertising the auction states the Estate was close to the Hamilton Motor Ferry and the Bulimba State School.

In November 1923, the "School of Arts Estate" at the Bulimba 5 ways, made up of 72 allotments, was advertised to be auctioned by B. Hanniffe A.F.I.A. A map advertising the auction states that the estate was within 2 miles of the G.P.O. and served by 3 ferries, the Morningside Railway and motor bus. The land was advertised as green lawn allotments with water and electric light adjacent, and suitable for business or home sites.

Norman R Wright & Sons have operated a shipyard in Bulimba since the 1930s, where many of the Transdev Brisbane Ferries were built.

The Bulimba District Girl Guides was formed in 1931.

In 1938, the student numbers at Bulimba State School exceeded the capacity of the existing building and a new large brick building was erected. It was designed by architect Gilbert Robert Beveridge to accommodate 512 students.

The Bulimba public library opened in 1964.

The suburb is home to two Defence Force Cadets Units, one Army and one Navy – 12th Army Cadet Unit and TS Gayndah at the former Bulimba Barracks, now HMAS Moreton on Apollo Road. The Australian Government Department of Defence announced the sale of the Bulimba Barracks in March 2015, while retaining part of the site as HMAS Moreton and since this time, the Brisbane City Council has engaged in consultation with the community and has amended the City Plan to support future green space initiatives along the river, housing development, and infrastructure upgrades. The Bulimba Barracks Master Plan was published in November 2015.

== Demographics ==
In the 2016 census, Bulimba had a population of 6,843 people. The population was 51% female and 49% male. The median age of the population was 37, 1 year younger than the Australian average. 68.2% of people in the census were born in Australia. The next most common countries of birth were England 6.4% and New Zealand 3.8%. 82.6% of people spoke only English at home. The most common responses for religion were No Religion 33.8%, Catholic 23.6% and Anglican 16.3%.

In the 2021 census, Bulimba had a population of 7,623 people.

== Heritage listings ==
Bulimba has a number of heritage-listed sites, including:

- 167 Apollo Road: Bulimba Army Barracks (also known as Apollo Barge Assembly Depot)
- 49 Bulimba Street: Greenock (house in the California Bungalow style)
- 90 Bulimba Street: Caothers family residence (Queenslander)
- 3 Coutts Street: Sailly Lorette (Interwar house)
- 152 Coutts Street: Naval cannon
- 23 Harrison Street: Mount Lang (Interwar bungalow)
- 29 Jamieson Street: Anzac Cottage
- 34 Kenbury Street: Bulimba House
- 40 Oxford Street: Crouch Cottage
- 129 Oxford Street: Bulimba Memorial Park (also known as Jamieson Park, Bulimba Soldiers and Sailors Memorial Park)
- 179 Oxford Street: St John the Baptist Anglican Church
- 216 Oxford Street: Bulimba Uniting Church (also known as Bulimba Methodist Church)
- 219 Oxford Street: Balmoral War Memorial
- 261 Oxford Street: Bulimba State School
- Road Reserve Apollo Road (27.4435°S 153.0637°E): Apollo Road Ferry Terminal & Toilet Block
- Road Reserve Oxford Street (27.4503°S 153.0525°E): Bulimba ferry wharf
- 30 Stuart Street: Anzac Cottage
- 32 Stuart Street: Anzac Cottage

== Economy ==
In 2016, Bulimba had 4673 registered vehicles and 829 registered businesses.

== Education ==
Bulimba State School is a government primary (Prep–6) school for boys and girls at Oxford Street (27.4531°S 153.0650°E). In 2018, the school had an enrolment of 848 students with 59 teachers (51 full-time equivalent) and 35 non-teaching staff (21 full-time equivalent). It includes a special education program.

Sts Peter and Paul's School is a Catholic primary (Prep–6) school for boys and girls at 33 Alexandra Street (27.4590°S 153.0640°E). In 2018, the school had an enrolment of 653 students with 41 teachers (36 full-time equivalent) and 30 non-teaching staff (20 full-time equivalent).

There is no secondary school in Bulimba. The nearest government secondary school is Balmoral State High School in neighbouring Balmoral to the south-east.

== Amenities ==
The Brisbane City Council operates a public library on the corner of Oxford Street and Riding Road.

St John the Baptist Anglican Church is at 171 Oxford Street (27.4517°S 153.0602°E) and holds regular services each week.

Bulimba Uniting Church is at 216 Oxford Street (27.4516°S 153.0623°E).

The 12th Army Cadet Unit parades at HMAS Moreton on Monday nights, since 2006 after relocating from Camp Hill. The unit provides youth development in an Army setting.

The Bulimba District Girl Guides meet at the Bulimba Girl Guides Hut located at 7 Barramul Street (27.4535°S 153.05742°E).

The Bulimba District Historical Society and Friends of Balmoral Cemetery are two active community groups sharing local historical information, and holding regular meetings for interested members of the community.

=== Parks ===
There are a number of parks in the suburb, including:

- Addison Avenue Park (27.4514°S 153.0532°E)
- Bulimba Memorial Park (27.4523°S 153.0572°E)
- Bulimba Riverside Park (27.4540°S 153.0540°E)
- Johnston Park (27.4453°S 153.0581°E)
- Love Street Park (27.4543°S 153.0558°E)
- Merry Street Park (27.4448°S 153.0558°E)
- Myuna Street Park (27.4507°S 153.0681°E)
- Portside Place Park (27.4424°S 153.0537°E)
- Stuart Street Park (27.4545°S 153.0571°E)
- Tugulawa Park (27.4488°S 153.0638°E)
- Vic Lucas Park (27.4445°S 153.0521°E)
- Waterline Crescent Park (27.4560°S 153.0556°E)

== Sports ==
Bulimba Golf Club has a 9-hole golf course in Quay Street (27.4445°S 153.0514°E).

Brisbane Sailing Squadron is at 128 Quay Street beside the Brisbane River (27.4446°S 153.0510°E).

The Bulimba Sports Club is the home of the Riverside Rebels rugby union club.

Despite its name, the Morningside Scout Group holds meetings and activities at Balmoral Park.

Despite its name, Bulimba Memorial Bowls and Community Club is in neighbouring Balmoral. It offers competitive and social lawn bowls.

Other sporting facilities in the area include the Bulimba Women's Hockey Club, Bulimba Cricket Club, Brisbane 18 Footers Sailing Club, and Southside Eagles Football Club.

== Transport ==
CityCat ferry services stop at Bulimba's two ferry wharves located on Oxford Street and Apollo Road while a Cross River service to Teneriffe ferry wharf stops at Oxford Street. Bulimba is also serviced by Transport for Brisbane buses, on route numbers 230, P231 and 232.
