= Teneriffe ferry wharf =

Ferry wharf in Brisbane

Teneriffe
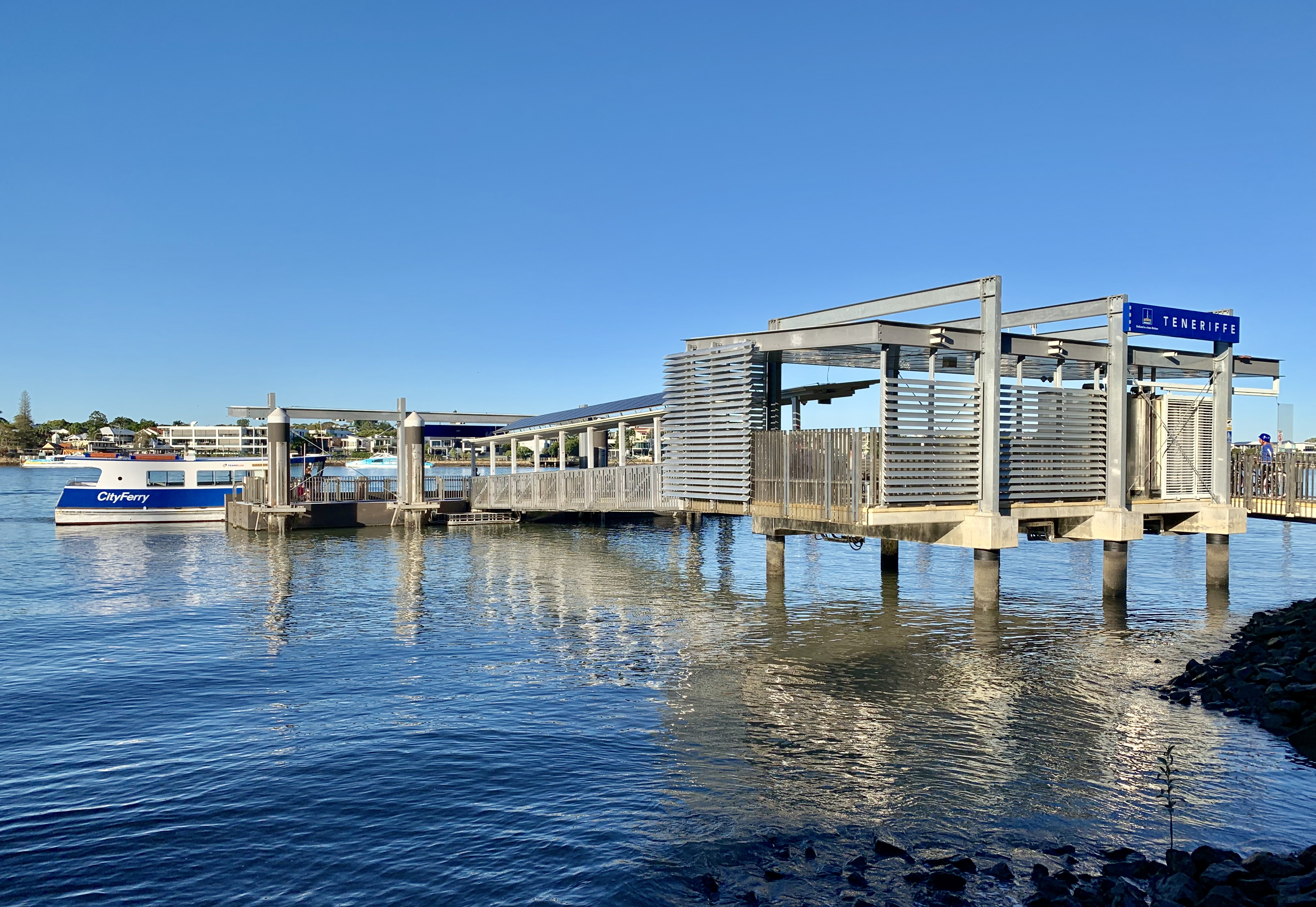

General information
- Location: Commercial Road, Teneriffe
- Coordinates: 27°27′06″S 153°02′57″E
- Owner: Brisbane City Council
- Operator: RiverCity Ferries
- Platforms: 2

Construction
- Accessible: Yes

Other information
- Station code: 317587
- Fare zone: go card 1

History
- Rebuilt: 11 January 2012

Services
Preceding wharf	RiverCity Ferries	Following wharf
Bulimba towards UQ St Lucia	CityCat	Bretts Wharf towards Northshore Hamilton
Bulimba Terminus	Cross River Ferries–Bulimba	Terminus
Location

Teneriffe ferry wharf is located on the northern side of the Brisbane River serving the Brisbane suburb of Teneriffe in Queensland, Australia. It is served by RiverCity Ferries' CityCat service and a Cross River service to Bulimba.

== History ==
The original wharf sustained minor damage during the January 2011 Brisbane floods. It reopened after repairs on 14 February 2011. It closed on 12 June 2015 and was demolished early 2022.

In July 2011, construction began on a new wharf adjacent to the existing one with pontoons for two CityCats and waiting area with seating for 50 people. The old wharf was removed. The new terminal opened on 11 January 2012, with services commencing on 23 January 2012.
