= Urban renewal in Woolstore Precinct, Teneriffe =

Residential area in Brisbane, Australia

The Woolstore Precinct is a residential area in the suburb of Teneriffe in Brisbane, Queensland, Australia. A former industrial and commercial area, it has undergone urban renewal with preservation and re-purposing of many buildings from the early 20th century. This renewal has been guided by neighbourhood plans formulated by Brisbane City Council, with advice from the Queensland Heritage Council.

== Location and characteristics ==
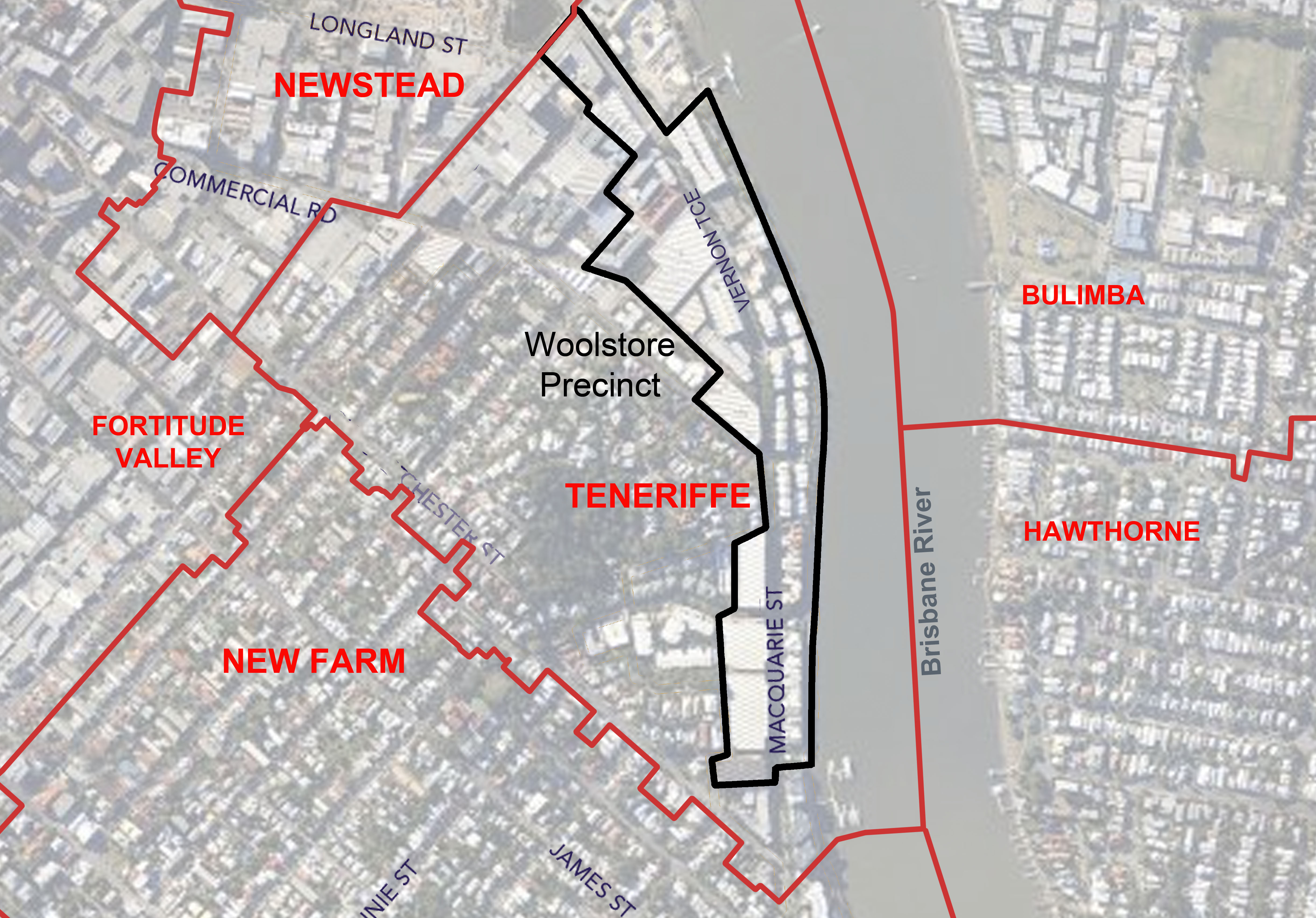
Woolstore Precinct, Teneriffe, Queensland

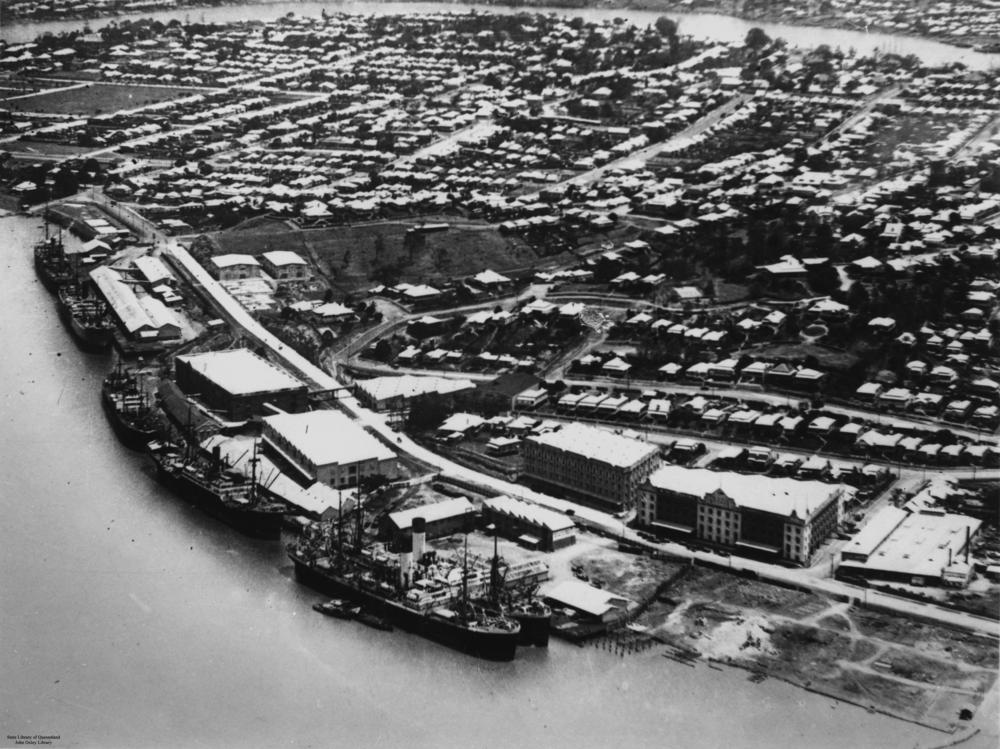
The Woolstore Precinct, Teneriffe as Queensland's heart of wool industry, ca. 1925

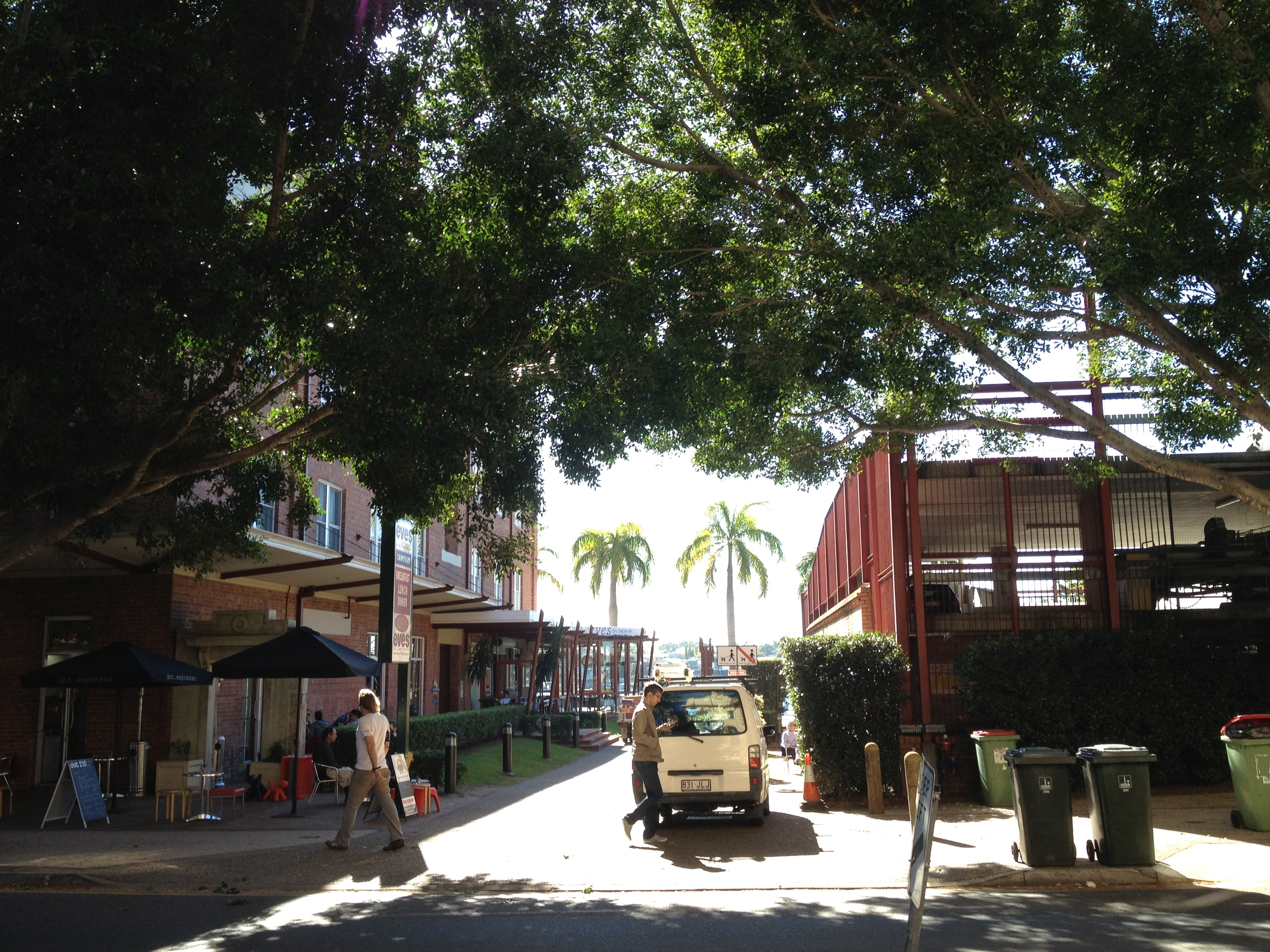
Woolstore Precinct today with renovated heritage buildings and commercial activities on the ground level, encourages a desirable riverfront lifestyle

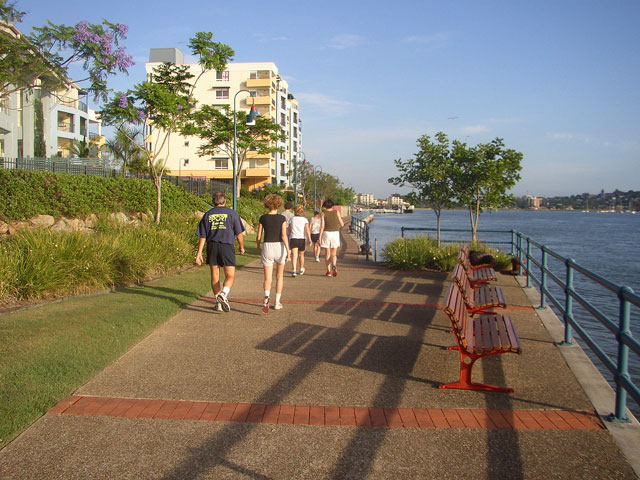
Teneriffe Boardwalk, as part of the Catalina & Teneriffe Complex Developments, opens up the riverfront to public and increase connectivity to the CBD and other riverside suburbs

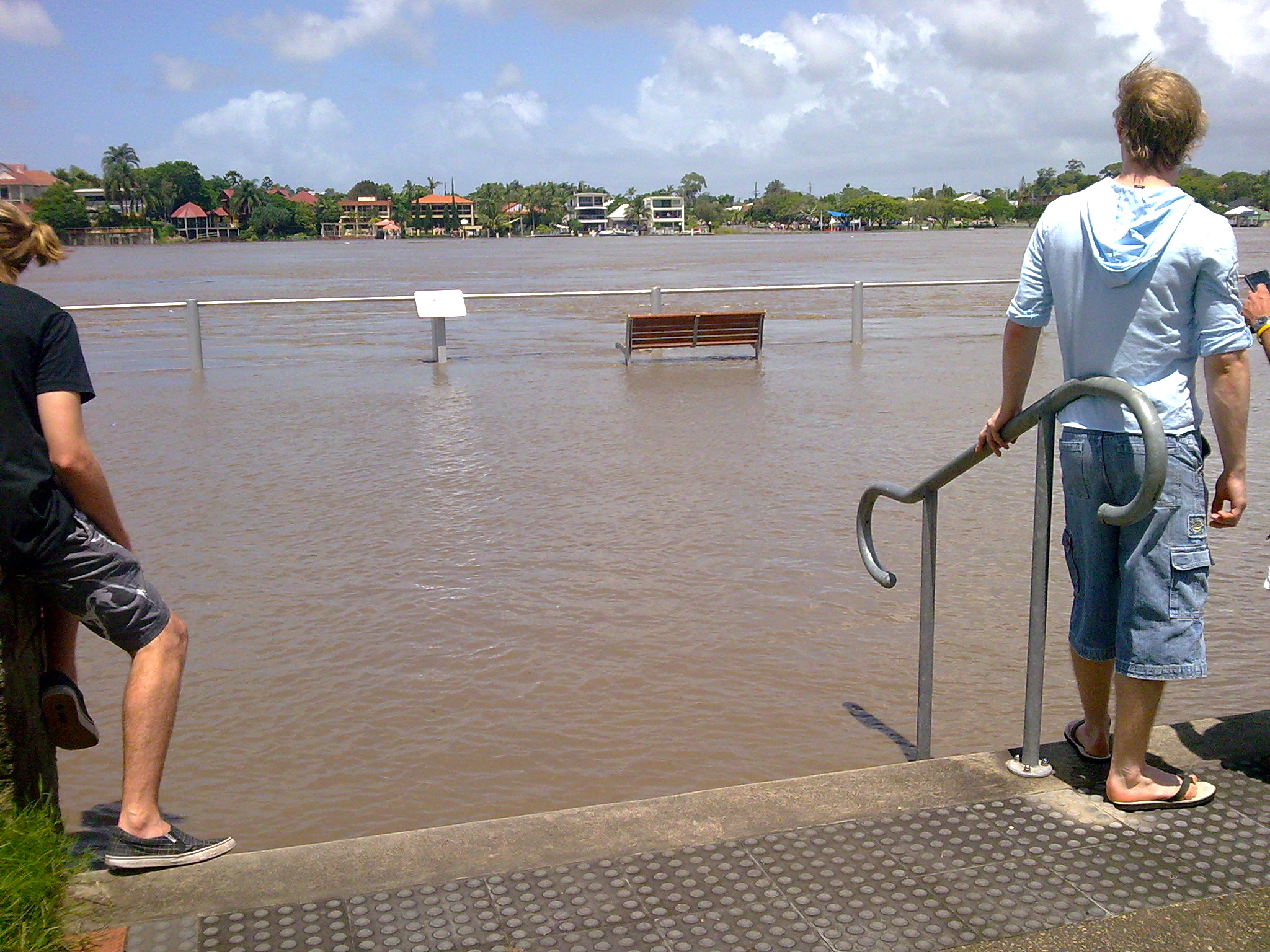
Flooding of part of Teneriffe Boardwalk across from Ansonia Apartments, next to the historical Engine Room of former Capricorn Wharf on 12 January 2011 during the Queensland Flood.

Located within the suburb of Teneriffe, Queensland, the Woolstore Precinct is the riverfront area bounded by Wyandra Street (from riverfront to no. 55 Wyandra St) and Commercial Road (including the Skyring Terrace side of Helen Street and Commercial Road) at the north, Florence Street at the west, running down along southern part of Chermside Street, including Macquarie Street and up to Hasting Street at the south. (See Precinct Map)

The Woolstore Precinct is characterised by its many historical wool stores and other industrial structures erected in the beginning of the 20th century. Once dominated by wharves, wool stores and factories, the area has been gradually transformed into a medium-high density residential community starting from the early 1990s. By preserving its distinctive industrial heritage, together with the addition of upmarket apartments, parks, boardwalks, retailing and business premises that promotes riverfront lifestyle, the Woolstore Precinct is today one of the most sought-after addresses in the inner city suburbs of Brisbane.

== Driving force ==
The transformation of the inner city suburbs has been largely driven by the rapidly increasing concentration of business services, education and health services in the Central Business District (CBD) and the nearby business districts such as Southbank, Milton, Herston, Toowong, Indooroopilly and St Lucia. Professionals, managers and overseas students are attracted by the inner-city living lifestyle Housing market in suburbs surrounding the CBD thus experienced increasing pressure. It is projected that 138,000 new in-fill dwellings are needed by year 2031 in order to satisfy the rapid growth.

Through the urban renewal projects, Newstead & Teneriffe region, including the historical Woolstore Precinct, has been able to contribute to the housing market by increasing its dwelling number from 440 (1991) to 3500 (2006). This number is expected to grow to 8700 dwellings in 2031.

== Agencies ==
Governments at all levels have been active in encouraging urban consolidation. This is seen in various forms, including Brisbane City Council encouraging in-fill housing development, and the master-planned redevelopment of the inner north-eastern suburbs led by the Urban Renewal Task Force.

=== Urban Renewal Brisbane (URB) ===
In the late 1980s Brisbane's inner-city areas were struggling with economic stagnation, urban decay and crime which resulted in an exodus of residents and business to the suburban fringe. Established in 1991 as the Urban Renewal Taskforce, URB was responsible for revitalising derelict industrial areas in inner north-east suburbs of Fortitude Valley, New Farm, Teneriffe, Newstead and Bowen Hills.

URB responses to the challenges of rapidly growing demand of inner city dwelling in a sustainable manner. By focussing growth in urban renewal area, close to public transport and other services, existing infrastructure is used more efficiently and natural areas on the fringe of the city are protected from growth. Carefully planning and design also allows valued heritage and character area to be protected alongside contemporary architecture to strengthen the identity of the local neighbourhoods.

Over the years, several master plans have been adopted to facilitate the redevelopment and maintenance of the area. These include:

- Newstead and Teneriffe Master Plan
- Inner North Eastern Suburbs Master Plan
- Newstead and Teneriffe Waterfront and Teneriffe Hill Local Area Plans
- New Farm, Teneriffe and Newstead Riverside Promenade Master Plan
- Newstead and Teneriffe Waterfront Neighbourhood Plan

Newstead and Teneriffe Waterfront Neighbourhood Plan is a local plan under the Brisbane City Plan 2000. Effective from 2011, this plan contains specific additional local planning requirements for the Newstead and Teneriffe waterfront area. Development principles include conserving and reusing historical buildings for a range of activities.

Under the masterplan, the Woolstore Precinct will continue to primarily accommodate mid-rise multi-unit dwellings and detached residential dwelling, along with small shops, offices and restaurants at ground level. Existing buildings of heritage significance are retained, and new buildings nearby are complementary to their scale, character and setting, maintaining the dominance of the former Woolstores and other historical structures and preserving the amenity of these area.

=== Queensland Heritage Council ===
Established by the Queensland Heritage Act in 1992, the Queensland Heritage Council also helps identify and protect the heritage buildings in the Woolstore Precinct. The agency provides strategic advice to the preservation and management of the historical buildings. Nine Woolstores buildings and two other historical structures within the Woolstore Precinct have been listed in the Queensland Heritage Register.

Four additional structures within the precinct were identified as of heritage importance in the Brisbane City Council's City Plan Heritage Register Database, and are thus preserved and maintained in the new environment.

=== Private sectors ===
The private sectors have been very responsive to the urban renewal schemes in the Woolstore Precinct. Industrial sites and old warehouses were taken up rapidly by property developers at the announcement of URB's strategies in the mid-1990s. Architects were engaged in the refurbishment of existing buildings and development of new sites to ensure all the master plan was strictly adhered to and interventions appropriately implemented. (See List below for details)

== Public reception ==
Although some concerns of displacement have been expressed, the redevelopment of the Woolstore Precinct is generally well received by old and new residents. The new apartments has been popular with young professionals, older 'empty nesters' and interstate migrants, with over 50% of all dwellings being rental properties. Annual rental and capital growth of the property market continue to be healthy in the past years, indicating the high popularity of the area.

== 2011 Brisbane flood in Woolstore Precinct ==
Although the Woolstore Precinct is situated close to the Brisbane River, the severe flood that occurred in 2011 did not cause any major damage to the buildings in the precinct. Even though in the nearby suburb of New Farm a considerable amount of residence and commercial area was inundated during the river surge (and by stormwater backing up drains), only parts of the riverside walkways in the Woolstore Precinct were flooded. All buildings and the major roads of Macquarie Street, Vernon Terrace and Skyring Terrace within the boundary of Woolstore Precinct were located high enough from the highest water level recorded and thus were safe from the flood. River debris were washed up at the end of Commercial Road near the Teneriffe Ferry and also on the walkway outside Eve Restaurant. The Nouvelle Apartments on Skyring Terrace reported some drain backflow problem but was not severe. Some residences at the northern end of the Vernon Terrace and Skyring Terrace suffered electricity loss for a variable period during the flood.

== List of buildings in the Woolstore Precinct Urban Renewal projects ==
Property address	Original building / Area (purpose)	Year built (architect)	Current building (purpose)	Year of renovation (architect / developers)	Note	Buildings today
38 Skyring Terrace	Original Mactaggarts Woolstore (Wool store) / Office building (commercial)	1909–15 / early 1990s	Nouvelle Apartments (residential)	2003 (Nettleton Tribe Architects / Pearson Property Group)	Original building burnt down in 1990	
8 Skyring Terrace	Queensland Primary Producer No.4 Woolstore (Woolstore / warehouse)	1930s	W4 Apartments (residential / commercial)	2006 (Donovan Hill / Pearson Property Group)	State Heritage ID 600325	
70 Vernon Terrace / 139 Commercial Road	State Canning Works (Factory)	1913	The Cannery (residential / commercial)	1998 (Mckerrell Lynch Architects / Winston Group)	Brisbane City Heritage	
53 Vernon Terrace	Mactaggarts Woolstore (Woolstore)	1926	Mactaggarts Place Woolstore Apartments (residential), as part of Teneriffe Wharves Complex	1995 (Cummings and Burns Architects / Baulderstone Hornibrook)	State Heritage ID 600319	
135 Macquarie Street	Original Dalgety Wool & Grain Store (Woolstore/ warehouse)	1906–11 (Atkinson & McLay)	Now part of Teneriffe Wharves Complex		Original building burnt down in 1984	
10–39 Vernon Place, 135 Macquaries Street	Teneriffe Wharves (Transport - Commercial)	First wharf by Dalgaty Co. 1907	Teneriffe Wharves Complex (residential / commercial)	1995–98 (Cummings and Burns Architects / Baulderstone Hornibrook)		
54 Vernon Terrace	Winchcombe Carson Woolstore (Woolstore)	1911 (C.W. Chambers & L.L. Powell Architects)	Winchcombe Carson Woolstore Apartments (residential / commercial)	2004 (Arqus Design)	State Heritage ID 600326	
36 Vernon Terrace	Australia Mercantile Land & Finance Co. Woolstore (Woolstore)	1912 (Robin Dods)	London Woolstore Apartments (residential / commercial)	2006 (Push Architecture / Leyshon Property)	State Heritage ID 600327	
56 Chermside Street	Dalgety & Co. No.3 Woolstore / QLD Primary Producers No.8 Woolstore / Paddy's Market (Woolstore / warehouse / market)	1955–57	Teneriffe Village & Teneriffe Hill Apartments (residential / commercial)	1995–96 (Patella Holdings)	State Heritage ID 600324	
88 Macquarie Street	Goldsborough Mort & Co. Woolstore (Woolstore / office)	1922	Dakota Apartments (residential / commercial)	2002 (Fairweather Proberts / Meridien Pty Ltd)	State Heritage ID 600323	
64 Macquarie Street	Elder Smith & Co. Woolstore (Woolstore / warehouse)	1926–27 (Montague T. Stanley)	Ansonia Apartments (residential)	2003 (Fairweather Proberts / Meridien Pty Ltd)	State Heritage ID 600322	
50 Macquarie Street	Australian Estates No.1 & Mortgage Co. Woolstore (Woolstore / warehouse)	1926–27 (Montague T. Stanley)	Saratoga Apartments (residential)	2003 (Fairweather Proberts / Meridien Pty Ltd)	State Heritage ID 600321	
24 Macquarie Street	Australian Estates No.2 Woolstore (Woolstore / office / warehouse)	1950s	Australian Estates Woolstore Apartments (residential / commercial)	2000 (MBS Architects / Australian Estates Woolstores Pty Ltd)	State Heritage ID 600320	
33–93 Macquarie Street	Capricorn Wharf (Transport – Commercial / Defence)	First built as Stevedoring Co. Wharf 1907–9	Catalina townhouses and detach houses (residential)	2002 (Fairweather Proberts / Meridien Pty Ltd)	Original wharf structure demolished in 2000	
Commercial Road	Newstead Air Raid Shelter (Defence)	1942 (F. G. Costello)	Bus shelter (public amenity)	(Brisbane City Council)	State Heritage ID 602483	
63 & 71 Macquarie Street	Engine Room (former) Capricorn Wharf	1917–1927	Park (public amenity)	2002 (Brisbane City Council)	Brisbane City Heritage	
35 Macquarie Street	Dalgety's Caretaker's Hut	1907	Park (public amenity)	2002 (Brisbane City Council)		
