= Elder Smith Woolstore, Teneriffe =

Elder Smith Woolstore
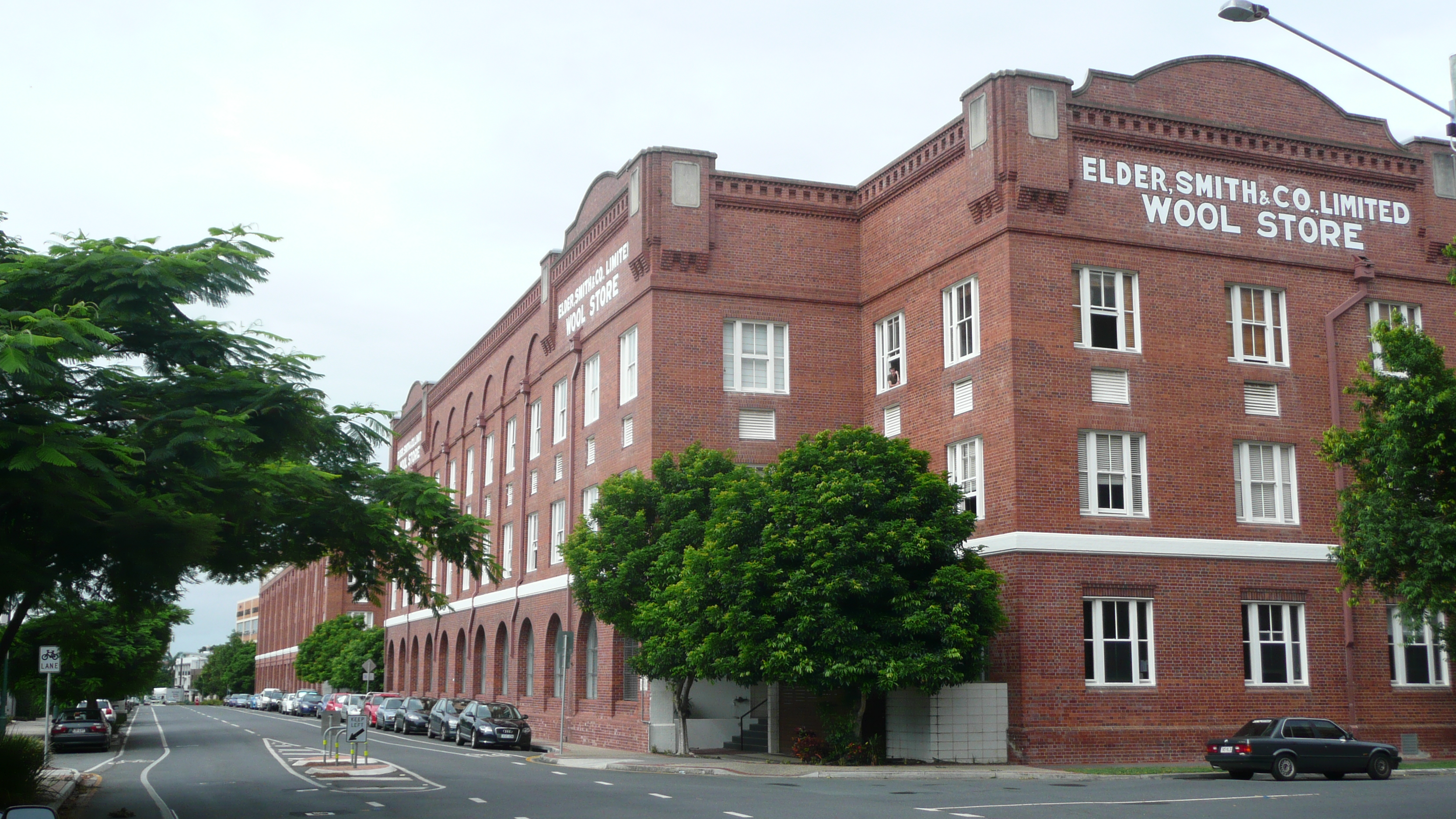
- Elder Smith Woolstore, 2010

- Location within Queensland Location within Australia
- 27.4595°S 153.0496°E
- Location: 64 Macquarie Street, Teneriffe, City of Brisbane, Queensland, Australia

History
- Design period: 1919–1930s (interwar period)
- Built: 1926

Site notes
- Architect: Montague Stanley
- Architectural style: Italianate

Queensland Heritage Register
- Official name: Elder Smith Woolstore
- Type: state heritage (built)
- Designated: 21 October 1992
- Reference no.: 600322
- Significant period: 1920s (fabric); 1926–1983 (historical use)
- Builders: Stuart Brothers (Sydney)

Elder Smith Woolstore is a heritage-listed warehouse at 64 Macquarie Street, Teneriffe, City of Brisbane, Queensland, Australia. It was designed by Montague Stanley and built in 1926 by Stuart Brothers (Sydney). It was added to the Queensland Heritage Register on 21 October 1992.

== History ==
The site of the Elders Smith woolstore has had several important owners, including the Government Resident, Captain John Clements Wickham, in 1847 and James Gibbon (Member of the Queensland Legislative Council) of Teneriffe House. The first building constructed on the site in 1926 was the Moreheads woolstore, the design being by Montague Talbot Stanley, a Queensland architect and structural engineer, with the construction by the Stuart Bros of Sydney.

Queensland pastoralist, businessman and politician, Boyd Dunlop Morehead (1843–1905) founded BD Morehead & Co. in association with AB Buchanan in 1873. This was a prominent mercantile business and stock and station agency, of which Morehead was the chairman of directors. Moreheads was largely responsible for the inaugurating of the Brisbane wool auctions in 1898. Moreheads Ltd continued operating until 1961 when taken over by Elders, one of the three remaining pastoral houses in Australia.

Oxlade Investments, which belongs to the Mayfairs group of companies, purchased the property in 1983 and all three floors have subsequently been utilised by the Wool Store furniture centre in conjunction with the Australian Estates No. 1 Store next door and Australian Estates No. 2 Store.

== Description ==
The Elder Smith & Co. Woolstore is a stylish three-storey brick and timber structure of the Interwar era with restrained Renaissance detail. In keeping with other woolstores and commercial buildings of this period, a tripartite division of base, shaft and entablature is apparent in its functional form.

Constructed in red brick, its arched piers and triple window openings separated by downpipes provide a strong degree of verticality. Nevertheless, the dominant emphasis above and below the upper floors is horizontal. This is achieved by means of a string course surmounted by a rendered frieze displaying the company name and obtrusive post and balustrade parapeting with recessed arched pediments. Another string course separates the upper levels from the ground floor. However, the base of this building is distinguished more by the open arches of its colonnade which provides a covered way for the railway line and loading bays beneath a wide frontal projection. Striking parapet features are the corbelled machicolations and mock turrets.

As usual for woolstores in Teneriffe, the ground floor is concreted and the upper flooring is heavily timbered with posts, beams and joists, the latter being cross-braced by herringbone struts. Internal timber staircases at the front corners and the original Johns and Waygood passenger lift near the entrance lead to the upper floors. Level 2 walkways connected Australian Estates No 1 and Goldsbrough Mort to this structure, but the latter walkway has been removed. The showroom on the top floor has square ventilators with wooden louvers beneath the windows, and the customary sawtooth roof, which is supported by tubular metal columns and aligned from east to west for optimum lighting. The roof is constructed of corrugated asbestos and reinforced glass.

== Heritage listing ==
Elder Smith Woolstore was listed on the Queensland Heritage Register on 21 October 1992 having satisfied the following criteria.

The place is important in demonstrating the evolution or pattern of Queensland's history.

The Elder Smith woolstore is most significant in its own right and for its heritage contribution to the Teneriffe precinct. It reflects important developments, technological features and marketing procedures in Queensland's wool industry since the 1920s as well as the history of quayage along the Brisbane River and of the pastoral companies concerned.

The place is important in demonstrating the principal characteristics of a particular class of cultural places.

In form and fabric, this structure is an excellent example of the broad class of brick and timber woolstores which were built in Australian ports, including Teneriffe, to serve the wool industry. In keeping with two other woolstores of similar vintage (Mactaggarts Woolstore, Australian Estates No. 1 Store), it illustrates particularly well the 1920s stage of development in an industrial process which is now redundant.

The place is important because of its aesthetic significance.

This structure also has considerable visual impact due to its substantial form and unusual design, particularly the internal railway siding, repeated arches and pedimented parapet.

The place is important in demonstrating a high degree of creative or technical achievement at a particular period.

Its special combination of function and style, particularly the railway siding colonnade, was achieved by MT Stanley, who was a fellow of the Queensland Institute of Architects by 1900 and the son of FDG Stanley. He was also the architect responsible for the adjacent Australian Estates No. 1 Store.

The place has a strong or special association with a particular community or cultural group for social, cultural or spiritual reasons.

That this woolstore, with its significant pastoral and business connections, is a valued asset and a riverside landmark, has been recognised by its inclusion in the Teneriffe Development Plan.
