= James Gibbon =

Australian politician

The Hon James Gibbon

Member of the Queensland Legislative Council
- In office 22 February 1866 – 19 February 1887

Personal details
- Born: James Gibbon; 1819 Kettering, Northampton, England
- Died: 1888 (aged 68–69) Kensington, London, England
- Occupation: Land speculator

James Gibbon (1819–1888) was a land speculator and politician in Queensland, Australia. He was a Member of the Queensland Legislative Council.

== Early life ==
James Gibbon was born in 1819 in Kettering, Northamptonshire, England. He immigrated to Victoria in 1852 and became a merchant. In 1860 he came to Brisbane and speculated in urban property. He amassed considerable land, including a large estate at Teneriffe land on which the heritage-listed Elder Smith Woolstore and Roseville house, were built. His own home Teneriffe House on the top of hill is also now heritage-listed. He is said to be the person who named the area Teneriffe after Tenerife in the Canary Islands. He was a member of the congregation of the Holy Trinity Church there.

== Politics ==
Gibbon was a candidate for the Queensland Legislative Assembly in East Moreton in the inaugural 1860 colonial election, but was not successful.

James Gibbon was appointed to the Queensland Legislative Council on 22 February 1866. He held the appointment until 19 February 1887 when his seat was declared vacant as he had not attended Parliament for some years, questions about his non-attendance having been raised as early as 1885.

== Later life ==
In about 1885, Gibbon returned to England, where he died in April 1888.
