= Australian Estates No. 1 Store =

Australian Estates No.1 Store
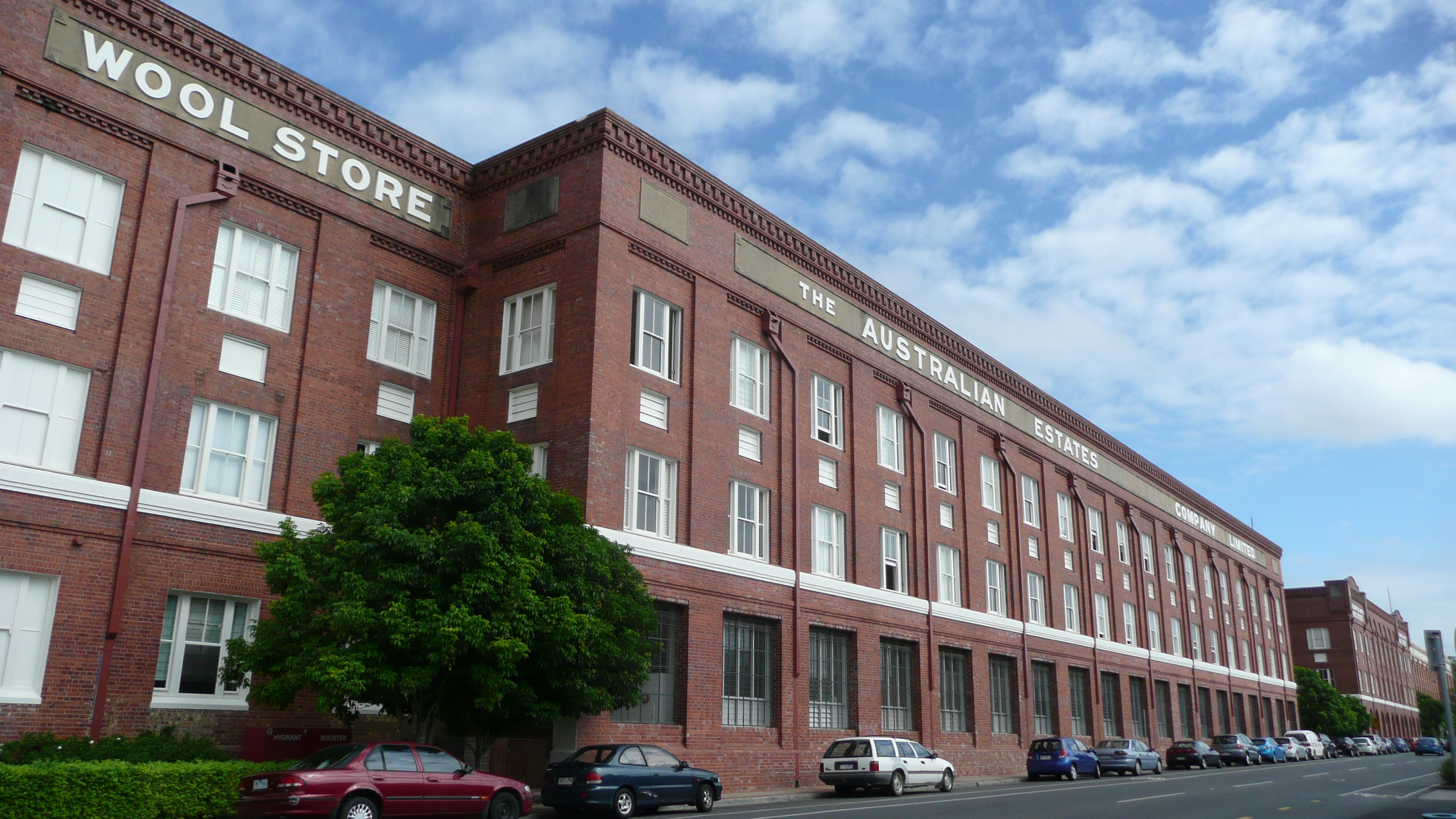
- Australian Estates No. 1 Store, 2010

- Location within Queensland Location within Australia
- 27.4603°S 153.0497°E
- Location: 50 Macquarie Street, Teneriffe, Brisbane, Queensland, Australia

History
- Design period: 1919–1930s (interwar period)
- Built: c. 1926 – 1927

Site notes
- Architect: Montague Stanley
- Architectural style: Italianate

Queensland Heritage Register
- Official name: Australian Estates No.1 Store
- Type: state heritage (built)
- Designated: 21 October 1992
- Reference no.: 600321
- Significant period: 1920s (fabric); 1927–1978 (historical use)
- Builders: Stuart Brothers (Sydney)

Australian Estates No.1 Store is a heritage-listed former warehouse and now apartments at 50 Macquarie Street, Teneriffe, Brisbane, Queensland, Australia. It was designed by Montague Stanley and built from c. 1926 to 1927 by Stuart Brothers (Sydney). It is now known as the Saratoga Woolstore Apartments. It was added to the Queensland Heritage Register on 21 October 1992.

== History ==
Part of the site (lot 3) of the Australian Estates No 1 woolstore was purchased originally in 1847 by the Government Resident, Captain John Clements Wickham. The property passed through the hands of several important companies, namely the Brisbane Stevedoring & Wool Dumping Co. Ltd by 1907, Moreheads Ltd in 1914 and the Union Trustee Co. of Australia until 1961, when it was acquired by Australian Estates.

The other part (lot 4) was purchased by the Financial Guarantee & Agency Co. of Queensland in 1888, and acquired by the Australian Estate & Mortgage Co. by 1926. The design was by Montague Talbot Stanley, a Queensland architect and structural engineer, with the construction by the Stuart Bros of Sydney.

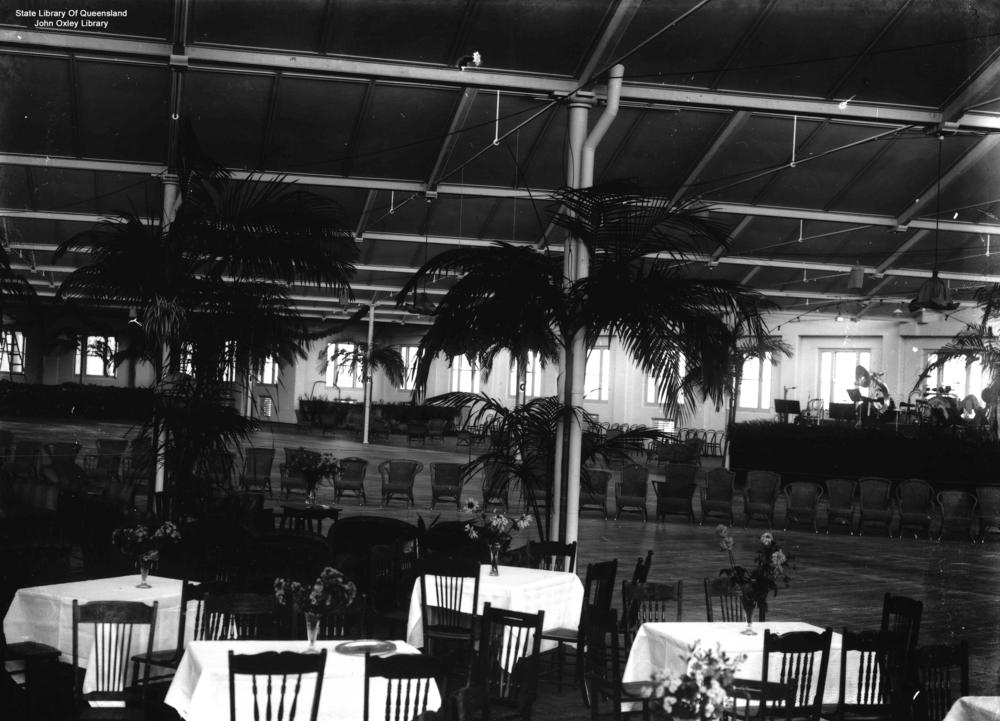
Set up for the vice-regal ball held in honour of the visiting Duke and Duchess of York, 1927

When officially opened in 1927 by the Duke and Duchess of York, this woolstore had the largest showroom in Australia, capable of displaying 24,000 bales. For this reason it was the venue for the vice-regal Ball in honour of the Duke of Gloucester in 1934. In 1978 the property was acquired by Service Nominees (Qld) Pty Ltd, which belongs to the Mayfairs group of companies, and leased in 1980 to Chevron Discount Furnishers for bulk storage and furniture display.

Later it became part of the Wool Store furniture complex in conjunction with the adjacent Elder Smith Woolstore and Australian Estates No. 2 Store. In 1986, this property was zoned in the Brisbane City Council's Teneriffe Development Plan (1986) for continuation of current usage or residential. In 2003, the building had been converted into the Saratoga Apartments.

== Description ==
Australian Estates Co. Ltd No 1 Woolstore with 4.5 acres (1.8 ha) of floor space is the largest single store in the Teneriffe precinct. It is a three-storey brick and timber structure of the Interwar era with restrained Renaissance detail. In keeping with other woolstores and commercial buildings of this period, a tripartite division of base, shaft and entablature is apparent in its functional form.

Its red brick piers and triple window openings separated by downpipes provide a strong degree of verticality. Nevertheless, the dominant emphasis above and below the upper floors is horizontal. This is achieved by means of a cornice line surmounted by a rendered frieze displaying the company name and "erected 1926", and a parapet of decorative brickwork. A prominent string course separates upper levels from the ground floor. However, the base of this building is distinguished more by its piers and openings which provide a covered way for the railway line and loading bays beneath a wide frontal projection. Its angular appearance is ameliorated by a curved and columned entrance porch and balcony which protrude from the southern corner.

As usual for woolstores in Teneriffe, the ground floor is concreted, while the upper floors employ timber posts, beams and flooring and the roof of this building is of corrugated asbestos and reinforced glass. To ensure sufficient level ground for the construction of this store, extensive excavations were carried out and a 64-foot (20 m) high retaining wall of reinforced concrete constructed. Rather than a rear awning for road transport, there is a tunnel running under through the width of the building reducing the ground floor area by 20,000 square feet (1,800 square metres). Inside the front entrance are a passenger elevator and timber stairs providing access to other floors. The second floor includes the usual woolstore offices and client facilities constructed of tongue and groove timber surmounted by opaque glass panels. The showroom on the top floor has square vents with timber louvers beneath the windows, and the customary sawtooth roof which is supported by three rows of tubular metal columns and is aligned from east to west for optimum lighting. Fire protection was provided from the beginning by a complete system of fire alarms. Overhead walkways from Level 2 form a link to the Australian Estates No. 2 Store on the south and Elder Smith Woolstore on the north.

== Heritage listing ==
Australian Estates No.1 Store was listed on the Queensland Heritage Register on 21 October 1992 having satisfied the following criteria.

The place is important in demonstrating the evolution or pattern of Queensland's history.

The Australian Estates No 1 woolstore is most significant in its own right and for its heritage contribution to the Teneriffe precinct. It reflects important developments, technological features and marketing procedures in Queensland's wool industry since the 1920s as well as the history of quayage along the Brisbane River and of the pastoral companies concerned.

The place is important in demonstrating the principal characteristics of a particular class of cultural places.

In form and fabric, this structure is an excellent example of the broad class of brick and timber woolstores which were built in Australian ports, including Teneriffe, to serve the wool industry. In company with two other woolstores of similar vintage (Mactaggarts Woolstore, Elder Smith Woolstore), it illustrates particularly well the 1920s stage of development in an industrial process which is now redundant.

The place is important because of its aesthetic significance.

This Interwar structure also has considerable visual impact due to its substantial form, cohesive design and Renaissance detail, particularly the decorative parapet, frontal colonnade, and covered railway siding.

The place is important in demonstrating a high degree of creative or technical achievement at a particular period.

Its special combination of function and style was achieved by Montague Talbot Stanley, who was a fellow of the Queensland Institute of Architects by 1900 and the son of Francis Drummond Greville Stanley. He was also architect for the adjacent Elder Smith Woolstore.

The place has a strong or special association with a particular community or cultural group for social, cultural or spiritual reasons.

That this woolstore, with its links to important pastoral companies and royal occasions, is a valued asset and a riverside landmark, has been recognised by its inclusion in the Teneriffe Development Plan.
