= Roseville, Teneriffe =

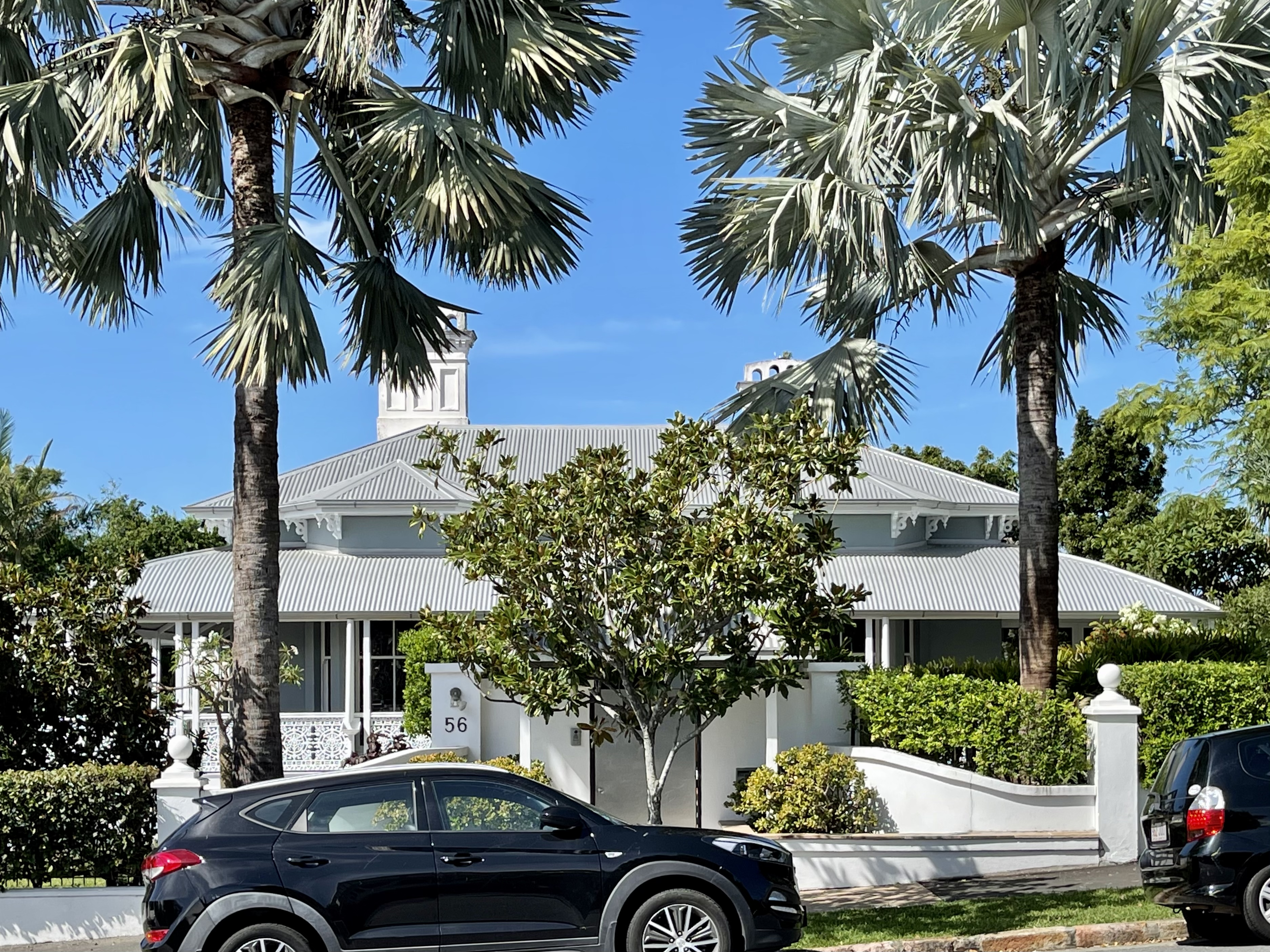
- Roseville, 2021

- Location within Queensland Location within Australia
- 27.4568°S 153.0446°E
- Location: 56 Chester Street, Teneriffe, City of Brisbane, Queensland, Australia

History
- Design period: 1870s–1890s (late 19th century)
- Built: 1886

Queensland Heritage Register
- Official name: Roseville, Uradah
- Type: state heritage (built)
- Designated: 25 June 1993
- Reference no.: 600266
- Significant period: 1880s (fabric, historical)
- Significant components: kitchen/kitchen house, residential accommodation – main house

Roseville is a heritage-listed detached house at 56 Chester Street, Teneriffe, City of Brisbane, Queensland, Australia. It was built in 1886. It is also known as Uradah. It was added to the Queensland Heritage Register on 25 June 1993.

== History ==
This large single-storeyed residence is on the slopes of Teneriffe Hill. It was constructed about 1886 for George Myers, a successful Brisbane china and glassware merchant whose principal store was located in Queen Street. In 1889, he also erected a warehouse in Edward Street (now the Metro Arts Theatre). The site originally was part of James Gibbon's Teneriffe estate. Myers had purchased it in 1885 from architect and newspaper proprietor James Cowlishaw, and it is possible Cowlishaw produced the design. The residence was called Roseville, reputedly because of the large rose garden Myers established in the grounds.

Cowlishaw sold the property in 1887, and in 1891 the house passed to Mrs Ann Cowell, who renamed it Uradah after a family property at Longreach. It has operated as a hostel run by the Society of the Divine Word, and subsequently became Roseville Restaurant. In the early 1980s alterations and additions associated with its conversion to the restaurant included redecorated interiors, new stained glass work and renovated verandahs. A new double-storeyed service building was added at the rear, and the original kitchen wing was modernised. A timber stable building at the rear was demolished.

== Description ==
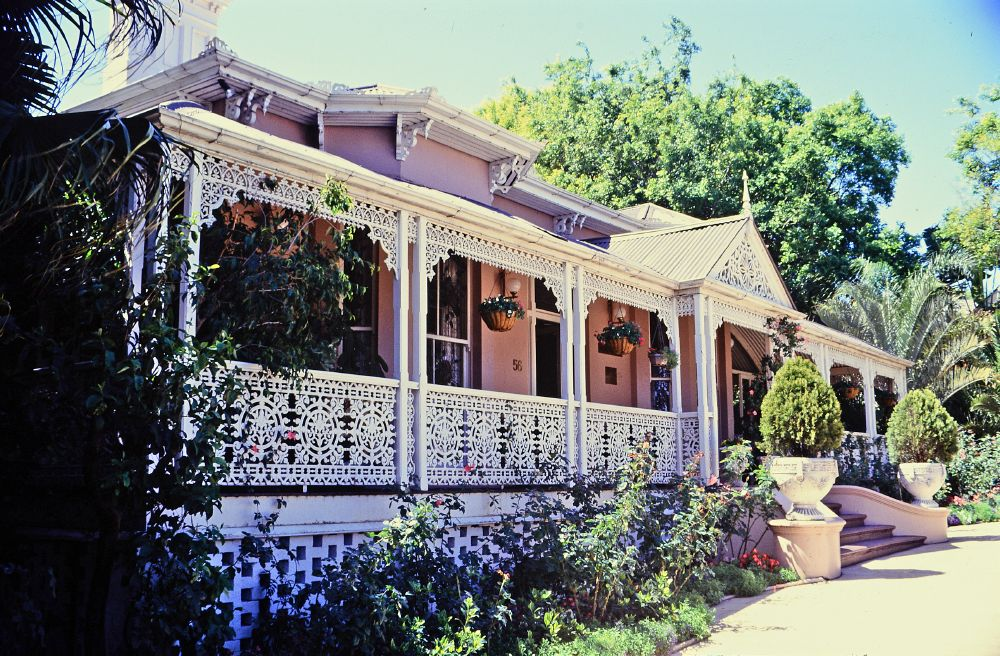
Roseville, 1992

Roseville is a one-storeyed rendered brick building surrounded by timber and iron lacework verandahs. It has a corrugated iron roof, the principal roof being a U-shaped hip trimmed with paired console brackets, which sits above a convex verandah roof. Two substantial decorated chimneys rise above the roof line. A detached rendered brick service building on a stone base at the rear of the house has now been incorporated into the more recent additions.

The southern frontage presents a symmetrical face to the street with a pair of bay windows which are expressed in the roof, and a central entrance. The entrance is articulated with a fretwork pediment on paired columns which sits slightly in relief to the rest of the verandah, and wide rendered masonry stairs with scrolled strings.

The verandah has chamfered twin posts with valances; the eastern portion of the verandah has been glazed. The outer edge of the verandah sits on a perforated brickwork screen with brick stumps, while the perimeter wall of the house itself rests on a stone base.

The rooms of the house run either side of a central hallway; two grander rooms are located towards the front. The entry section of the hallway has a mosaic tile floor. The interior includes four marble fireplaces, a variety of ceiling rosettes, dados and decorative cornices and mouldings. French doors and large sash windows open to the verandah.

Refurbishment included landscaping, and the garden now contains ornamental pools, waterways, flowerbeds and rich vegetation. The main building remains essentially intact in form and structure.

== Heritage listing ==
Roseville was listed on the Queensland Heritage Register on 25 June 1993 having satisfied the following criteria.

The place is important in demonstrating the evolution or pattern of Queensland's history.

Roseville is important in demonstrating the evolution of Queensland's history as evidence of the development of the Teneriffe area.

The place is important in demonstrating the principal characteristics of a particular class of cultural places.

Roseville demonstrates the principal characteristics of an 1880s Brisbane residence.

The place is important because of its aesthetic significance.

Roseville is significant for its contribution to the townscape character of Teneriffe Hill and exhibits aesthetic characteristics which are valued by the local community.
