= William Henry Ellerker =

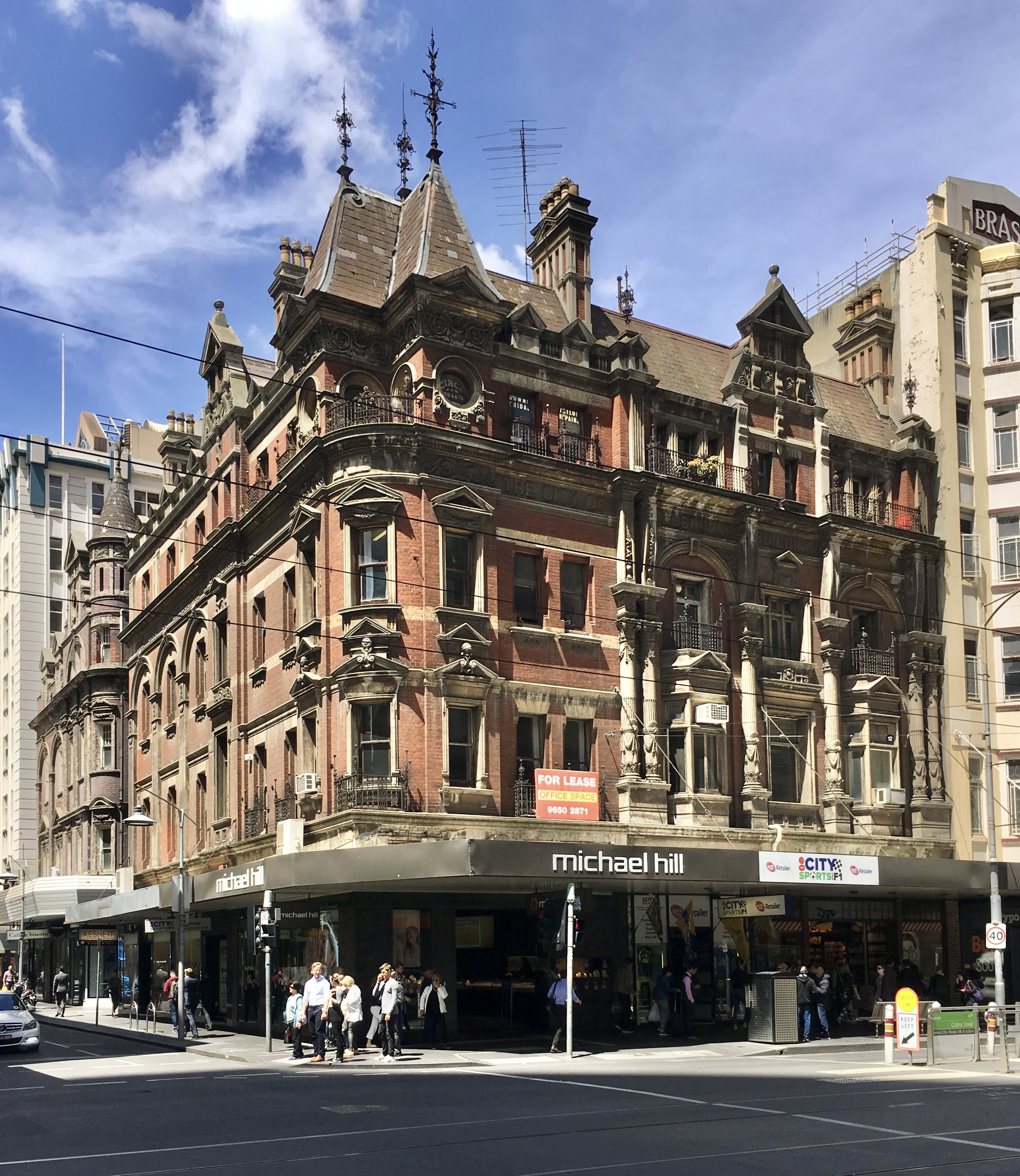
City Of Melbourne Building (Society), Elizabeth Street, Melbourne 1888

William Henry Ellerker (1837–1891) was an noted architect practicing mainly in Melbourne, Australia in the 1870s and 80s, best known for a series of schools and colleges, and houses for the wealthy. He was Mayor of the suburb of St Kilda in 1885–6.

== Early life ==
Ellerker was born in Birmingham, England, on 8 April 1837.

== Architectural career ==
In 1853 he immigrated to Melbourne with his parents, and was employed by architect Thomas Kemp (later Knight, Kemp & Kerr) within a few weeks of his arrival.

In 1857 he was elected as an Associate of the original Institute of Architects in Melbourne, then later as a Member and Fellow, and worked in the Public Works Department and the Victorian Railways.

In 1863, he moved to Brisbane, Queensland and his design for the Queensland Parliament House was accepted in 1864. However, on advice from architect and politician James Cowlishaw, Ellerker's design and all other competition entries were rejected. Amidst controversy regarding the role of Queensland Colonial Architect, Charles Tiffin, in the process, another design (by Tiffin himself) was selected. Ellerker returned to Melbourne in 1866.

In 1873 he was one of a number of architects to win various categories for the design of primary schools, about to be built across Victoria, mostly in a face-brick Gothic style. One design was for single storey school for 500 pupils, with picturesque roofs and round-arched windows, and the 1878 Cremorne Primary School is an example. North Carlton Primary is a far more Gothic design, while Clifton Hill is a more severe red-brick design again with round headed windows.

In 1885 he formed a partnership with Edward George Kilburn, and together they completed a number of notable commercial and residential projects, many now demolished.

In March 1886, he took a 13-month trip to England where he was elected a Fellow of the Royal Institute of British Architects.

Their greatest success was jointly winning the competition in 1886 for the huge Federal Coffee Palace in Collins Street, for which they designed the exterior. Their best known surviving design is the eclectic styled City of Melbourne Building (Society) in Elizabeth Street, completed in 1888. Kilburn also designed the extraordinary mansion Byrom / Goathland in Kew in 1890 (demolished).

They are also noted for introducing the Romanesque at an early date to Victoria, though this appears to have been Kilburn's contribution; he had recently toured the United States, when the firm designed the Priory Girls School in Alma Road, St Kilda in 1890, and the mansion Cestria in Hawthorn of 1891. The partnership was dissolved that year.

== Local government ==
Ellerker initially lived in South Melbourne but later relocated to the upmarket suburb of St Kilda, he took an interest in local affairs. He was the correspondent for the local board of advice for three years. In 1881 he was elected as a councilor in the Borough of St Kilda's North ward, after which he was unanimously elected as Mayor of St Kilda in 1885. During his tenure, St Kilda was part of the redevelopment of Princes Bridge, contributing £10,000. He was also involved in protecting Albert Park from further residential development. When his term as mayor was over, he was presented with an illuminated address in appreciation of his contributions.

== Other interests ==
Ellerker was a prominent Freemason and Orangeman. In 1886, he was appointed a Justice of the Peace.

== Later life ==
Ellerker died on Monday 30 March 1891 at his residence in Crimea Street, St Kilda following a period of ill health. His funeral was held on Wednesday 1 April 1891 at the Melbourne General Cemetery.

== Significant works ==
- 1865: Teneriffe House, Brisbane (now listed on the Queensland Heritage Register)
- 1867 : Dr Barrett's House, Howe Crescent, South Melbourne.
- 1869 : Temperance Hall, Russell Street, Melbourne (demolished)
- 1869 : Residence for James Gibson, Jolimont Terrace, East Melbourne (demolished).
- 1873 : Horticultural Hall, Victoria Street, Melbourne
- 1874 : Alexandra College, Hamilton
- 1874 : Hamilton College, Hamilton
- 1874 : Congregational Church, Howe Crescent, South Melbourne
- 1874 : Temperance Hall, Queensberry Street, North Melbourne
- 1874 : Clifton Hill Primary School, Gold Street, Clifton Hill
- 1874 : Sebastopol State School, Yarrowee Street, Sebastapol, Ballarat
- 1876 : Armadale House, Residence of James Munro, (later Premier of Victoria), Kooyong Road, Armadale
- 1870s : Residence of B. Gibson, Royal Park (demolished)
- 1877 : Carlton Hall, Melbourne (erected by James Munro, Premier of Victoria)
- 1878 : North Carlton Primary School, Lee Street, North Carlton
- 1880 : Residence of C.H. James, St Georges Road, Toorak (demolished)
- 1881 : Protestant Hall, Russell Street, Melbourne (demolished)
- 1882 : Bracknell (later The Towers), residence of Sir M.H. Davies (demolished)
- 1886 : Federal Coffee Palace, Collins Street (demolished)
- 1888 : City of Melbourne Building (Society), Elizabeth Street
- 1889 : Oxford Chambers, Bourke Street (demolished)
