= Teneriffe House =

- Location within Queensland Location within Australia
- 27.4568°S 153.0473°E
- Location: 37 Teneriffe Drive, Teneriffe, City of Brisbane, Queensland, Australia

History
- Design period: 1840s–1860s (mid-19th century)
- Built: 1865
- Built for: James Gibbon

Site notes
- Architect: William Henry Ellerker

Queensland Heritage Register
- Official name: Teneriffe House
- Type: state heritage (built)
- Designated: 14 May 1993
- Reference no.: 600268
- Significant components: strong room, billiards room, service wing, dormitory wing, residential accommodation – main house

Teneriffe House is a heritage-listed villa at 37 Teneriffe Drive, Teneriffe, City of Brisbane, Queensland, Australia. It was designed by William Henry Ellerker and built in 1865. It was added to the Queensland Heritage Register on 14 May 1993.

== History ==
This large hilltop residence was built in 1865 for Hon. James Gibbon, Member of the Queensland Legislative Council and property speculator. The house was designed by Melbourne architect William Henry Ellerker. Ellerker practised briefly in Brisbane from 1864 to 1866. He had initially won the Queensland Parliament House competition in 1864, but it was finally awarded to the Queensland Colonial Architect, Charles Tiffin.

In 1854 Gibbon had purchased about 48 hectares of land along the ridge dividing New Farm from Newstead, and named the property Teneriffe. He resided at a number of addresses, including Eskgrove at Kangaroo Point and Kingsholme in nearby New Farm, until commissioning the construction of Teneriffe House in 1865.

When completed at a cost of £1,715, Teneriffe House was described as a residence of very superior character, occupying a prominent hilltop position from which it could be seen for many miles. It was constructed of rendered brick on a stone foundation, with ten feet wide verandahs on all sides, and a slate roof. Folding doors separated the large drawing and dining rooms, which each measured 18 by 16 feet (5.5 by 4.9 m). The kitchen, pantries and servants' quarters were detached.

In March 1882, Gibbon sold the property to James Cowlishaw for £2000, as Gibbon was intending to return to England. The property was subdivided, and the house on 2.6 hectares was acquired by Brisbane importer Robert W Wilson, who carried out extensive renovations. It is likely the southern wing and the billiards wing were added at this time. By mid-1886 the main house contained a large drawing room 40 by 21 feet (12.2 by 6.4 m), a dining room 26 by 18 feet (7.9 m × 5.5 m), a butler's pantry in the recess leading to the kitchen, four bedrooms, two dressing rooms, three bathrooms with plunge and shower baths, and nursery. The front verandah had been extended to 20 feet (6.1 m) in depth, and all the verandah posts had been replaced with decorative iron columns. A detached rendered brick building with a flat parapet roof, had been erected, and this contained a billiard room, three bedrooms, and a lavatory. The service wing contained a kitchen, servant's hall, three servant's bedrooms, pantry with fireproof strongroom, storeroom and double cellar. The house was fitted with electric bells, and gas was laid on throughout both house and outbuildings. These included laundry, stables, coachhouse, men's rooms, harness and feed rooms, groom's cottage and a four-roomed gate lodge. The grounds were extensively landscaped, and included a fernery and tennis lawn.

Wilson sold the contents of his home in December 1885, and he and his family returned to England. During the second half of the 1880s, Teneriffe House was occupied by GH Green, manager of the Brisbane branch of the Commercial Bank of Sydney. He was succeeded as bank manager c. 1891 by David J Abercrombie, who also succeeded to the occupancy of Teneriffe House. The Abercrombies lived at Teneriffe House for nearly 30 years.

In 1905 Reginald Edward Rowe Hillcoat, a North Queensland grazier, acquired Teneriffe House, and the Hillcoat family resided there from 1919. The interior of the western wing, which may have been the first kitchen wing, appears to have been remodelled about this time. Following Hillcoat's death in 1925, the property was subdivided. At this time the Brisbane City Council resumed just over 3.5 acres, which included the original orchard, for park purposes, with compensation of £1,750 to the Hillcoat estate. This resumption survives as Teneriffe Park.

Teneriffe House remains the property of Reginald Hillcoat's descendants. His wife and one of his two daughters lived in the house until their deaths in 1938 and 1983 respectively, but in the late 1960s, the residence was converted into flats.

== Description ==
Teneriffe House is a large, single-storeyed brick and timber residence located on a hill overlooking the Bulimba Reach of the Brisbane River. The principal entrance is at the rear facing Teneriffe Drive, as the front of the house takes advantage of the river views.

The house comprises four sections:

The core (1865 & 1880s) is a well-proportioned, rendered brick building with a hipped roof of corrugated iron and stone foundations. It is encircled by wide verandahs with slender cast-iron columns. The front verandah is 6 metres (20 ft) deep and has cedar fretwork trusses and a sprung floor. The western, or rear, verandah has been enclosed. Dominating the western facade is a rendered portico with entablature, shaped pediment and decorative urns. Beyond the portico a formal entrance leads to a central vestibule, from which radiate four large rooms with cedar joinery and marble mantelpieces. Wide French doors with tall arched panels of glass open onto the verandahs from the two rear rooms. The large front room is divided by an ornamented archway and folding cedar doors. It has large step-out windows which telescope into decorative timber panels. The main building now contains two flats.

Attached to the southern end of the rear verandah is a small masonry strong room, with a built-in safe. Adjacent to the strongroom, a timber wing runs east to west. This may be the original 1865 service wing. The verandah along its southern side has been enclosed, but that on the northern side survives. This wing has been converted into two flats, but some of the rooms retain c. 1920s timber panelling and plasterwork.

To the south a timber wing (c. 1880s) is connected to the core via the verandahs. Although more modest in scale and materials, it has the same French doors as the core, a double fireplace with marble surrounds, and a small oriel window and folding dividing doors in the long southern room. It has been divided into two flats.

To the southeast is a rendered brick building (c. 1880s) which once contained a skylit billiard room. Built into the side of the hill at a lower level than the other buildings, it has a walk-on flat roof with a concrete parapet or balustrade. Part of the roof structure has collapsed.

Despite the conversion to flats, Teneriffe House remains substantially intact in form, fabric and detail.

== Heritage listing ==
Teneriffe House was listed on the Queensland Heritage Register on 14 May 1993 having satisfied the following criteria.

The place is important in demonstrating the evolution or pattern of Queensland's history.

Teneriffe House is significant for its strong association with, and as the focal point of, the early development of Teneriffe. This large residence embodies structural and stylistic changes dating from the 1860s to the 1920s, in which are reflected changing affluent lifestyles and tastes in Brisbane.

The place demonstrates rare, uncommon or endangered aspects of Queensland's cultural heritage.

The wide front verandah and the detached billiard room with its trafficable roof are rare in 19th century Brisbane domestic building. The core of Teneriffe House remains one of Brisbane's few surviving 1860s houses, and one of the few known Brisbane works by Melbourne architect W H Ellerker.

The place has a special association with the life or work of a particular person, group or organisation of importance in Queensland's history.

The core of Teneriffe House remains one of Brisbane's few surviving 1860s houses, and one of the few known Brisbane works by Melbourne architect W H Ellerker.
