= Australian Mercantile Land & Finance Woolstores =

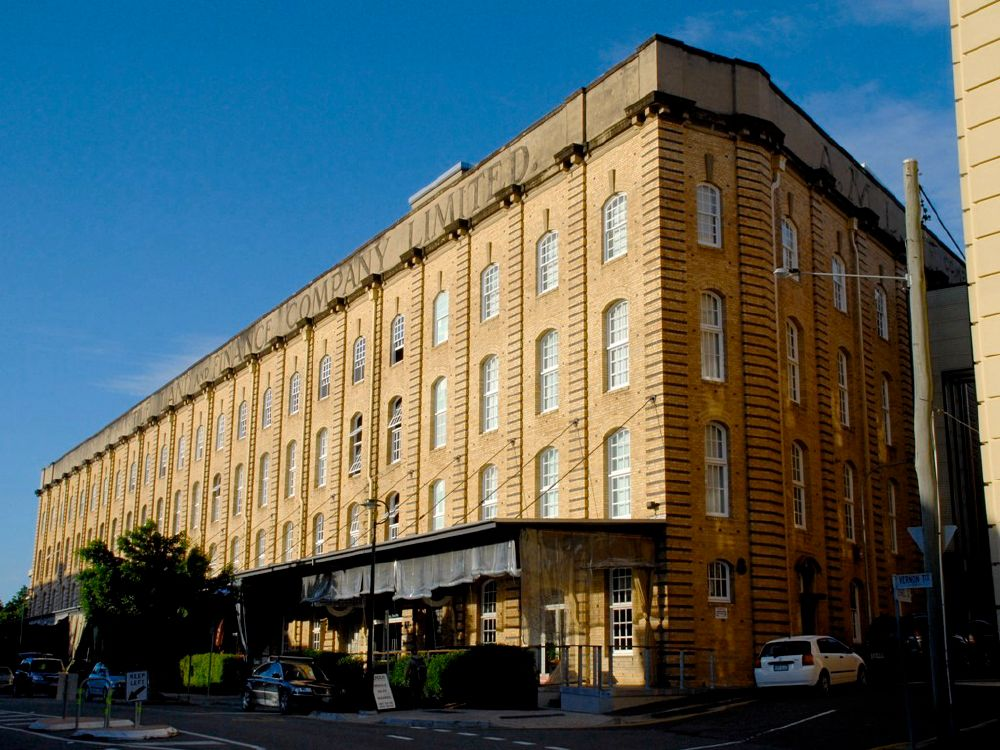
- Australian Mercantile Land & Finance Woolstores, 2009

- Location within Queensland Location within Australia
- 27.4549°S 153.0491°E
- Location: 34 Vernon Terrace, Teneriffe, City of Brisbane, Queensland, Australia

History
- Built: 1912, 1922
- Built for: Australian Mercantile Land & Finance

Site notes
- Architect: Robin Dods of Hall and Dods

Queensland Heritage Register
- Official name: Australian Mercantile Land & Finance Woolstores
- Type: state heritage (built)
- Designated: 21 October 1992
- Reference no.: 600327
- Significant period: 1912–c. 1922 (fabric); 1912–1980s (historical use)
- Builders: Walls & Juster

Australian Mercantile Land & Finance Woolstores is a heritage-listed former warehouse now apartments at 34 Vernon Terrace, Teneriffe, City of Brisbane, Queensland, Australia. Designed by Robin Dods of Hall and Dods, the first woolstore was built in 1912 by Walls & Juster and the second was built in 1922. They were added to the Queensland Heritage Register on 21 October 1992.

== History ==
Australian Mercantile Land & Finance (AML&F), an English-Australian company incorporated in 1863, had offices in London, Sydney, Melbourne and Brisbane by 1910 when its Vernon Terrace land was purchased. The company employed leading architect Robin Dods and builders Walls & Juster to create an elegant but functional woolstore during 1912, thereby taking advantage of the 1910s boom in wool. The original Hall & Dods architectural plans included a second store, which was built in about 1922 to cope with the subsequent boom of the 1920s.

The property was sold in 1980 to Pacific Fire Protection Pty Ltd, which used level 3 for customer storage, while leasing level 4 to TL Tourrier & Co. Pty Ltd Woolstore. The Brisbane City Council's Teneriffe Development Plan (1986) suggested recycling the buildings as a wool exhibition and tourist centre. However, in 2004, the Australian Property Growth Fund purchased the building and refurbished it to create 89 apartments.

== Description ==
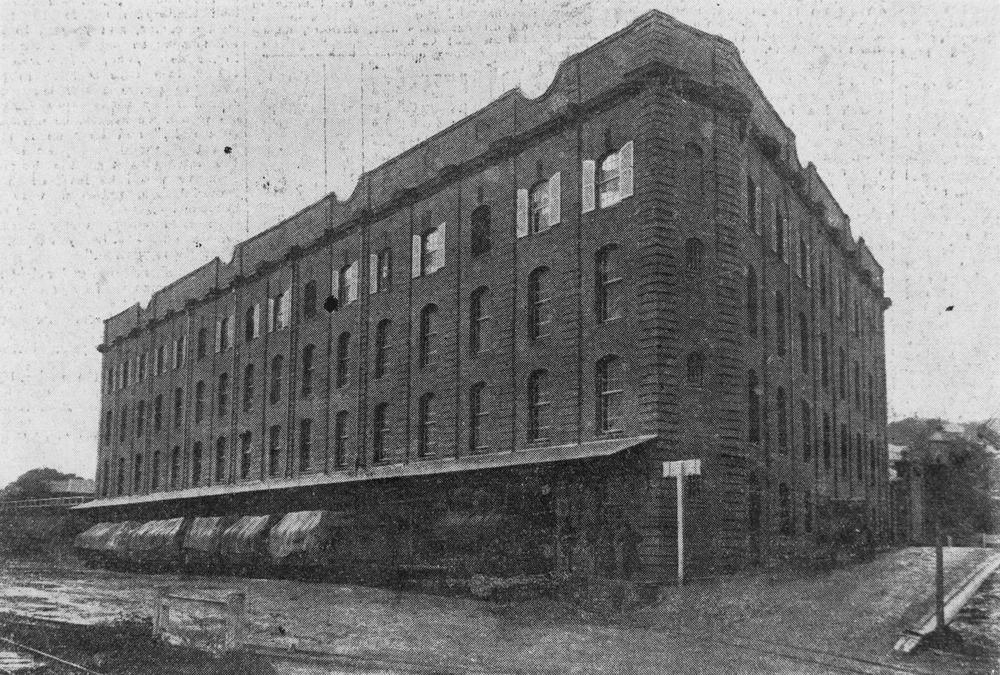
The building in 1913

The original Australian Mercantile Land & Finance Co. Ltd Woolstore (AML&F) is a Federation era, four storey, brick and timber warehouse capable of storing 14,000 wool bales. The common architectural division of base, shaft and entablature is evident in its design and function.

Horizontal rows of multipaned windows are subsidiary in overall effect to the vertical lines of quoined piers which separate the window columns. These piers are decoratively composed of cream coloured bricks alternating at every fourth row with a band of darker hue. Contrasting bricks are also patterned throughout the window columns. The twelve-paned sash windows have shallow arched heads, the top row featuring a brick keystone. They are unusual in being designed to pivot for maximum light and ventilation. An elaborate moulded cornice is surmounted by a simple but dominant rendered-brick parapet displaying the company name in bold lettering and hiding the sawtooth roof behind. A straight corrugated iron awning suspended by iron rods over the railway siding and loading bays emphasises the base of the Vernon Terrace facade.

Around the truncated corner in Ethel Street, the main pedestrian entrance of the original building is highlighted by means of a semi-circular porch with a rendered arch. Further along Ethel Street a set of ornate brick gateposts provide road access to awninged loading bays and a two storey woolstore at the rear, with a similar facade to the original building. An overhead walkway connects the two stores.

The showroom on the top floor has the customary sawtooth roof aligned from east to west for optimum lighting. This expanse is distinguished by the roof ventilators and tongue and groove lining and is supported by steel posts which had 1-metre (3 ft 3 in) timber cowls around their base. The top floor also retains its panelled refreshment and dressing rooms. Other unusual features of this wool store are the use of twin bearers to which the posts were bolted, rather than the usual capitals, and the several sets of stairs that include turned newel posts.

== Heritage listing ==
Australian Mercantile Land & Finance Woolstores was listed on the Queensland Heritage Register on 21 October 1992 having satisfied the following criteria.

The place is important in demonstrating the evolution or pattern of Queensland's history.

This complex of two Australian Mercantile Land & Finance woolstores is most significant in its own right and for its heritage contribution to the Teneriffe precinct. It reflects two developmental stages in the economic history of the wool industry, modifications in technology and changes in marketing as well as the history of quayage along the Brisbane River and of the pastoral company concerned.

The place is important in demonstrating the principal characteristics of a particular class of cultural places.

In form and fabric, these structures are excellent examples of the broad class of brick and timber woolstores which were built in Australian ports, including Teneriffe, to serve the wool trade. In addition the building facing Vernon Terrace is the second oldest intact woolstore remaining in the Teneriffe precinct, and well illustrates the earliest stage of development in an industrial process which is now redundant.

The place is important because of its aesthetic significance.

This woolstore also has considerable visual impact due to its particularly attractive Federation era design and riverside position.

The place is important in demonstrating a high degree of creative or technical achievement at a particular period.

Though not as innovatory structurally as the bowstring Dennys Lascelles Austin Woolstore built at Geelong in the same year (now demolished), the architect Robin S. Dods achieved a combination of function and style in the AML&F building. This is also important because of the dwindling corpus of his commercial work which includes the Wallace Bishop Building, Brisbane.

The place has a strong or special association with a particular community or cultural group for social, cultural or spiritual reasons.

That the AML&F woolstores, with all their pastoral connotations, are a valued asset and striking riverside landmark, has been recognised by their inclusion in the Teneriffe Development Plan.
