= Winchcombe Carson Woolstores =

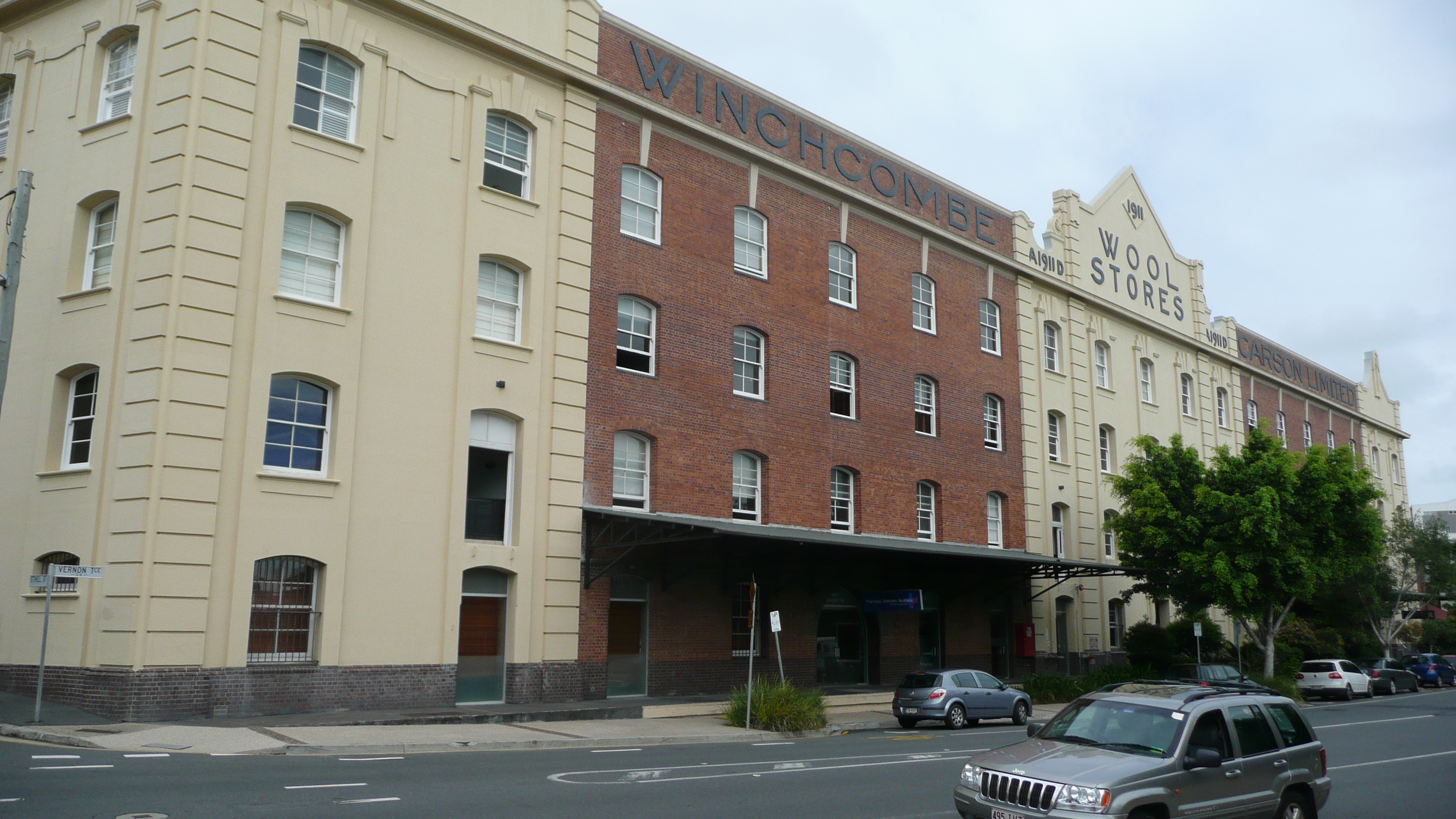
- Winchcombe & Carson Woolstores, 2010

- Location within Queensland Location within Australia
- 27.4543°S 153.0487°E
- Location: 54 Vernon Terrace, Teneriffe, City of Brisbane, Queensland, Australia

History
- Built: 1910–1911, extended 1934

Site notes
- Architect: Claude William Chambers

Queensland Heritage Register
- Official name: Winchcombe Carson Woolstores
- Type: state heritage (built)
- Designated: 21 October 1992
- Reference no.: 600326
- Significant period: 1910–1950s (fabric); 1911–1981 (historical use)

Winchcombe Carson Woolstores is a heritage-listed warehouse at 54 Vernon Terrace, Teneriffe, City of Brisbane, Queensland, Australia. It was designed by architect Claude William Chambers and built in 1910–11 by Stuart Brothers of Sydney who extended it in 1934. The woolstore was added to the Queensland Heritage Register on 21 October 1992.

== History ==
The first Winchcombe Carson building is the oldest extant woolstore in the Teneriffe precinct. Frederick Earle Winchcombe purchased some of the land himself in February 1910, while the remaining homes along the Vernon Terrace frontage were obtained by the company. The building was designed by noted Brisbane architect Claude Chambers.

The Stuart Bros of Sydney built No 1 during 1910–11 and in 1934 were responsible for the rear addition. As the company continued to expand with the wool industry, the adjacent land was acquired by 1955, so that a third store was built and allowance made for yet another. In 1979 Winchcombe Carson merged with Dalgety Australia in Queensland and NSW to form Dalgety Winchcombe. As Dalgetys had moved into a single-floor less labour-intensive complex at Rocklea, the Winchcombe Carson stores were no longer required.

Keita Pty Ltd which belongs to the Mayfairs group of companies, acquired the entire property in 1981. The ground floor is used for commercial and storage purposes, the second and third floors are the RACQ storage depot and the top floors are vacant. Under the Brisbane City Council's Teneriffe Development Plan (1986) the woolstores are designated for a mix of residential and low-intensity non-residential uses, including tourist facilities.

== Description ==
The three Winchcombe Carson Ltd Woolstores are sited on a block bounded by Vernon Terrace and Ethel, Florence and Dath Streets within the Teneriffe woolstore precinct.

No 1 facing Vernon Terrace is an imposing four-storey building with shallow arched sash windows and a substantial parapet. Constructed during the Federation era, its recessed red brick sections are separated by slightly projecting bays at the centre and sides. These are finished in contrasting white render, quoined at the corners and topped by a form of dutch gable pediment. The date "1911" and "Wool Store" are inscribed on the central pediment and the name of the company spans the parapet. Each column of windows per rendered bay is surmounted by a modelled voussoir and keystone arch, while those in the red brick sections are linked to the heavily moulded cornice by means of a stucco keystone. While implementing the common tripartite division of base, shaft and entablature, this decorative treatment of the facade is more evocative of English country houses in the Queen Anne period than a waterfront warehouse with a floor area of nearly 3.5 acres (1.5 hectares) and capacity for 20,000 bales of wool.

A base of dark glazed bricks runs the length of the structure, its horizontal line enhanced by a corrugated iron awning with wooden supports and diagonal metal bracing which shelters the railway siding and loading bays, some of which are arched. An unusual feature of this store are double doors which slide into the brick walls, their width determined by the size of a wool bale. A decoratively moulded central doorway leads into the main entrance foyer and offices which are timber panelled. A large passenger lift complemented by a modern timber staircase provides access to the next level. As usual for woolstores built before the First World War, the hardwood upper floors are supported by massive timber posts and braced by herring-boned struts, while the ground floor is concrete.

The showroom on the top floor has the customary sawtooth roof aligned from east to west for optimum lighting. However, this expanse is distinguished by a forest of slender octagonal columns with fretwork brackets, capitals and strings which support the roof of vertical glass and oblique tongue and groove lining. This floor also retains its panelled dining room, changing room, telephone booths and other client facilities, as well as lifts and chutes. The rear window openings have been enlarged to connect this top floor with others in the adjacent buildings.

The two subsequent Winchcombe Carson woolstores have their own entrances and are brick built, but are three-storey and less decorative. No 2 has tubular steel columns on the top floor, arched windows and louvred ventilator openings. Though connected to the rear of the Vernon Street store, it has an internal loading bay running between Ethel and Dath Streets for road transport. The third woolstore, which was completed in the 1950s, faces Ethel Street.

== Heritage listing ==
Winchcombe Carson Woolstores was listed on the Queensland Heritage Register on 21 October 1992 having satisfied the following criteria.

The place is important in demonstrating the evolution or pattern of Queensland's history.

This complex of three Winchcombe Carson woolstores is most significant in its own right and for its heritage contribution to the Teneriffe precinct. It reflects several developmental stages in the economic history of the wool industry, modifications in technology and changes in marketing as well as the history of quayage along the Brisbane River and of the pastoral companies concerned.

The place is important in demonstrating the principal characteristics of a particular class of cultural places.

In form and fabric, these structures are examples of the broad class of woolstores which were built in Australian ports, including Teneriffe, to serve the wool industry. In particular there is a parallel in appearance between the showroom of the first Teneriffe store (1911) and the Winchcombe Carsons Woolstore No 2 at Ultimo in NSW (1880s, demolished 1974). In addition the building facing Vernon Terrace is the oldest and a most intact woolstore remaining in the Teneriffe precinct, and well illustrates the earliest stage of development in an industrial process which is now redundant.

The place is important because of its aesthetic significance.

This woolstore (No. 1) also has considerable visual impact due to its particularly attractive Federation era design.

The place is important in demonstrating a high degree of creative or technical achievement at a particular period.

Its (No. 1 woolstore) special combination of function and style was achieved by Claude Chambers, a founding member and subsequent president of the Queensland Institute of Architects who also designed warehouse/ commercial buildings for RS Exton & Co., Henry Berry & Co and Finney Isles & Co.

The place has a strong or special association with a particular community or cultural group for social, cultural or spiritual reasons.

That the Winchcombe Carson woolstores, with all their pastoral connotations, are a valued asset and riverside landmark, has been recognised by their inclusion in the Teneriffe Development Plan.
