= Teneriffe, Queensland =

Teneriffe
- Suburb
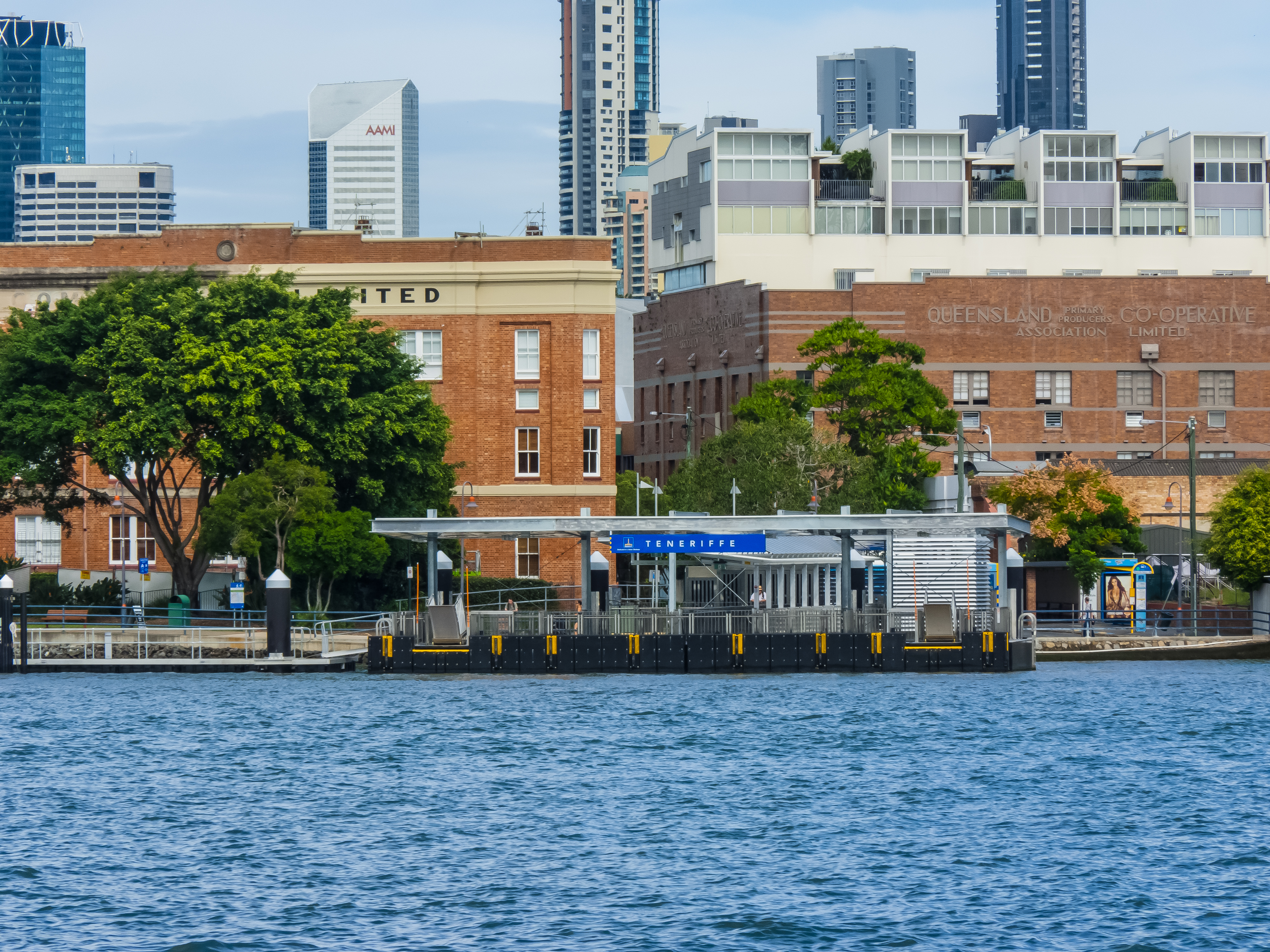
- Teneriffe ferry wharf and wool factories

- Interactive map of Teneriffe
- Coordinates: 27.4572°S 153.0450°E
- Country: Australia
- State: Queensland
- City: Brisbane
- LGA: City of Brisbane (Central Ward)
- Location: 3.1 km (1.9 mi) NW of Brisbane CBD

Government
  - State electorate: McConnel
  - Federal division: Brisbane

Area
  - Total: 0.9 km^{2} (0.35 sq mi)

Population
  - Total: 5,520 (2021 census)
  - Density: 6,100/km^{2} (15,900/sq mi)
- Time zone: UTC+10:00 (AEST)
- Postcode: 4005
Suburbs around Teneriffe
Newstead	Newstead	Bulimba
Fortitude Valley	Teneriffe	Bulimba
New Farm	New Farm	Hawthorne

Teneriffe is an inner suburb of Brisbane, Queensland, Australia, 2.5 kilometres (1.6 mi) north-east of the CBD. In the 2021 census, Teneriffe had a population of 5,520 people.

Teneriffe was once an important wool trading hub and was the location of Australia's largest submarine base in World War II. The suburb was absorbed into Newstead in 1975, but re-established as a separate suburb in 2010.

In 2016, Teneriffe had a generally young and high-income demographic, and in 2018 was one of Brisbane's most expensive suburbs with a median house price in 2017 of over A$2 million. Residents have access to a riverside lifestyle, restaurants and extensive amenities.

== Toponymy ==
One of the first European landowners in the area was James Gibbon. He purchased 48 hectares of land between Newstead and New Farm and named the property Teneriffe because it reminded him of Mount Teide in Tenerife, Canary Islands. Gibbon built Teneriffe House in 1865. The single storey building still stands today on what is known as Teneriffe Hill.

== Geography ==
The Brisbane River forms the eastern boundary of the suburb. lt borders Newstead to the north, Fortitude Valley to the west, and New Farm to the south.

Teneriffe Hill rises to 45 metres (148 ft) in the centre of the locality (27.4569°S 153.0469°E).

== History ==
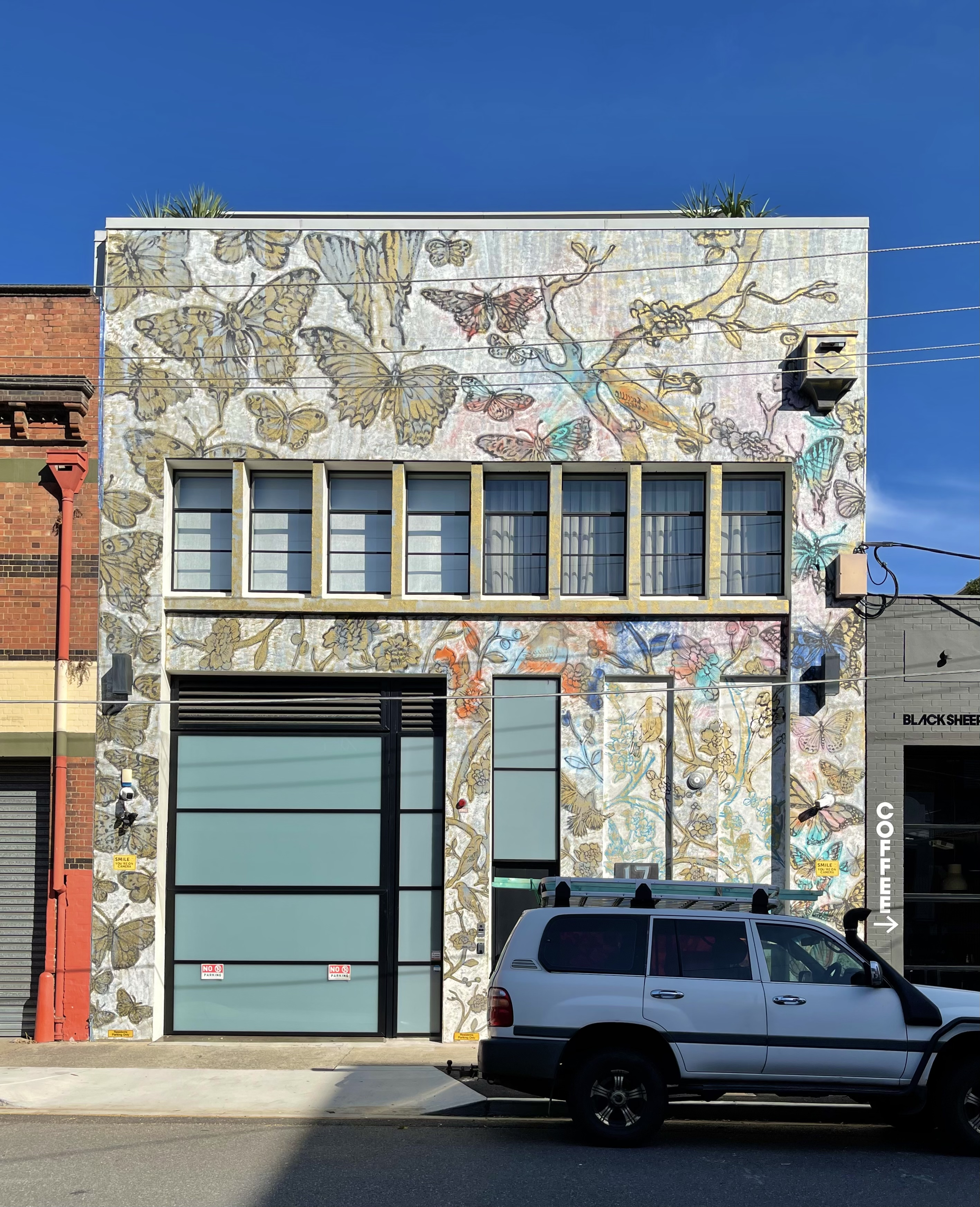
Repurposed industrial architecture found in Teneriffe

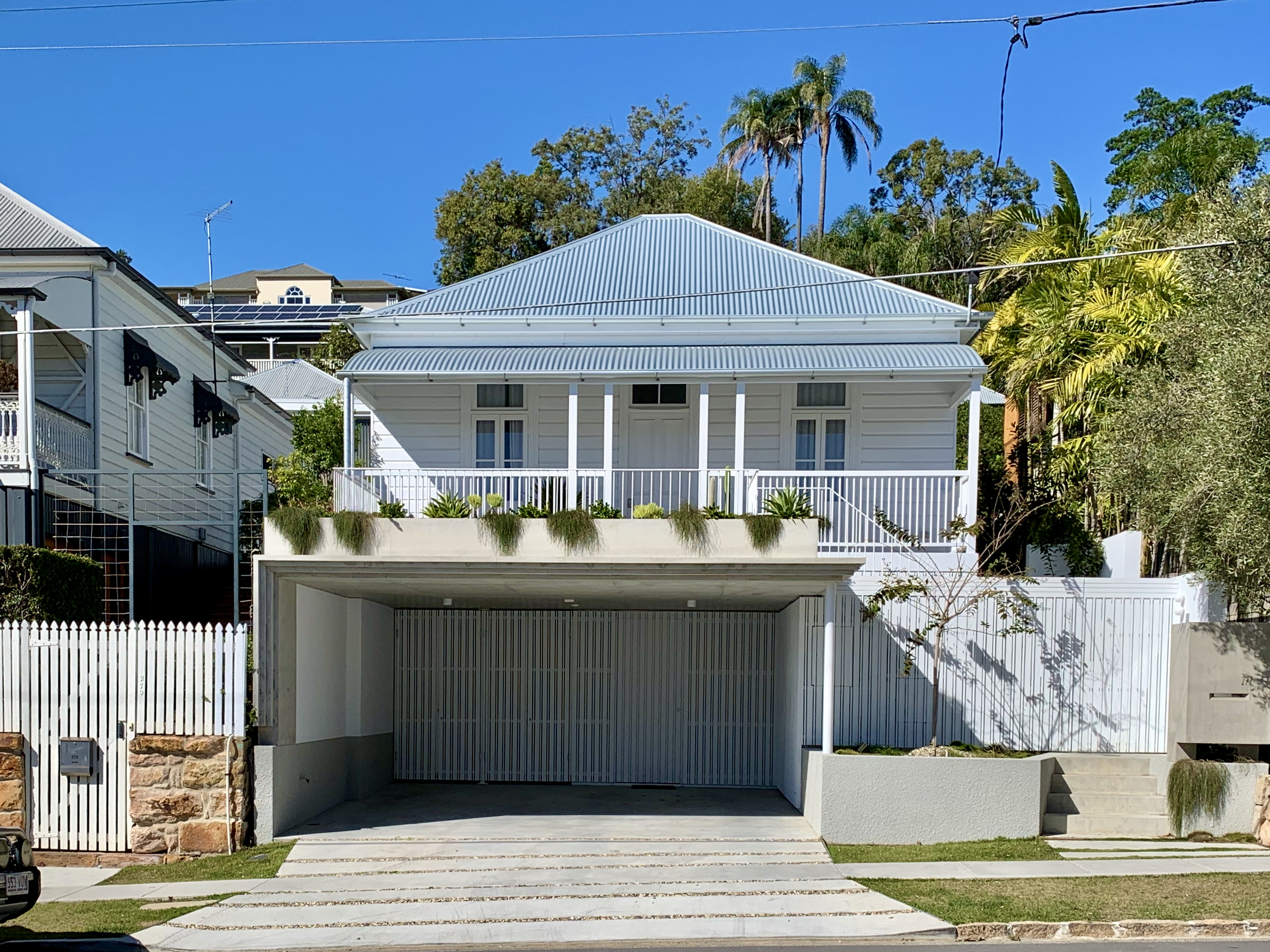
Queenslander style home in Teneriffe

By the 1880s the area was being settled by Europeans. The area was served by horse drawn trams starting in 1885. In 1890 land near Teneriffe House was subdivided and auctioned. The 30 allotments were sold under the name Teneriffe Estate. From 1897 until December 1962 electric trams ran along Commercial Road. Early photographs of the suburb show trams displaying the destination "Bulimba", which has given rise to some confusion in later times. Originally the area was considered part of the suburb called Bulimba which then straddled both sides of the Brisbane River. Postal deliveries were often misdirected and as a result the western section of Bulimba, comprising the area now known as Teneriffe, was renamed before World War I. However, the unofficial use of Bulimba as an address on the northern side of the river persisted for some decades, appearing on maps and in electoral rolls into the 1940s (although its Woolstore No.3 (Teneriffe Apartments) – 241 Arthur Street use progressively declines).

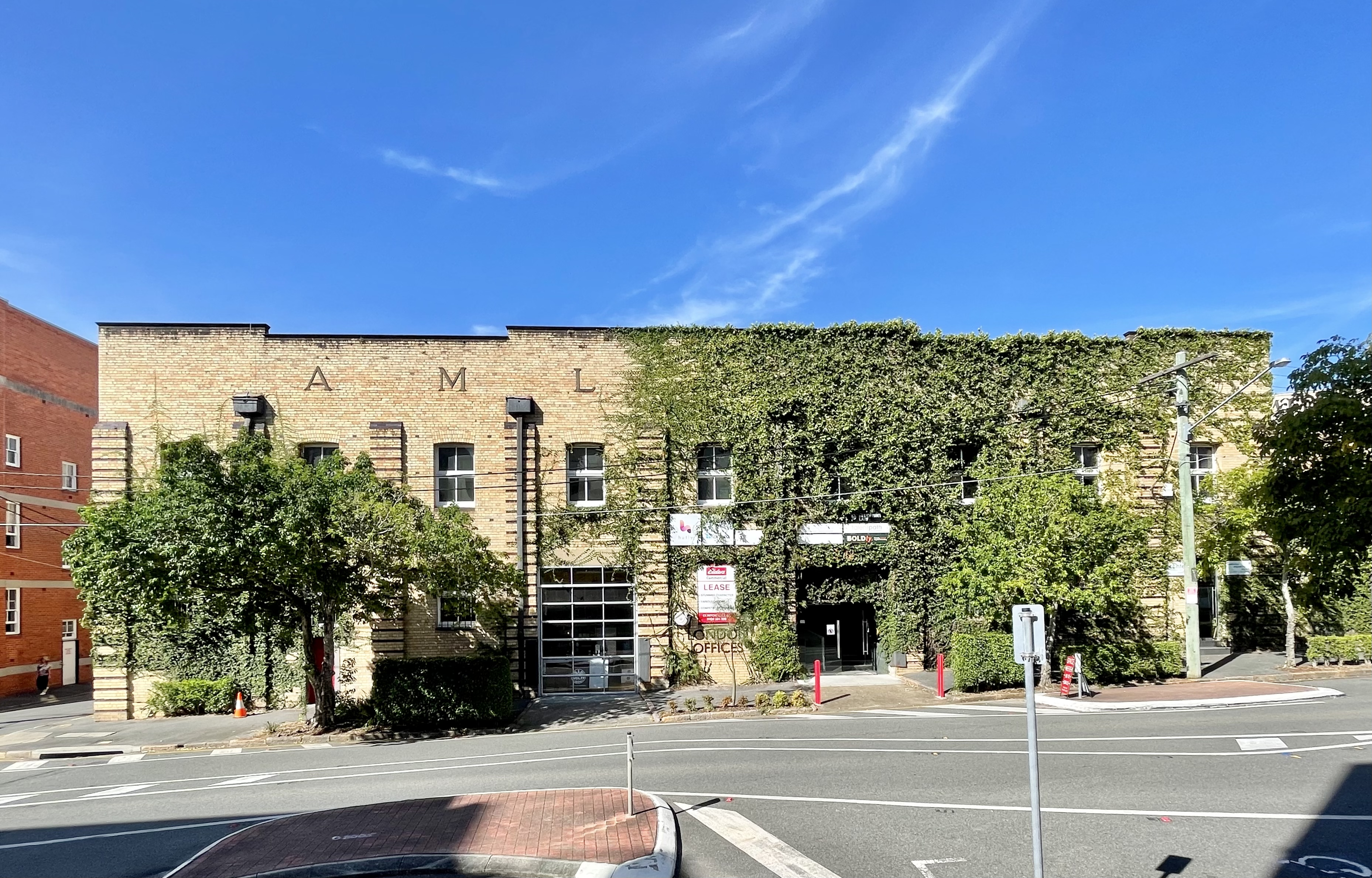
Former Australian Mercantile Land & Finance Woolstores

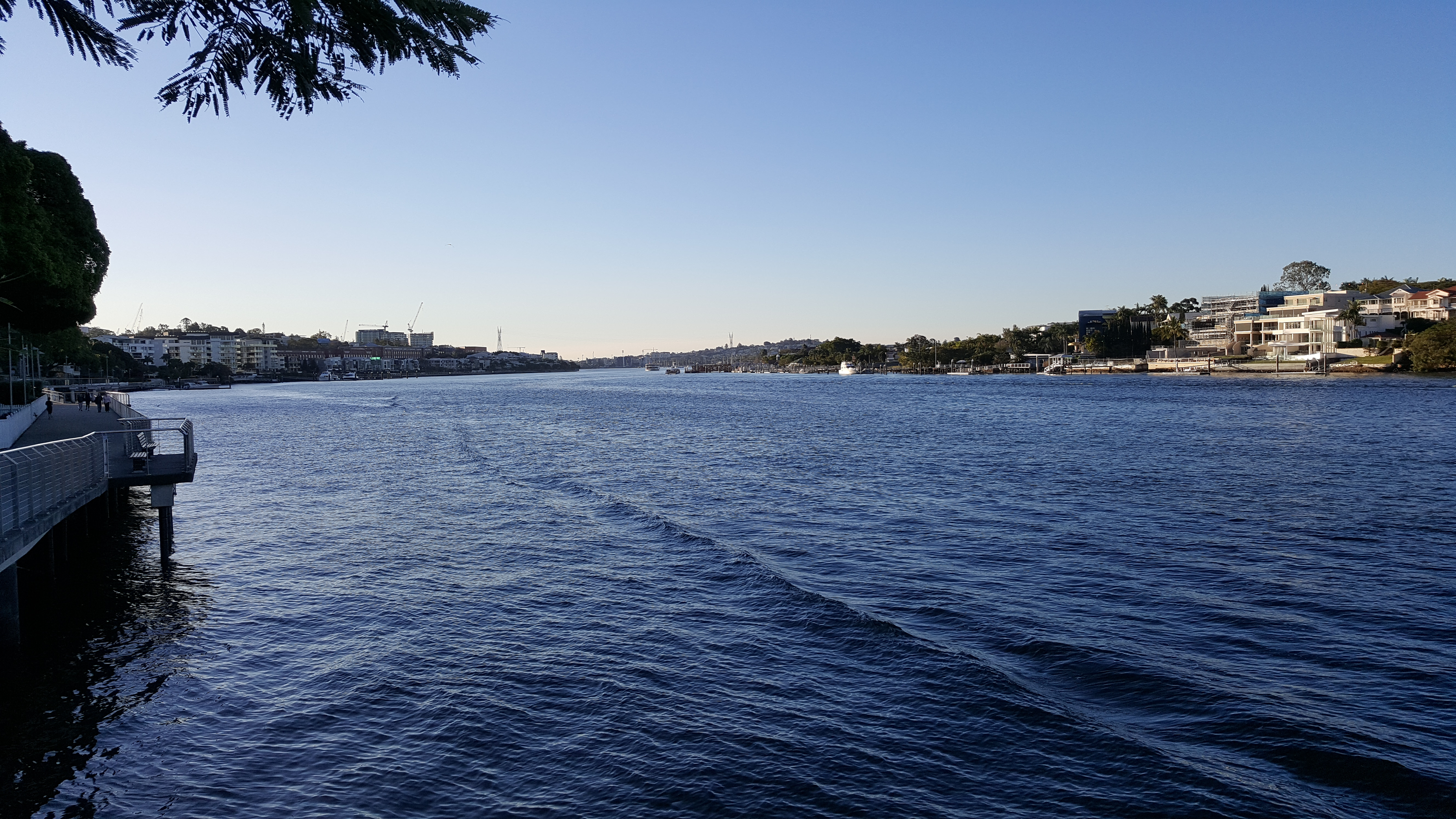
Brisbane River from the RiverWalk at Teneriffe

As wool exports from Queensland increased in the early 20th century, the economic importance of Teneriffe to the state also increased. The first wool store was built in 1909, with another three stores opening by 1915. Another nine wool stores were built, with the last two constructed during the 1950s. Well known architects designed these large buildings to represent the commercial success Australian wool producers experienced in the early 20th century. In 1927, the Australian Estates store was opened by the Duke and Duchess of York. It had the largest showroom in Australia and was able to store 24,000 bales.

During World War II the wharves served as Australia's largest submarine base with around 60 submarines based at Teneriffe. American and British submarines used the facilities, known as Capricorn Wharf up until 1945. As container ships forced cargo shipments to the Port of Brisbane at the mouth of the river wool trading at Teneriffe ceased.

Through the conversion of wool stores and factories to residential apartments, the area has been transformed from a riverside industrial hub to a mostly high density residential area. Most of the Queenslander style homes have been preserved and renovated.

== Demographics ==
In the 2016 census, Teneriffe had a population of 5,335 people.

In the 2021 census, Teneriffe had a population of 5,520 people.

== Heritage listings ==
Teneriffe has a number of heritage-listed sites, including:

- Woolstore No.3 (Teneriffe Apartments), 241 Arthur Street
- Roseville, 56 Chester Street
- The Cannery Apartments, 139 Commercial Road
- Newstead Air Raid Shelter, Commercial Road
- Monier Ventilation Shaft 3, Florence Street
- Newstead Gasworks, 70 Longland Street
- Australian Estates No. 2 Store, 24 Macquarie Street
- Australian Estates No. 1 Store, 50 Macquarie Street
- Elder Smith Woolstore, 64 Macquarie Street
- Goldsbrough Mort Woolstore, 88 Macquarie Street
- Teneriffe Village, 110 Macquarie Street
- Queensland Primary Producers No 4 Woolstore, 16 Skyring Terrace
- Teneriffe House, 37 Teneriffe Drive
- Australian Mercantile Land & Finance Woolstores, 34 Vernon Terrace
- Mactaggarts Woolstore, 53 Vernon Terrace
- Winchcombe Carson Woolstores, 54 Vernon Terrace

== Education ==
There are no schools in Teneriffe. The nearest government primary school is New Farm State School in neighbouring New Farm to the south. The nearest government secondary school is Fortitude Valley State Secondary College in neighbouring Fortitude Valley to the west. There are a number of non-government schools in the surrounding suburbs.

== Facilities ==
The studios of radio station Nova 106.9 are in Commercial Road.

== Events ==
In July each year, the Teneriffe Festival is held as a bold celebration of the suburb's community, history and glimpse of its future; In 2017, the Festival attracted 50,000 people who wandered the suburb's riverside streets and hidden laneways enjoying 25 musical performances and street acts, 40 local restaurants and food vendors, around 60 market stalls and displays, a large dedicated Kids World and dozens of community group stalls.

== Transport ==
The Teneriffe ferry wharf connects it to CityCat and Cross River services.

== See also ==
- List of Brisbane suburbs
- Urban renewal in Woolstore precinct, Teneriffe
