= Australian Estates No. 2 Store =

Australian Estates No.2 Store
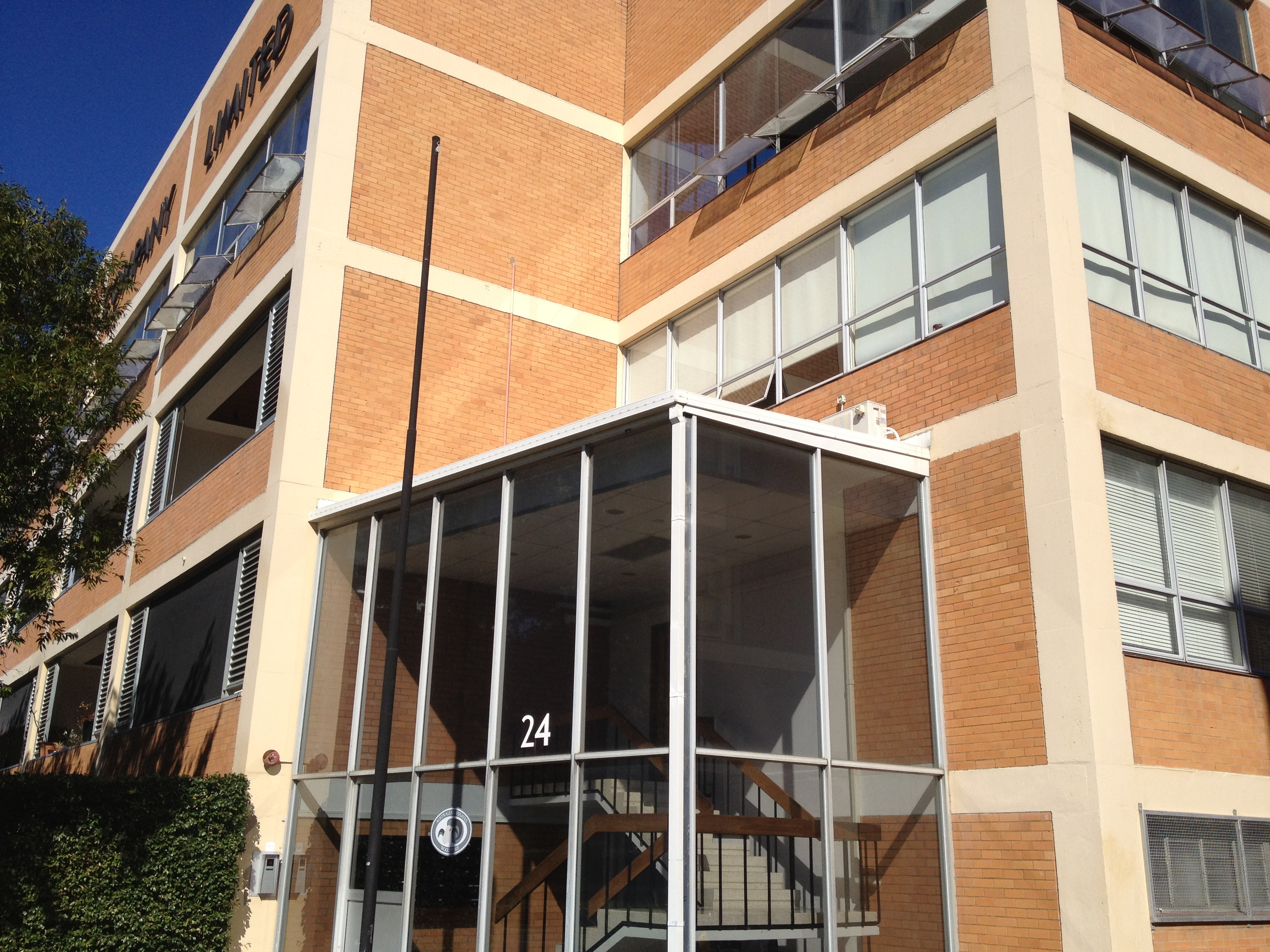
- Australian Estates No. 2 Store, 2012

- Location within Queensland Location within Australia
- 27.4613°S 153.0496°E
- Location: 24 Macquarie Street, Teneriffe, City of Brisbane, Queensland, Australia

History
- Design period: 1940s–1960s (post-World War II)
- Built: c. 1957

Site notes
- Architectural style: Modernism

Queensland Heritage Register
- Official name: Australian Estates No.2 Store
- Type: state heritage (built)
- Designated: 21 October 1992
- Reference no.: 600320
- Significant period: 1950s (fabric); 1950s–c. 1978 (historical use)

Australian Estates No. 2 Store is a heritage-listed former warehouse and now apartments at 24 Macquarie Street, Teneriffe, City of Brisbane, Queensland, Australia. It was built c. 1957. It was added to the Queensland Heritage Register on 21 October 1992.

== History ==
Australian Estates purchased most of the homes on the site between 1955 and 1959. With the advent of their modern woolstore, the company utilised the top floor as their main showroom rather than their adjacent 1920s building (Australian Estates No. 1 Store). In 1978 the property was sold to Service Nominees, one of the Mayfairs group of companies, which leased the floors to various tenants.

In 1986, the Brisbane City Council's Development Plan (1986) zoned the building to enable residential use. By 2014, the building had been converted to apartments, including an additional floor of apartments by removing the original roof.

== Description ==
Australian Estates Co. Ltd No 2 Woolstore, which is built into the side of Teneriffe Hill, comprises four floors, in two sections with expansion joins to allow for climatic changes. It was erected during the Postwar era and is International in architectural style. Several features suggest significant deviations in woolstore design and construction during this last phase of development at Teneriffe.

== Heritage listing ==
Australian Estates No.2 Store was listed on the Queensland Heritage Register on 21 October 1992 having satisfied the following criteria.

The place is important in demonstrating the evolution or pattern of Queensland's history.

Australian Estates No 2 woolstore is most significant in its own right and for its heritage contribution to the Teneriffe precinct. It reflects important developments, technological features and marketing procedures in Queensland's wool industry, as well as the history of commerce along the Brisbane River and of the pastoral company concerned. Built at the end of the affluent fifties when wool prices were high and 'Australia rode on the sheep's back', the company showed confidence in the economic future.

The place demonstrates rare, uncommon or endangered aspects of Queensland's cultural heritage.

In form and fabric, this structure is a rare example of the broad class of brick, concrete and steel woolstores which were built in Australian ports, including Teneriffe, to serve the wool industry after the war; it was also the last of the labour-intensive, multi-storeyed woolstores in Australia.

The place is important in demonstrating the principal characteristics of a particular class of cultural places.

In keeping with one other woolstore of similar vintage (Teneriffe Village), this illustrates particularly well the final postwar stage of development in an industrial process and associated building form which are now superseded; though more so since this was the only Queensland store to employ large wool bale modules and fully utilise 1950s technology, and as the only woolstore to rely exclusively on road transport.

The place is important because of its aesthetic significance.

This structure also has considerable visual impact due to its substantial form and International style, including the recessed corner entrance and expressed concrete frame. Though similar in function to earlier woolstores, this one is significantly different in style and detail.

The place is important in demonstrating a high degree of creative or technical achievement at a particular period.

In keeping with one other woolstore of similar vintage (Teneriffe Village), this illustrates particularly well the final postwar stage of development in an industrial process and associated building form which are now superseded; though more so since this was the only Queensland store to employ large wool bale modules and fully utilise 1950s technology, and as the only woolstore to rely exclusively on road transport.

The place has a strong or special association with a particular community or cultural group for social, cultural or spiritual reasons.

That this woolstore, with its significant pastoral and business connections, is a valued asset and a local landmark along the riverside has been recognised by its inclusion in the Teneriffe Development Plan.
