= Mactaggarts Woolstore =

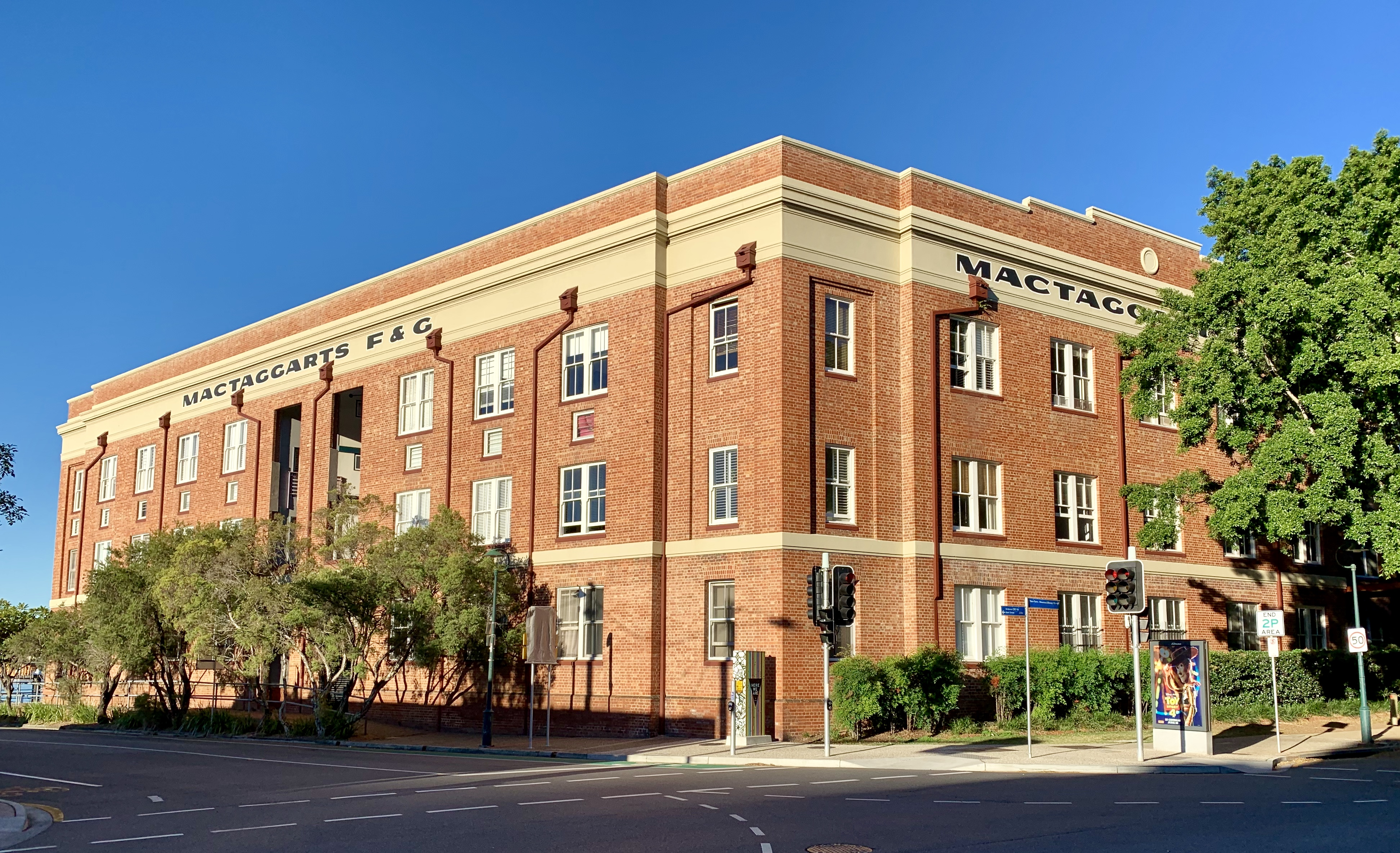
- Mactaggarts Woolstore, 2014

- Location within Queensland Location within Australia
- 27.4532°S 153.0492°E
- Location: 53 Vernon Terrace, Teneriffe, City of Brisbane, Queensland, Australia

History
- Design period: 1919–1930s (interwar period)
- Built: 1926

Queensland Heritage Register
- Official name: Mactaggarts Woolstore (former)
- Type: state heritage (built)
- Designated: 21 October 1992
- Reference no.: 600319
- Significant period: 1920s (fabric); 1926–1980s (historical use)
- Builders: Stuart Brothers (Sydney)

Mactaggarts Woolstore is a heritage-listed wool warehouse at 53 Vernon Terrace, Teneriffe, City of Brisbane, Queensland, Australia. It was built in 1926 by Stuart Brothers (Sydney). It was added to the Queensland Heritage Register on 21 October 1992.

== History ==
The Mactaggart's Woolstore was built in 1926 for the New Zealand Loan and Mercantile Agency Company, one of some sixteen woolstores erected in the first half of the twentieth century along the Brisbane River at Teneriffe. From the mid-1960s the woolstores and their associated wharves were in decline, and many of the woolstores were sold as development sites.

== Description ==
The warehouse is a large building on the edge of the Brisbane River, on the corner of Vernon Terrace and Commercial Rd, within the Woolstores group. It is rectangular, three-storeyed and built of brick, with regularly-spaced windows. The interior was the most intact of any of the woolstores, with wide areas of unpartitioned space and intact fittings. It was converted into apartments in 1995.
