= Goldsbrough =

Goldsbrough is a surname. Notable people with the surname include:

- George Ridsdale Goldsbrough (1881–1963), English mathematician and mathematical physicist
- Richard Goldsbrough (1821–1886), English-born Australian businessman

== See also ==
- Goldsborough (disambiguation)
- Goldsbrough Mort & Co., a former Australian agribusiness
  - Goldsbrough House, Adelaide, an office building (now part of Myer Centre)
  - Goldsbrough Mort Woolstore, a heritage-listed building in Brisbane, Queensland
  - Goldsbrough Mort Building, Rockhampton, a heritage-listed building in Queensland
- Goldsbrough Orchestra, former name of the English Chamber Orchestra
