= Woolstore =

Woolstore or Woolstores may refer to:

- Australian Mercantile Land & Finance Woolstores, Brisbane, Queensland, Australia
- Elder Smith Woolstore, Teneriffe, Brisbane, Queensland, Australia
- Fremantle Woolstores
- Goldsbrough Mort Woolstore, Brisbane, Queensland, Australia
- Mactaggarts Woolstore, Brisbane, Queensland, Australia
- Queensland Primary Producers No 4 Woolstore, Brisbane, Queensland, Australia
- The Old Woolstore Apartment Hotel, Hobart
- Winchcombe Carson Woolstores, Brisbane, Queensland, Australia

== See also ==
- Australian Estates No. 1 Store, Brisbane, Queensland, Australia
- Australian Estates No. 2 Store, Brisbane, Queensland, Australia
- Goldsbrough Mort Building, Rockhampton, Queensland, Australia
- Teneriffe Village, Brisbane, Queensland, Australia
