= Frederick Wolseley =

Australian Inventor

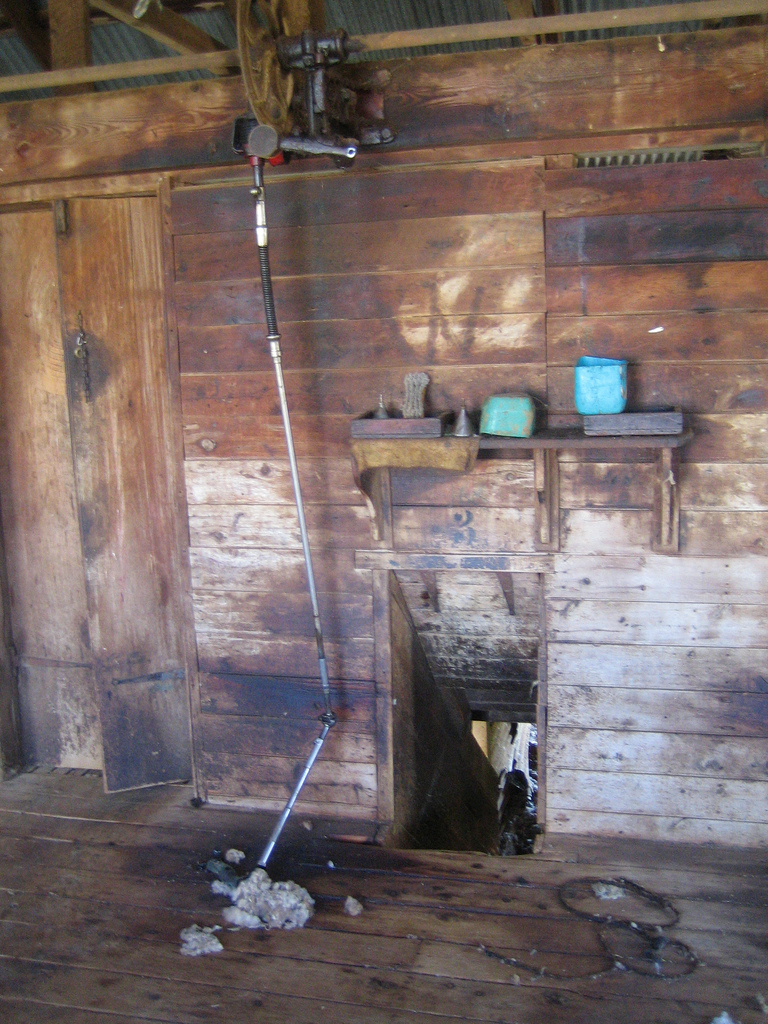
A shearing stand machine

Frederick York Wolseley (16 March 1837 – 8 January 1899) was an Irish-born New South Wales inventor and woolgrower who invented and developed the first commercially successful sheep shearing machinery after extensive experimentation. It revolutionised the wool industry.

The former Murray Shire Council erected a monument to him where he lived at the time, referring to his invention: "It has become part of the rich history of the wool industry and is now perpetuated in poem and song."

== Family ==
Born in Kingstown (now Dún Laoghaire) in County Dublin Ireland, Frederick was the third son of the seven surviving children of Major Garnet Joseph Wolseley (1780–1840) of The King's Own Scottish Borderers (25th Foot) and of the family of Mount Wolseley, co. Carlow, and Frances Anne (1801–1883) daughter of William Smith of Dublin. His eldest brother became Field Marshal Wolseley and a hero of the Victorian era, another brother became General Sir George Wolseley. Their father died in 1840 leaving their mother little more than his army pension and the brothers were educated at the local day school instead of being sent to England. The seven children remained close-knit throughout their lives.

He married his nurse, Ellen Elizabeth Clarke (1850–1922), in Melbourne in 1892. She looked after him through his long final illness. They had no children.

== Pastoralist and inventor ==
Frederick Wolseley, unassisted, went to Melbourne from Ireland, arriving in July 1854, aged 17, to be a jackaroo on his future brother-in-law's sheep station. His sister Fanny's husband, Gavin Ralston Caldwell, they married in Dublin in 1857, held Thule, on the Murray River, and later added nearby Cobran near Deniliquin; both stations were in New South Wales.

Caldwell died in 1868. About that time, Wolseley set to work developing his ideas for a sheep shearing machine. By 1872, he had created a working model. He returned from a visit to England and Ireland in 1874 and continued development in Melbourne with Richard Park & Co, an engineering business where a few years later Herbert Austin, a new immigrant from England, was to serve an apprenticeship. Austin's uncle was works manager.

Having acquired an interest in them, Wolseley lived on Cobran and Thule until 1876, 22 years in the same district. In 1871, he acquired Toolong in the Murrumbidgee district, five years later another property, Euroka near Walgett. Now living at Euroka, he continued testing and on 28 March 1877 he and Robert Savage (1818–1888), the inventor of various items of mining and agricultural machinery, were granted a patent. Another patent was granted in December; however their machine was not a success and Wolseley continued to work on it but without Savage. He made further developments with Richard Pickup Park, and they patented an 'Improved Shearing Apparatus' on 13 December 1884.

The following year, Wolseley bought John Howard's rights to his horse clipper and hired him to work as a mechanic on his Euroka station. There Howard made improvements that were so effective that Wolseley began public demonstrations in Sydney and at Euroka. A William Ryley made suggestions for improving the handpiece. In 1887–1888, demonstrations were arranged throughout eastern Australia and New Zealand. The culmination was the first complete shearing by machinery which took place at Sir Samuel McCaughey's woolshed at Dunlop, Louth, N.S.W. and that year, 1888, eighteen more woolsheds were equipped with Wolseley machinery.

During 1887, Herbert Austin joined, as chief engineer, Wolseley Sheep Shearing Machine Company Limited, incorporated in Sydney, a new business linked to R G Parks & Co, to make Wolseley's machinery in his workshops at Goldsbrough Mort & Co. Ltd, Melbourne. This company was wound up in 1889 and ownership transferred to a new British company, The Wolseley Sheep Shearing Machine Company incorporated in London with a capital of £200,000. Operations remained in Australia, Austin studied the machinery while it was in use on sheep stations and made further patented improvements. Meanwhile Wolseley again visited England leaving Austin in charge.

By 1893 they were facing a crisis when it was discovered they had sold a large amount of defective machinery, brought about by the failure of local suppliers to meet the required specifications. It was decided to leave John Howard in charge in Australia and send Austin to open up an operation in England. In November 1893, Wolseley and Austin arrived there, Austin to manage the business from a small workshop in Broad Street, Birmingham.

Handsome, likeable and well-built, Wolseley was obliged to buy the engineering knowledge and experience to bring his ideas to fruition. His perseverance led to his machinery revolutionising the wool industry. Handicapped throughout his final ten years by his battle with cancer, he resigned as managing director of his company in 1894 and made what proved to be a brief return to Australia. Going back to England that same year for specialised treatment, he remained there, where he died aged 61 on 8 January 1899 at The Red House, Belvedere Road, Norwood, Surrey, and was buried at Beckenham cemetery.

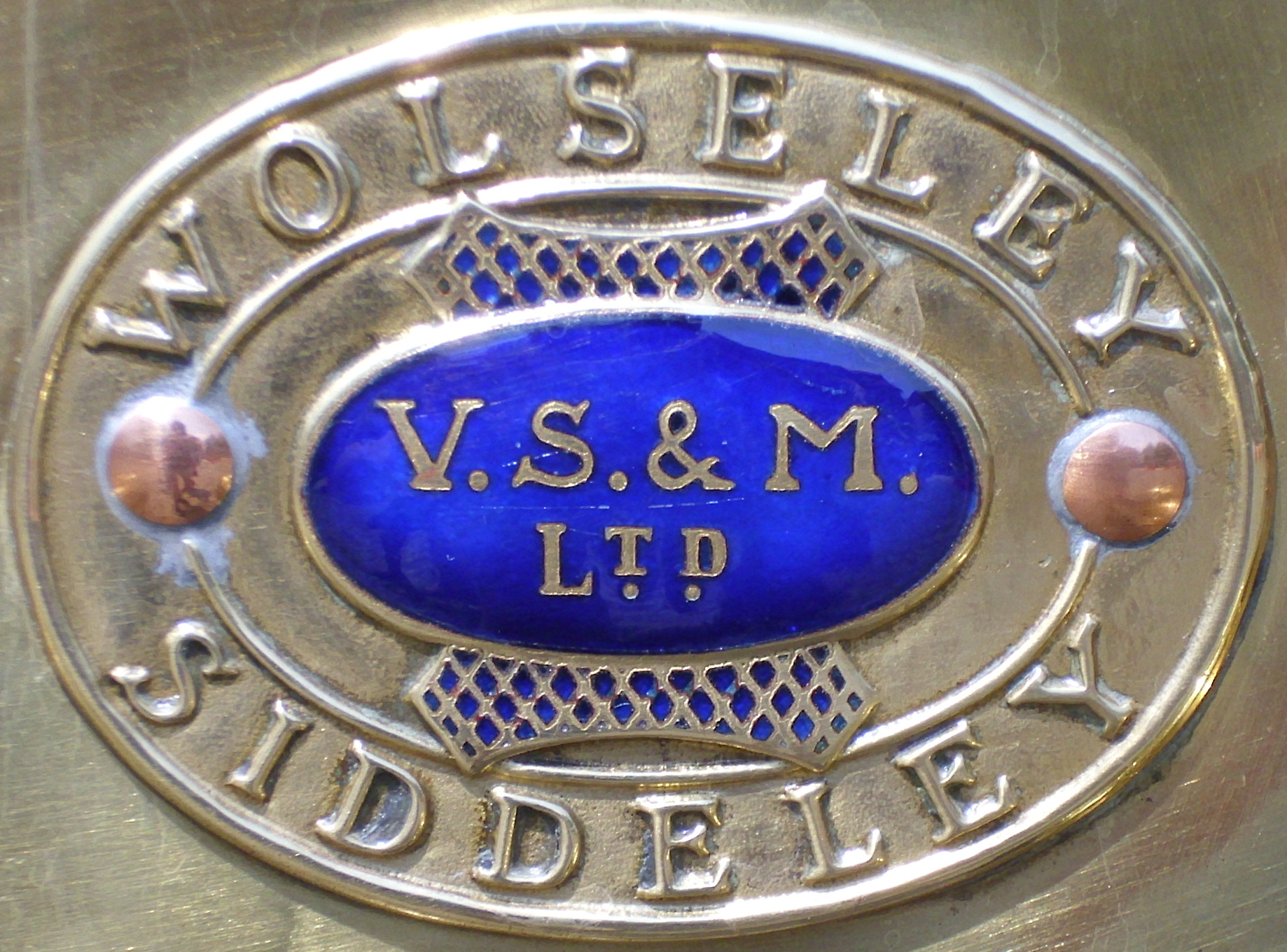
Name plate: Vickers, Sons & Maxim

=== Cars ===
In the second half of the 1890s, Austin turned his attention to car manufacture as a way of stabilising the Wolseley business's inherent seasonal fluctuations. His first attempts were among the pioneer motorcars of Britain, but they were not produced commercially until the Wolseley directors lost interest in the venture and shortly after Wolseley's death Vickers, Sons and Maxim took over the embryo business, Austin and the Wolseley name. This new business was incorporated with the name The Wolseley Tool & Motor Car Company Limited. After less than five years there, Austin set out on his own and built himself The Austin Motor Company Limited at Longbridge, Birmingham.

== Wolseley's machine ==
The machine clips the wool at its full length, which often doubles or triples its value. It also removes the wool as a fleece instead of chopping it into small pieces, as shears do.

== The Wolseley Sheep Shearing Machine Company Limited of London ==
The prospectus issued in London on 12 October 1889 stated:

Capital —£200,000 in 40,000 shares of £5 each; 13,332 fully paid deferred shares will be allotted to the vendors leaving 26,668 shares of £5 each which are now offered for subscription.

The vendors (The Wolseley Sheep Shearing Machine Company Limited of Sydney) who are the promoters of this company have fixed the price to be paid for all the patent rights and trade mark obtained and applied for at £75,000 cash and 13,332 fully paid deferred shares of the Company.

Directors

James Alexander, (Redfern, Alexander & Co.) director of the Bank of Australasia

F H Dangar, director of Commercial Banking Co. of Sydney (London board)

John Muirhead, (Latimer Clark Muirhead & Co. Limited)
Abraham Scott, (chairman of Goldsbrough Mort & Co. Limited) (London board)
F Y Wolseley, Managing director

Secretary and offices —Hugh E. Mcleod, Crown Court, Old Broad Street, London

Agents

Victoria NSW and Queensland —Goldsbrough Mort
South Australia —Hon. Henry Scott MLC
New Zealand, Tasmania and S. Africa —Redfern Alexander & Co.
South America – O. G. Oliver-Jones

The company is formed for the purpose of acquiring and working the patent rights in Great Britain . . . and other countries for the Sheep-Shearing Machine and accessories invented and patented by Mr Frederic [sic] York Wolseley

It is estimated that the number of sheep in the countries for which patents have been obtained and applied for amounts to 400,000,000. This forms a magnificent field for operations . . .

== National Museum of Australia ==
There is a Wolseley brand two-stand portable shearing plant in the collection of the National Museum of Australia in Canberra. Manufactured in Birmingham, England, around 1930, the shearing plant is powered by a 32-volt, three horsepower single-cylinder petrol engine, mounted on a wooden trolley base with four cast iron wheels. The plant incorporated a revolutionary mechanised shearing handpiece, one of which is also in the museum's collection. The engine is painted green and inscribed with the brand name Wolseley, and has a metal manufacturer's plate which reads: Wolseley Sheep Shearing Machine Company Ltd Birmingham England. The plant, weighing 550 kg, was used on a sheep property named 'Emoh Ruo' in the Rockley-Black Springs area of New South Wales. It was used by Roy and George Keogh between 1948 and 1976.

== Monument ==
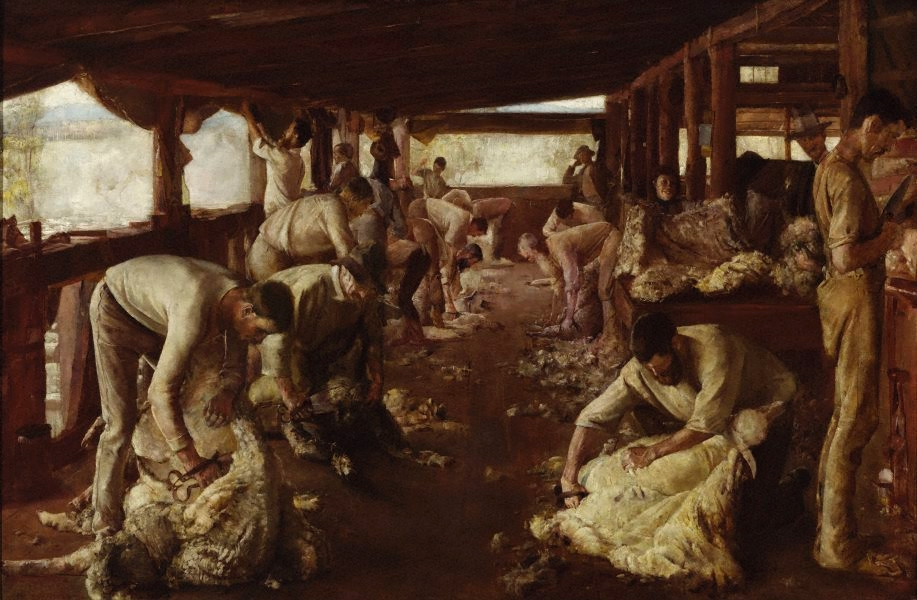
Shearing with shears 1894

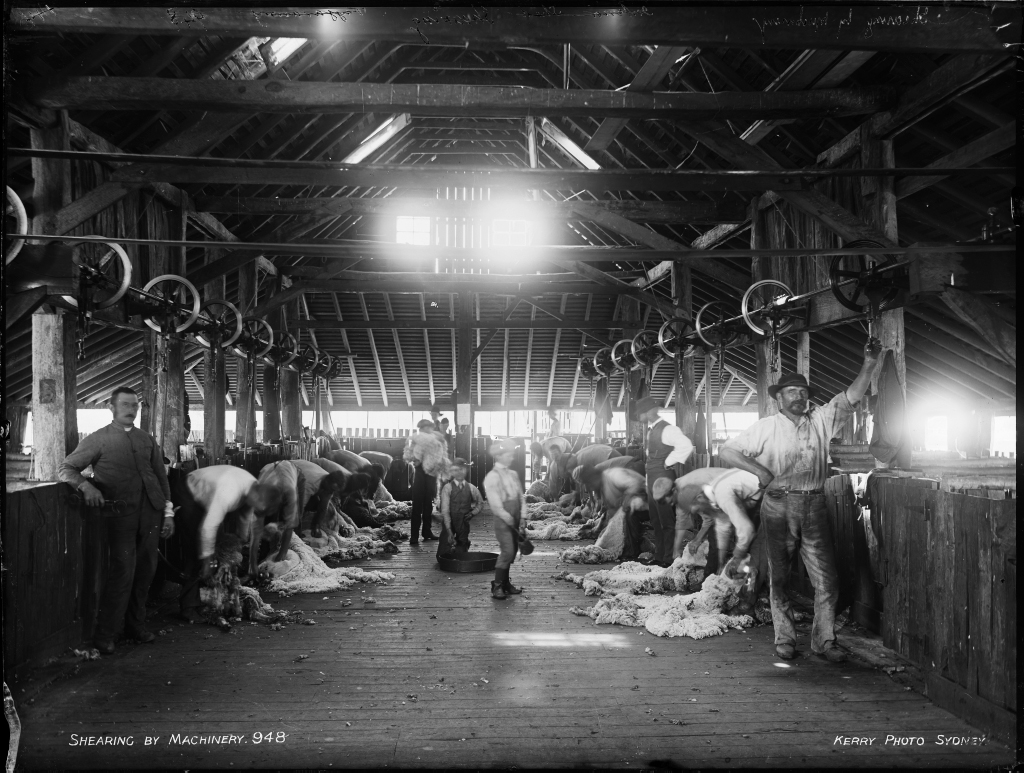
Sixteen stands c.1900

A memorial to Wolseley has been placed on the site of Cobran homestead by Wakool Road near Wakool, New South Wales.

This cairn marks the locality of Cobran homestead, where a 17-year-old Irishman named Frederick York Wolseley gained his five years "colonial experience" under the guidance of John Phillips, a former owner of Warbreccan station, Deniliquin. At this time, 1854, Wolseley's brother-in-law G. Ralston Caldwell held Cobran Station.

Wolseley lived on Cobran and Thule for 22 years. It was here he dreamed of creating a mechanical method of shearing sheep and in time perfected the machine that bore his name. It has become part of the rich history of the wool industry and is now perpetuated in poem and song.

In 1876 Wolseley moved to Arrarownie in the Pilliga scrub then on to Euroka at Walgett. He died in 1899 at Penge in South London, aged 62 years.

In 1894, Herbert Austin of Ascot Vale, Melbourne, at one time employed by Fred Wolseley, went on to produce one of Britain's first cars, and named it Wolseley.

Murray Shire Council
