= Goldsborough =

Goldsborough may refer to:

== Places ==
=== Australia ===
- Goldsborough, Queensland, a locality in the Cairns Region

=== United Kingdom ===
- Goldsborough, Harrogate, North Yorkshire
  - Goldsborough Hall
  - Goldsborough railway station, a closed station
- Goldsborough, Lythe, North Yorkshire

== People with the surname ==
- Ben Goldsborough (born 1990/1991), British politician
- Brice Goldsborough, aviator and father of Frank Goldsborough
- Brice Goldsborough (judge) (1803–1867), justice of the Maryland Court of Appeals
- Charles Goldsborough, Governor of Maryland
- Euphemia Mary Goldsborough Willson (1866–1896), American Civil War nurse
- Frank Goldsborough, aviator and son of Brice Herbert Goldsborough
- James O. Goldsborough, American journalist
- Sir John Goldsborough (died 1693), sea captain
- John Goldesburg or Goldsborough (1568–1618), legal reporter
- John R. Goldsborough (1809–1877), American Civil War United States Navy officer and later commodore
- Louis M. Goldsborough (1805–1877), American Civil War rear admiral
- Phillips Lee Goldsborough, U.S. senator and Maryland governor
- Robert Goldsborough, lawyer and statesman
- Robert Goldsborough (writer), author
- Robert Henry Goldsborough, Federalist
- Thomas Alan Goldsborough, jurist and politician

== Other uses ==
- Battle of Goldsborough Bridge, American Civil War
- Goldsborough (novel), a 1953 novel by Stefan Heym, and the fictional town in the novel
- USS Goldsborough, a list of ships with the name

== See also ==
- Goldsboro (disambiguation)
- Goldsbrough
