= Bodalla, New South Wales =

Bodalla
- Town
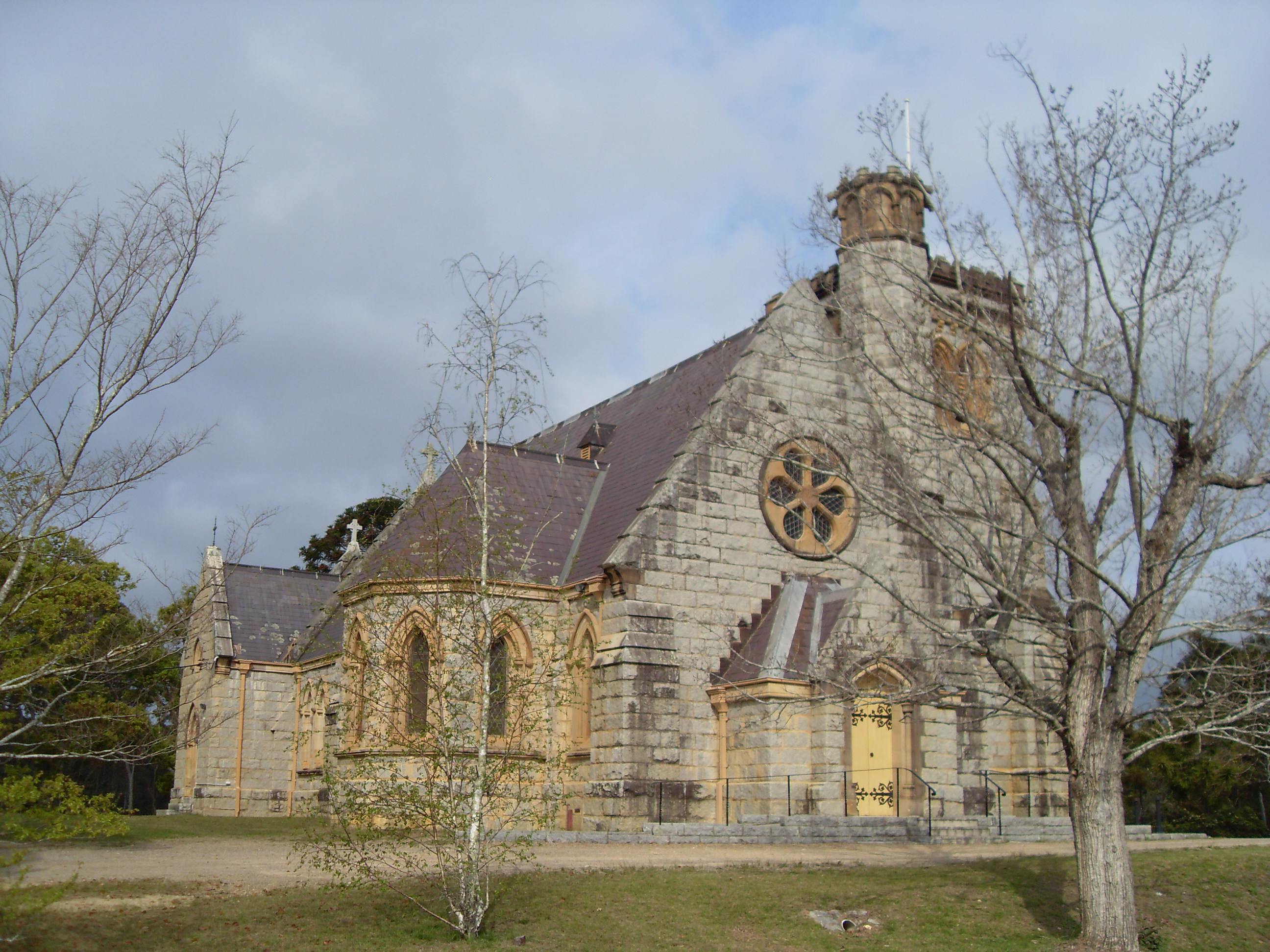
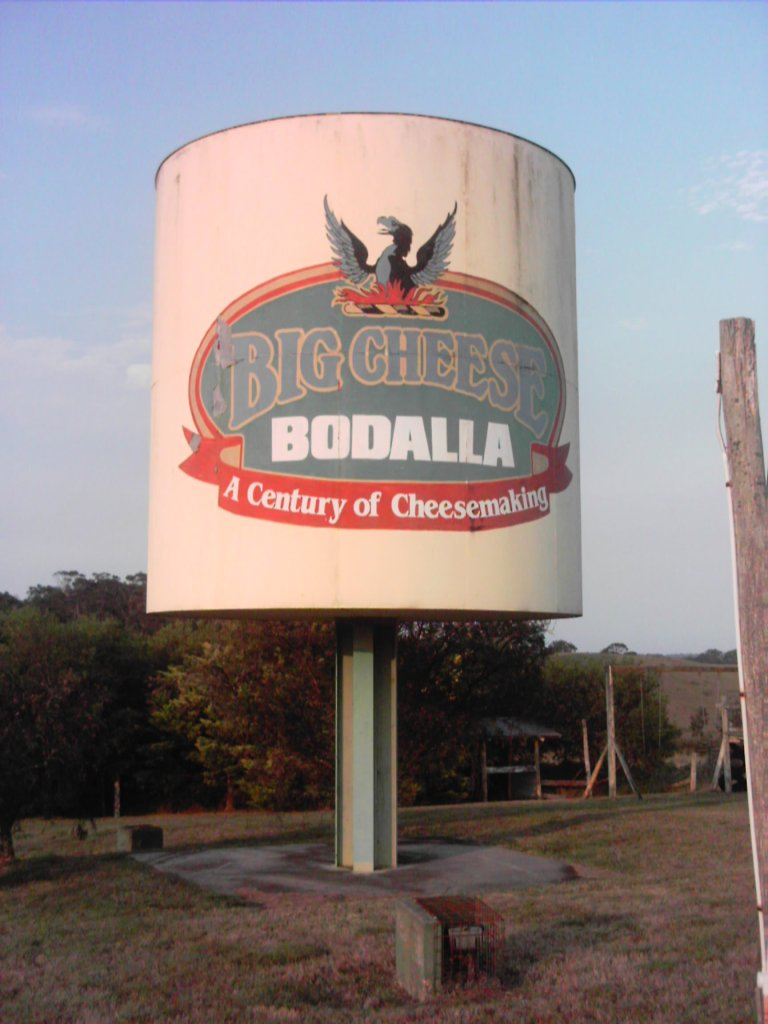
- All Saints Church, Bodalla; commemorating Thomas Mort. The Big Cheese.

- Coordinates: 36°06′S 150°03′E
- Country: Australia
- State: New South Wales
- LGA: Eurobodalla Shire
- Location: 51 km (32 mi) from Batemans Bay

Government
  - State electorate: Bega
  - Federal division: Eden-Monaro

Population
  - Total: 808 (2021 census)
- Postcode: 2545
- County: Dampier

Bodalla is a small town on the South Coast of New South Wales, Australia, and located in the local government area of Eurobodalla Shire. The town sits on the Princes Highway, and is connected by road to Moruya, Narooma, Nerrigundah, Eurobodalla and Potato Point.

The Yuin people are considered to be the traditional owners of the region, and it is from their language that the town and the previous estate and station derived its name. Several meanings have been put forward including Boat Alley", "tossing a child up in the arms", "haven for boats", and "several waters".

== Thomas Sutcliffe Mort ==
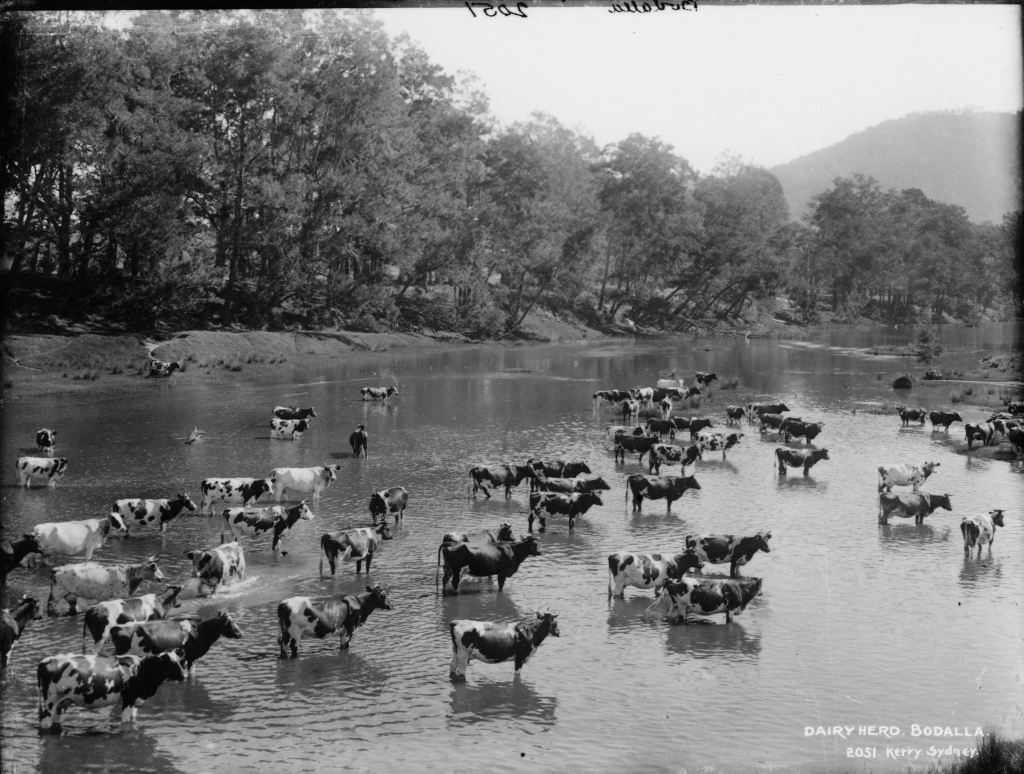
A Dairy herd in Bodalla, circa 1900.

From 1856, Thomas Sutcliffe Mort had been acquiring land in the Moruya district, and eventually owned some 38,000 acres (150 km^{2}), a very substantial holding. In 1860 he purchased Bodalla Station, where he planned to establish a country estate on which to retire, and demonstrate model land usage and rural settlement. He replaced the beef cattle station with an integrated and tenanted dairy estate. He cleared land, drained river swamps, erected fences, laid out farms, sowed imported grasses, and provided milking sheds, cheese, and butter-making equipment. He also provided two bluestone churches, one Anglican and the other Catholic, for his tenants.

By the 1870s, his sharefarming tenants had become disgruntled and left. The estate fell into his sole control, and was run as three farms with hired labour. After he died in 1878, his trustees took over running the farms. In 1887, they set up the Bodalla Company to put the main asset of the estate on a business footing.

Sometime around the end of 1883, the trustees constructed a horse tramway from near the Bodalla Post Office to the North Narooma Wharf at Wagonga Heads to provide great savings in conveying the produce of the estate to market in Sydney. One horse by tramway could easily haul as much as three could by road. The tramway closed between 1889 and 1891 with the reconstruction of local coastal roads.

Another initiative launched by the trustees was the establishment of a commercial outlet in the Strand Arcade in the Sydney CBD to sell the milk, butter, cheese and bacon manufactured on the estate.

Eventually the factory was bought out by the Bodalla Dairy Co-operative, who ran it until it closed in 1987, when it was being supplied by only thirteen farms. These farms transferred their supply to the dairy company at Bega.

Bodalla Cheese is now a brand associated with Fonterra Brands (Australia) Pty Ltd., formerly Bonland Dairies. Fonterra is a New Zealand-owned dairy company.

The Big Cheese Visitors' Centre was once part of the old factory, and is one of Australia's many "big" roadside tourist attractions. It is located on the northern outskirts of the town, and was closed in 2007.

== All Saints Church ==
All Saints Church, commemorating Thomas Sutcliffe Mort and his wife Theresa Shepheard Mort, was designed by Edmund Blacket. The foundation stone was laid by Marianne Mort, Thomas' second wife, on 18 March 1880. It was completed in 1901. The church has one of seven small Henry Willis & Sons organs, built in 1881 and installed the following year. The church cost £13,000 to construct.

== Demographics ==
In the 2021 Census, there were 808 people in Bodalla. Of these 51.1% were male and 48.9% were female. Aboriginal and/or Torres Strait Islander people made up 8.0% of the population. The median age of people in Bodalla was 53 years old. 46.8% of the population were married at the time. Of people aged 15 and over in Bodalla, 11.2% reported having completed Year 12 as their highest level of educational attainment, 21.6% had completed a Certificate III or IV and 9.5% had completed an Advanced Diploma or Diploma. The most common response for religion in Bodalla was 'No Religion' at 31.6%.
