= Goldsboro =

Goldsboro may refer to:

== Places in the United States ==
- Goldsboro, Florida
- Goldsboro, Maryland
- Goldsboro, North Carolina
  - Goldsboro High School
- Goldsboro, Ohio
- Goldsboro, Pennsylvania
- Goldsboro, Texas

== Other uses ==
- Goldsboro (band), a rock music group featuring musician Kevin Roentgen

== People with the surname ==
- Bobby Goldsboro, singer
- William Goldsboro, Canadian marathon runner

== See also ==
- Goldsborough (disambiguation)
- Goldboro
- 1961 Goldsboro B-52 crash
