= Stefan Heym =

German writer (1913–2001)

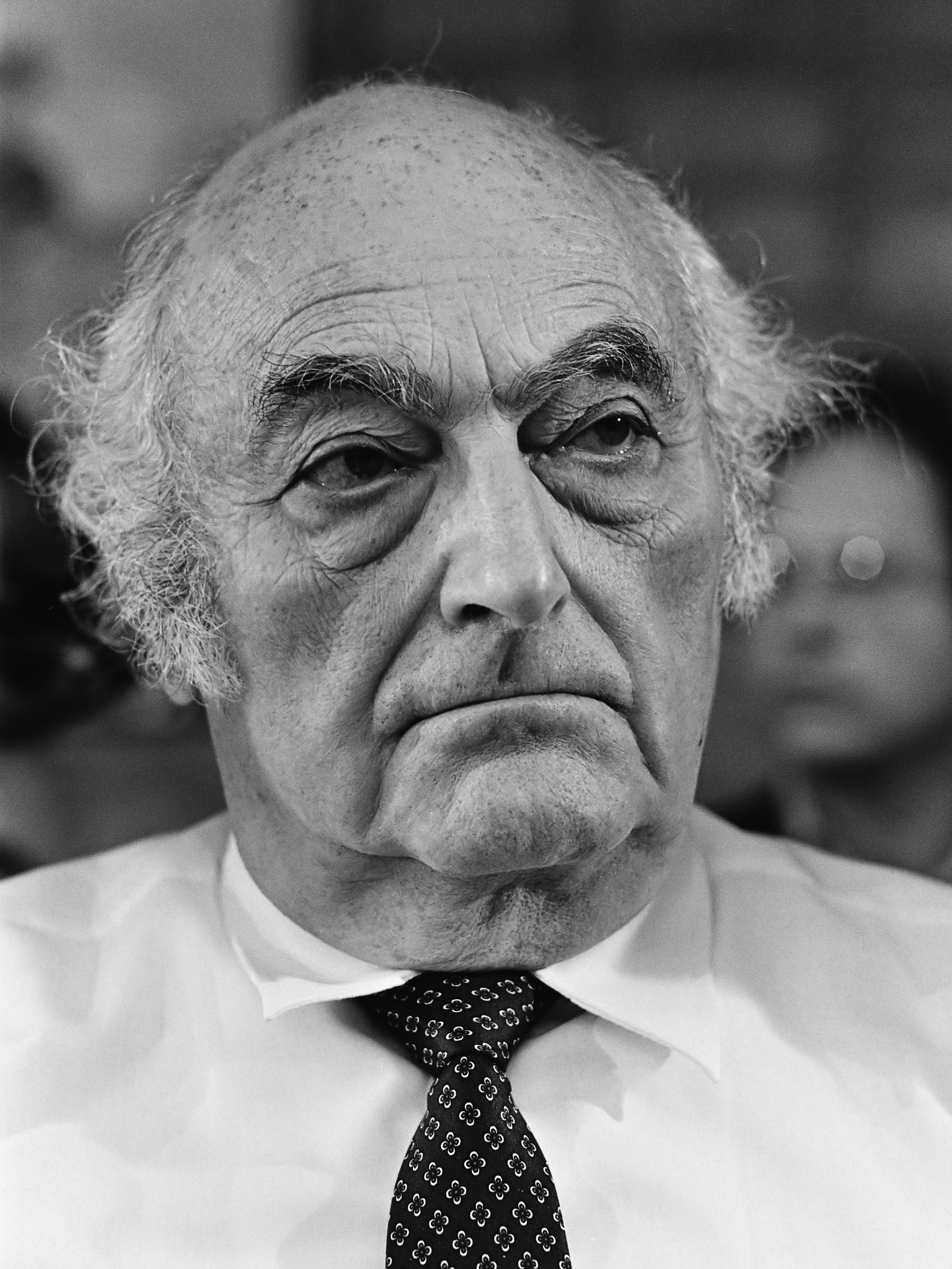
- Heym in 1982
- Born: Helmut Flieg; 10 April 1913; Chemnitz, Kingdom of Saxony, German Empire
- Died: 16 December 2001 (aged 88); Ein Bokek, Tamar Regional Council, Southern District, Israel
- Citizenship: German, American
- Education: University of Chicago
- Occupation: Writer
- Writing career
- Pen name: Stefan Heym, Melchior Douglas, Gregor Holm
- Period: 1938–2003
- Notable awards: Heinrich Mann Prize; 1953; National Prize of East Germany; 1959 2nd Class; Jerusalem Prize; 1993

Helmut Flieg (10 April 1913 – 16 December 2001) was a German writer, known by his pseudonym Stefan Heym (pronounced [ˈʃtɛfan ˈhaɪm]). He lived in the United States and trained at Camp Ritchie in 1943, making him one of the Ritchie Boys of World War II. In 1952, he returned to his home to the part of his native Germany which was, from 1949 to 1990, the German Democratic Republic, or East Germany. He published works in English and German at home and abroad, and despite longstanding criticism of the GDR remained a committed socialist. He was awarded the 1953 Heinrich Mann Prize, the 1959 National Prize of East Germany (2nd class), and the 1993 Jerusalem Prize.

== Biography ==
Stefan Heym

Father of the House
- In office 10 November 1994 – 31 October 1995
- Preceded by: Alfred Dregger
- Succeeded by: Alfred Dregger

Member of the Bundestag for Berlin-Mitte – Prenzlauer Berg
- In office 10 November 1994 – 31 October 1995
- Preceded by: Wolfgang Thierse
- Succeeded by: Hanns-Peter Hartmann

Personal details
- Party: Independent

=== Early years ===
Flieg, born to a Jewish merchant family in Chemnitz, was an antifascist from an early age. In 1931, he was, at the instigation of local Nazis, expelled from the Gymnasium in his home town because of an anti-military poem. He completed school in Berlin, and began a degree in media studies there. After the 1933 Reichstag fire, he fled to Czechoslovakia, where he took the name Stefan Heym.

In Czechoslovakia, the only remaining democracy in Central Europe at that time, he worked for German newspapers published in Prague such as Prager Tagblatt and Bohemia and also managed to have some of his articles published in translation by Czech newspapers. During this time he signed his articles under several pseudonyms, including Melchior Douglas, Gregor Holm and Stefan Heym.

=== United States ===
In 1935, he received a grant from a Jewish student association, and went to the United States to continue his degree at the University of Chicago, which he completed in 1936 with a dissertation on Heinrich Heine. Between 1937 and 1939 he was based in New York as Editor-in-Chief of the German-language weekly Deutsches Volksecho, which was close to the Communist Party of the USA. After the newspaper ceased publication in November 1939, Heym worked as a freelance author in English, and achieved a bestseller with his first novel, Hostages (1942).

From 1943, Heym (who had become a U.S. citizen), contributed to the World War II war effort. He was a member of the Ritchie Boys, a unit for psychological warfare under the command of émigré Hans Habe. His work consisted of composing texts designed to influence Wehrmacht soldiers, to be disseminated by leaflet, radio and loudspeaker. These experiences formed the background for a later novel, The Crusaders, and were the basis for Reden an den Feind (Speeches to the Enemy), a collection of those texts.

After the war Heym led the Ruhrzeitung in Essen, and then became editor in Munich of Die Neue Zeitung, one of the most important newspapers of the American occupying forces. Because of his refusal to soften his critical stance toward Nazism and the German elites that had collaborated with it and his refusal to begin to discreetly weave doubts about Soviet intentions into his editorials, Heym was transferred back to the U.S. toward the end of 1945 and in 1951, fearing investigation by the House Un-American Activities Committee as the hunt for Communists led by Senator Joseph R. McCarthy reached a crescendo, Heym left the United States with his American wife, Gertrude Gelbin, whom he had married in 1944.

In the following years he worked as a freelance author once again. In 1952 he gave all his American military commendations back in protest against the Korean War and moved first to Prague, then in the following year to the German Democratic Republic, after the GDR government had restored his former German citizenship.

=== GDR ===
In the GDR, Heym initially received privileged treatment as a returning antifascist emigre. He lived with his wife in a state-provided villa in Berlin-Grünau. Between 1953 and 1956, he worked at the Berliner Zeitung, thereafter primarily as a freelance author. In the early years of his life in the GDR, Heym supported the regime with socialist novels and other works. Heym's works, which he continued to write in English, were published by a publishing house founded for him (Seven Seas Publishers). In German, translations were printed in large numbers.

Conflicts with the GDR authorities became apparent from 1956 on, as despite the destalinisation of the leadership, the publication of Heym's book on the 17 June 1953, uprising, Five Days in June, was rejected. Tensions increased after 1965, when Erich Honecker attacked Heym during an SED party conference. In 1969, Heym was convicted of breaching the exchange control regulations after publishing his novel Lassalle in West Germany. He was nonetheless able to leave the GDR on foreign trips, such as his two-month visit to the U.S. in 1978, and his books continued to appear, albeit in lower print runs, in the GDR.

In 1976, Heym was among those GDR authors who signed the petition protesting against the exile of Wolf Biermann. From this point on Heym could only publish his works in the West, and he began composing works in German. In 1979, he was again convicted of breaching exchange controls and excluded from the GDR Authors Association. Heym expressed support for German reunification as early as 1982, and during the 1980s supported the civil rights movement in the GDR, contributing a number of speeches to the East Berlin demonstrations in autumn 1989.

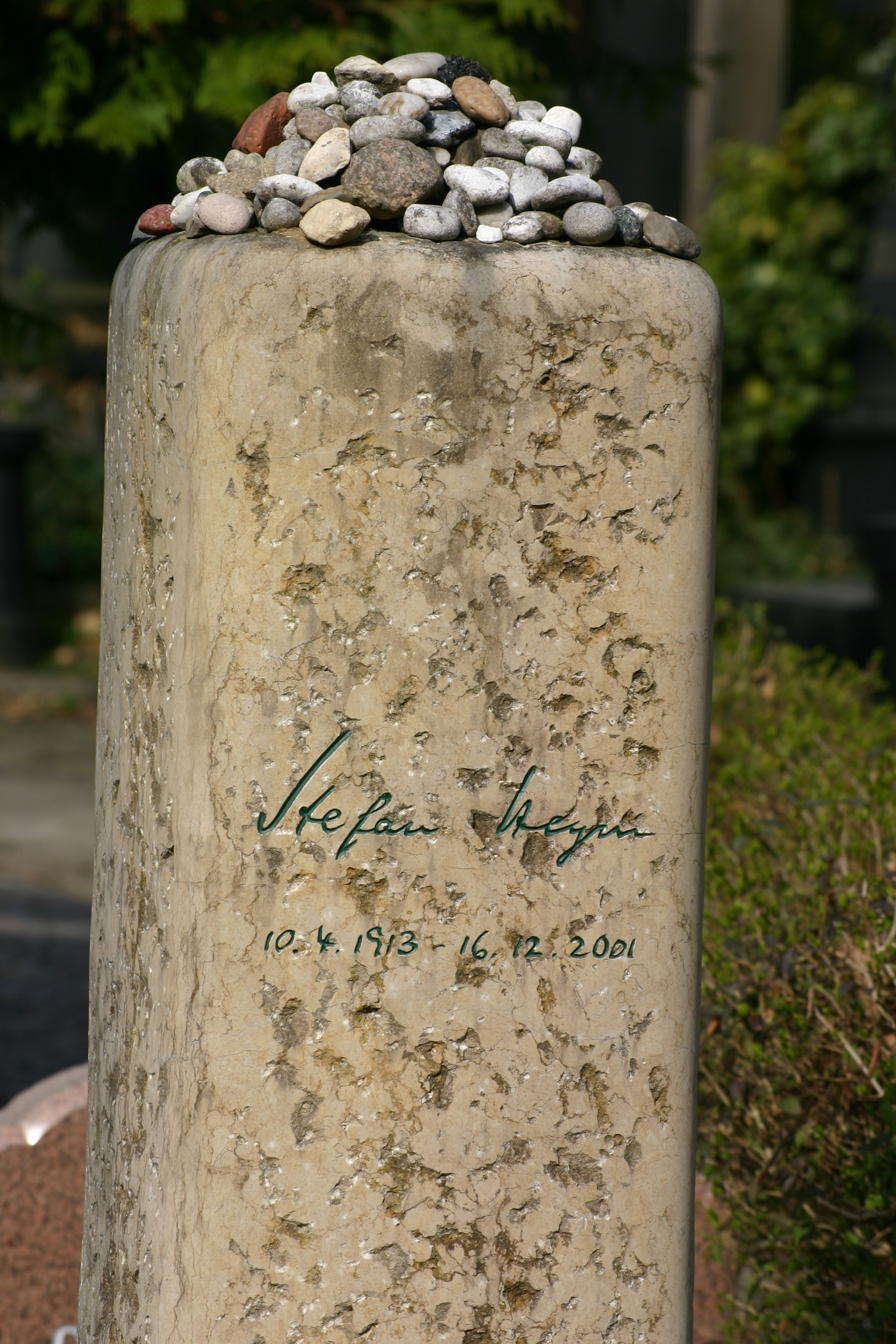
Stefan Heym's grave

=== After reunification ===
In the years after reunification, Heym was critical of what he saw as the discrimination against East Germans in their integration into the Federal Republic, and argued for a socialist alternative to the capitalism of the reunited Germany. At the 1994 German federal election, Heym stood as an independent on the Open List of the then Party of Democratic Socialism (PDS), but won direct election to the Bundestag by winning the seat of Berlin-Mitte/Prenzlauer Berg (discontinued after 1998, Berlin-Friedrichshain-Kreuzberg – Prenzlauer Berg East being one successor).

As President by right of age of the Bundestag he held the opening speech of the new Parliament in November 1994, but resigned in October 1995 in protest against a planned constitutional amendment raising MP expense allowances. In 1997, he was among the signers of the "Erfurt Declaration", demanding a red-green alliance (between SPD and Greens) to form a minority government supported by the PDS to end the 16 year reign of Chancellor Kohl after the 1998 German federal election (which saw a decisive SPD win with a stable red-green majority).

Heym died suddenly of heart failure in Ein Bokek in Israel whilst attending a Heinrich Heine Conference. He was honoured with honorary doctorates from the University of Bern (1990) and University of Cambridge (1991), and honorary citizenship of Chemnitz, his birthplace (2001). He was also awarded the Jerusalem Prize (1993) for literature 'for the freedom of the individual in society', and the peace medal of the IPPNW. Previously he had won the Heinrich-Mann-Prize (1953), and the National Prize of the GDR, 2nd class (1959). He died in 2001, aged 88, and was buried in the Weißensee Cemetery.

== Works ==
=== Written in English ===
- Nazis in the U.S.A., New York 1938
- Hostages, New York 1942
- Of Smiling Peace, Boston 1944
- The Crusaders, Boston 1948
- The Eyes of Reason, Boston 1951
- Goldsborough, Leipzig 1953
- The Cannibals and Other Stories, Berlin 1958
- A visit to Soviet science, New York 1959; OCLC 644208573
- The Cosmic Age, New Delhi 1959
- Shadows and Lights, London 1963
- The Lenz Papers, London 1964 – concerns the failed revolutions in Germany in 1848, specifically the 1849 Baden Revolution.
- The Architects written c 1963 – 1965, unpublished (published in German as Die Architekten, Munich 2000; published in English under "The Architects" by Northwestern in 2005; ISBN 0-8101-2044-5)
- Uncertain Friend, London 1969
- The King David Report, New York 1973 - giving many anecdotes of King David's life which did not get into the Bible (see Ethan (biblical figure)#In Literature).
- The Queen against Defoe, London 1975
- Five Days in June, London 1977 (concerning the 1953 uprisings in the GDR)
- Collin, London 1980

=== Written in German ===
- Collin (1979)
- Der kleine König, der ein Kind kriegen mußte und andere neue Märchen für kluge Kinder (1979)
- Ahasver (1981) – published in English as The Wandering Jew (1984)
- Atta Troll. Versuch einer Analyse (1983 )
- Schwarzenberg (1984) – novel about the Free Republic of Schwarzenberg
- Reden an den Feind (1986)
- Nachruf (1988) – autobiography
- Meine Cousine, die Hexe und weitere Märchen für kluge Kinder (1989)
- Auf Sand gebaut (1990) – short stories
- Stalin verlässt den Raum (1990) – political writings
- Einmischung (1990)
- Filz (1992)
- Radek (1995) - published in English in 2022
- Der Winter unsers Missvergnügens (1996)
- Immer sind die Weiber weg und andere Weisheiten (1997)
- Pargfrider (1998)
- Immer sind die Männer schuld (2002)
- Offene Worte in eigener Sache (2003)
