= Potato Point, New South Wales =

Potato Point
- Town
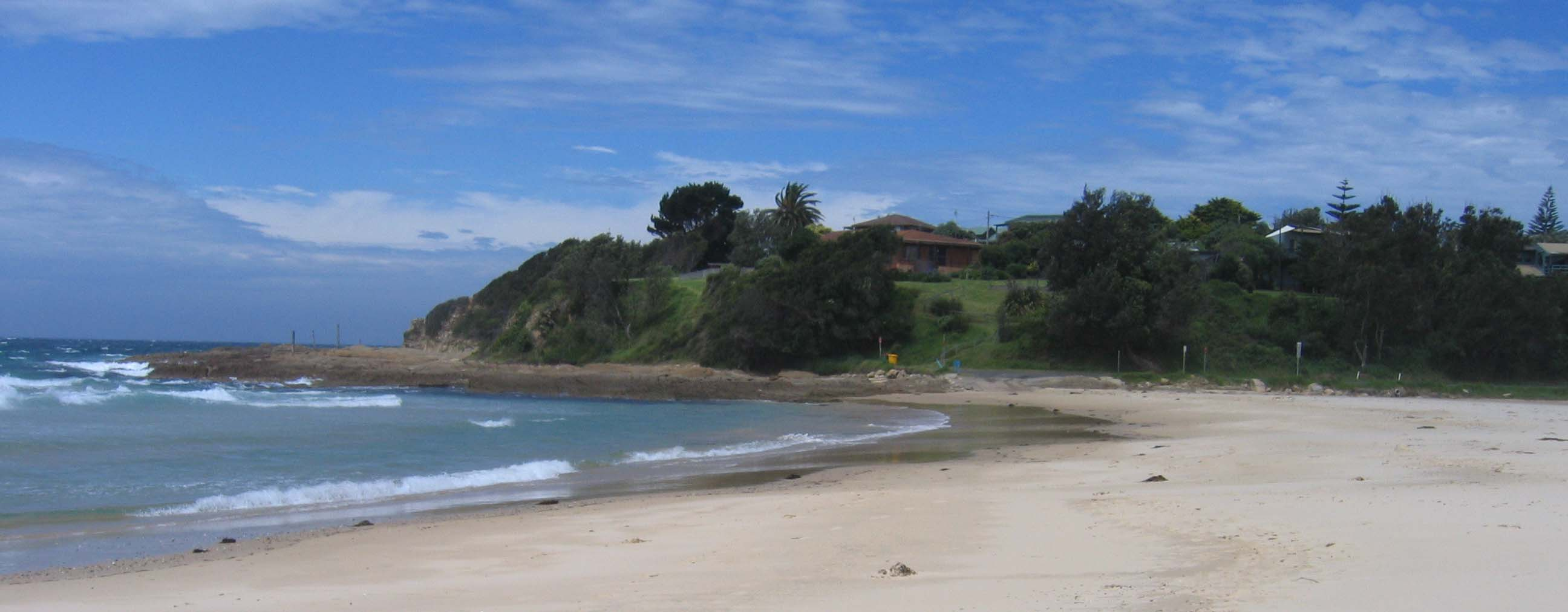
- Potato Point NSW from Potato Beach (20 Dec 2007)

- Coordinates: 36°06′S 150°08′E
- Country: Australia
- State: New South Wales
- LGA: Eurobodalla Shire
- Established: 1963

Government
  - State electorate: Bega
  - Federal division: Eden-Monaro

Population
  - Total: 135 (2016 census)
- Postcode: 2545

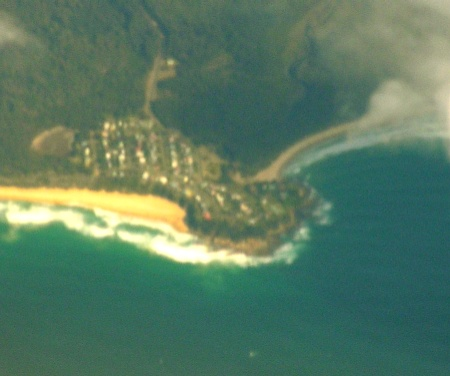
Aerial photo from east

Potato Point is a village in the Eurobodalla Shire lying on the south coast of New South Wales, Australia. It is connected by road to the town of Bodalla, and surrounded by the Eurobodalla National Park. The Yuin are considered to be the traditional owners of the region. At the 2016 census, Potato Point had a population of 135 and 56 occupied and 78 unoccupied dwellings. The only non-residential facilities are the local rural fire brigade depot which houses two appliances, toilet and shower block, boat ramp, two small parks and a telephone box.

Remains of a wharf jut into the sea over the rocks of the Point, which include wooden piers, thick iron staples and various carvings into the softer rock. Further around to the south are the rusting remains of an old boiler and other machinery.

The beaches on either side of the Point are Potato Beach (north) and Jemison's Beach (south). The latter is open to rough seas and wild winds, whereas the former is more sheltered and known locally for good surfing breaks and fine beach fishing, especially of salmon and bream. Cod, eels and luderick are taken from the rocks of the Point. Notable diving locations are found offshore from the Point, which can be accessed from the local north-facing boat ramp.

To the north lies the Beachcomber Holiday Park and Lake Brunderee. This small tidal lake is connected intermittently to the ocean by Potato Creek, and is a major habitat for swans and chestnut teal, as well as an important drought refuge. In 1999 the lake was declared a habitat protection zone due to its importance as a fish spawning ground. To the south lies a small shallow, and often dry unnamed coastal lake which abounds in bird-life at various times of the year. Horse trails snake through the hinterland. Local fauna includes eastern grey kangaroos, red-necked wallabies, bandicoots, emus, echidnas, eastern rosellas, crimson rosellas and sea eagles.
