= Queensland Primary Producers No 4 Woolstore =

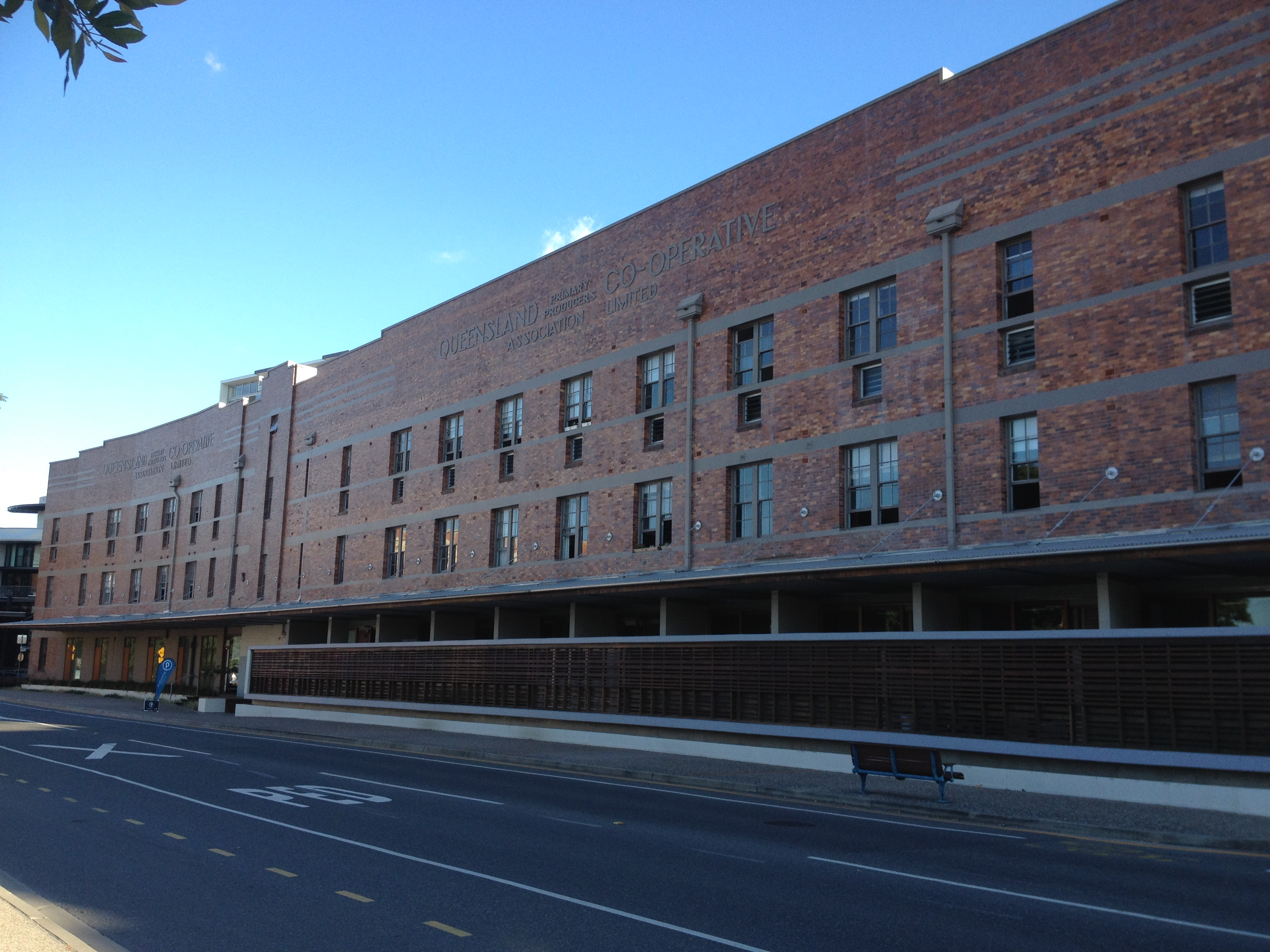
- Queensland Primary Producers No 4 Woolstore, 2014

- Location within Queensland Location within Australia
- 27.4524°S 153.0478°E
- Location: 16 Skyring Terrace, Teneriffe, City of Brisbane, Queensland, Australia

History
- Design period: 1919–1930s (interwar period)
- Built: 1930s–1940s

Site notes
- Architectural style: Art Deco

Queensland Heritage Register
- Official name: Queensland Primary Producers No 4 Woolstore (Commercial House)
- Type: state heritage (built)
- Designated: 21 October 1992
- Reference no.: 600325
- Significant period: 1930s–1940s (fabric); 1930s–1976 (historical use)

Queensland Primary Producers No 4 Woolstore is a heritage-listed warehouse at 16 Skyring Terrace, Teneriffe, City of Brisbane, Queensland, Australia. It was built from 1930s to 1940s. It is also known as Commercial House. It was added to the Queensland Heritage Register on 21 October 1992.

== History ==
The land was advertised on 18 June 1845 in the New South Wales Government Gazette at what was later known as "Bulimba Road East Side" and what is now the suburb of Teneriffe, Brisbane. The auction was held on 19 September 1845 and Daniel Budd Skyring bought 24 acres on the Brisbane River what was then listed in government records situated in the county of Stanley parish of North Brisbane Allotment number 14 of the Eastern Suburb Allotments. Later before the original title was granted the allotment number changed to 59 and title volume 9549 Folio 117 being granted on the 27 December 1845. This land, known as "Skyring’s Paddock" was probably used for outgoing and incoming goods to and from Sydney. Also it was probably used for farming and to run cattle although there is no record of this.

Following Skyring's death, the site was subdivided amongst his sons in 1882; hence the name when the Skyring Road Act resumed some of the land in 1884. In about 1907 Frederic Emile Sturmfels started his own woolbroking and stock and station agency at Oxley and Sturmfels Ltd began acquiring land at Teneriffe. By 1910 the company had erected a woolstore on the corner of Skyring Terrace and Helen Street.

More land was acquired in 1927 and the firm changed its name in 1932 to Sturmfels Primary Producers Co-operative Association Ltd. Stage 1 of the existing woolstore was built on the corner of Skyring Terrace and Commercial Road by 1937. Stage 3 replaced the original Sturmfels woolstore and was built after Sturmfels Primary Producers Co-operative Agency Ltd amalgamated with Queensland Primary Producers Co-operative Association Ltd in 1941.

On the opposite side of Helen Street was one of the most distinctive of the associated woolstores, Primary Producers No 1. Primaries No 2, 5, 6 and 7 were in Commercial Road and Helen Street. In 1976 the No 4 woolstore was transferred to Oxlade Investments. Renamed Commercial House, it was acquired to store cars "at grass" and became the head office for the Mayfairs group of companies which owns five other woolstores (Australian Estates No. 1 Store, Australian Estates No. 2 Store, Elder Smith Woolstore, Goldsbrough Mort Woolstore, Winchcombe Carson Woolstores). All of these properties are zoned in the Brisbane City Council's Teneriffe Development Plan (1986) for a mixture of residential, commercial, light industrial, service and tourist recreation purposes.

== Description ==
Queensland Primary Producers Cooperative Association No 4 Woolstore, formerly Sturmfels Primary Co-operative Association Ltd, is a three-storey brick and timber warehouse which was mostly built during the 1930s. Though developed in three stages, the first and last stage being along the curved frontage, the design is quite cohesive. This was achieved by working around the initial structure which was then pulled down and the interior rebuilt. Constructed largely of variegated reddish toned bricks in a restrained Art Deco style, it implements the common tripartite division of base, shaft and entablature in its functional form.

One third of the way along from Commercial Road is a slightly projecting mock tower with a small stepped pediment, which in addition to the long window openings and box downpipes, provides a degree of verticality. Nevertheless, the overwhelming emphasis is horizontal, mainly due to a series of strikingly rendered bands - wide ones delineating each floor above a row of windows, narrow ones beneath each row, and three narrow bands separating the inscribed company name across the broad stepped parapet. The upper levels are distinguished from the ground floor base line by darker bricks, but more so by the straight awning which shelters the railway siding and loading bays with their steel protective plates and inground tracks. Whereas stages 1 and 2 use Queensland hardwood for joists and beams, stage 3 employs Oregon. The former external double-brick wall delimits stages 1 and 3 on the ground and first floors, while the top showroom floor is one vast expanse with a forest of tubular metal poles. The showroom also has square vents with timber louvers beneath the windows, and the customary sawtooth roof aligned from east to west for optimum lighting. This floor never contained a dining room, as the Primaries No 1 store provided this facility for clients next door. Nevertheless, it was equipped with the usual array of bale elevators and wool chutes.

The original office area was on the second floor of stage 1. Today much of the ground and first floors have been converted into modern offices by Mayfairs. They use the main entrance near the Commercial Road end. However, a grand foyer, exposing the Oregon posts of stage 3, with a modern timber staircase and commissioned paintings of pastoral scenes, has been created in the centre of the building.

== Heritage listing ==
Queensland Primary Producers No 4 Woolstore (Commercial House) was listed on the Queensland Heritage Register on 21 October 1992 having satisfied the following criteria.

The place is important in demonstrating the evolution or pattern of Queensland's history.

The Queensland Primary Producers No 4 woolstore is most significant in its own right and for its heritage contribution to the Teneriffe precinct. It reflects important developments, technological features and marketing procedures in Queensland's wool industry since the late 1930s as well as the history of commerce along the Brisbane River and of the pastoral companies concerned.

The place is important in demonstrating the principal characteristics of a particular class of cultural places.

In form and fabric, this structure is an excellent example of the broad class of brick and timber woolstores which were built in Australian ports, to serve the wool industry. In keeping with other woolstores of similar vintage (e.g. Goldsbrough Mort Woolstore), this illustrates particularly well the 1930s stage of development in an industrial process and associated building form which is now redundant; it is also the site of one of the earliest Teneriffe woolstores, and one of two stores formerly owned by the only remaining Queensland pastoral house.

The place is important because of its aesthetic significance.

This structure also has considerable visual impact due to its substantial form and Interwar Art Deco style, which is unique amongst Teneriffe woolstores.

The place has a strong or special association with a particular community or cultural group for social, cultural or spiritual reasons.

That this store, with its significant pastoral and business connections, is a valued asset and a local landmark, has been recognised by its inclusion in the Teneriffe Development Plan.
