= Thomas Sutcliffe Mort =

Australian industrialist (1816 – 1878)

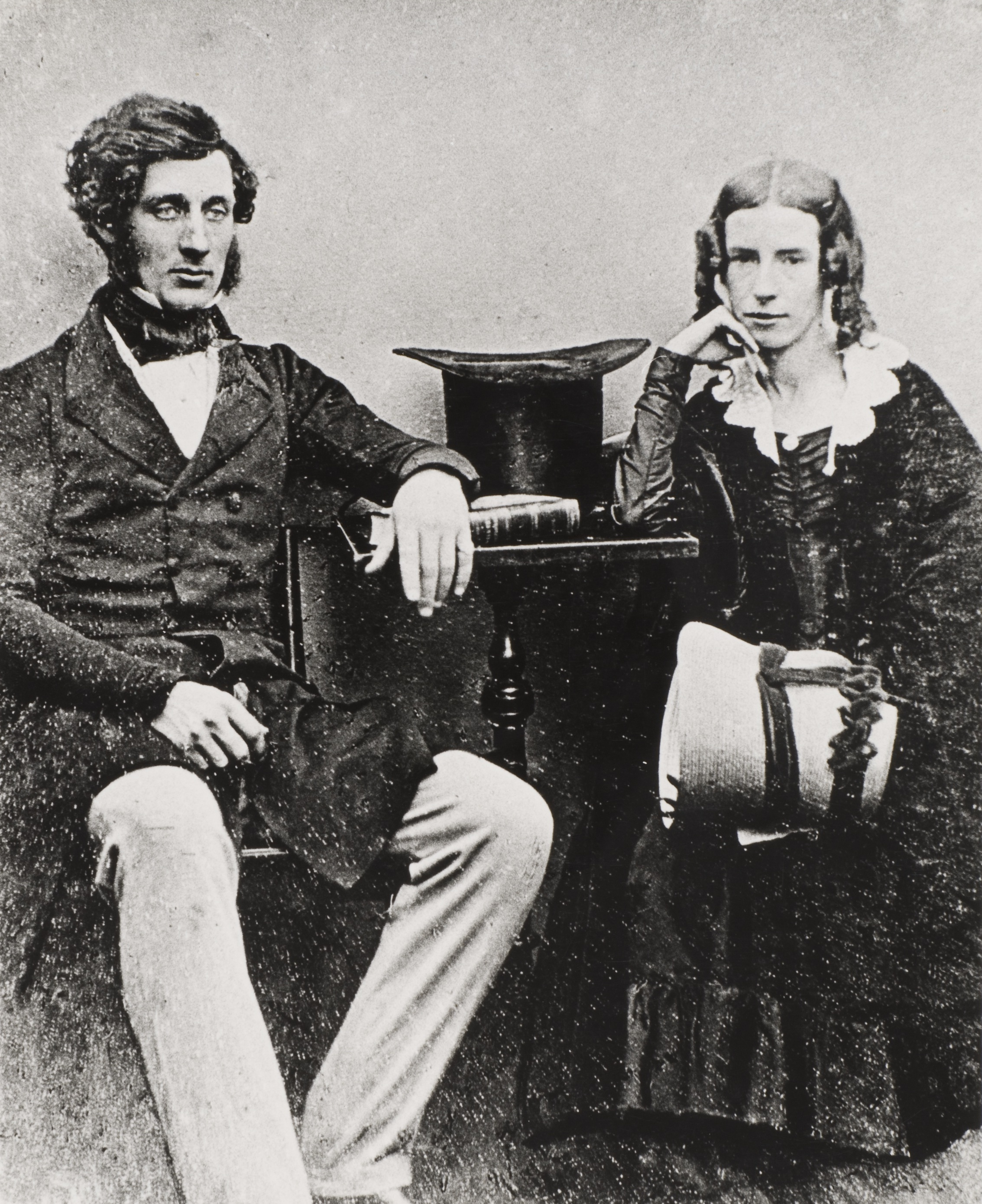
- Thomas Sutcliffe Mort and his first wife, Theresa, photographed c. 1847
- Born: 23 December 1816; Bolton, Lancashire, England
- Died: 9 May 1878 (aged 61); Bodalla, New South Wales, Australia
- Occupations: Industrialist; grazier; philanthropist
- Organization(s): Goldsbrough Mort & Co.; later to become Elders Limited
- Known for: Improving refrigeration of meat
- Spouses: Theresa Mort; Marianne Mort

Thomas Sutcliffe Mort (23 December 1816 – 9 May 1878) was an Australian industrialist who improved the refrigeration of meat. He was renowned for speculation in the local pastoral industry as well as industrial activities such as his ice-works in Sydney's Darling Harbour and dry dock and engineering works at Balmain.

== Businessman ==
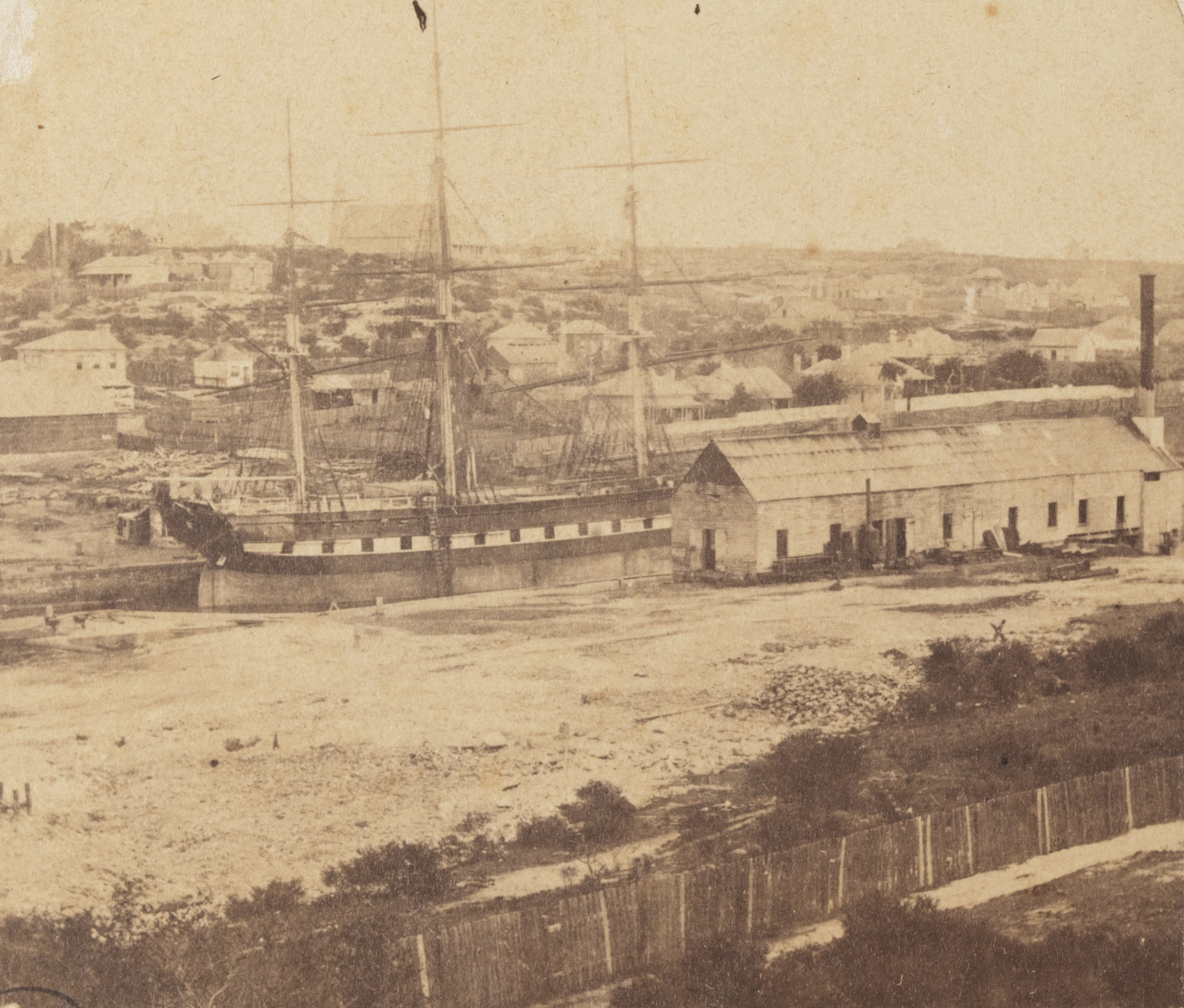
Mort's Dock at Waterview Bay, Balmain, c. 1860, by William Hetzer

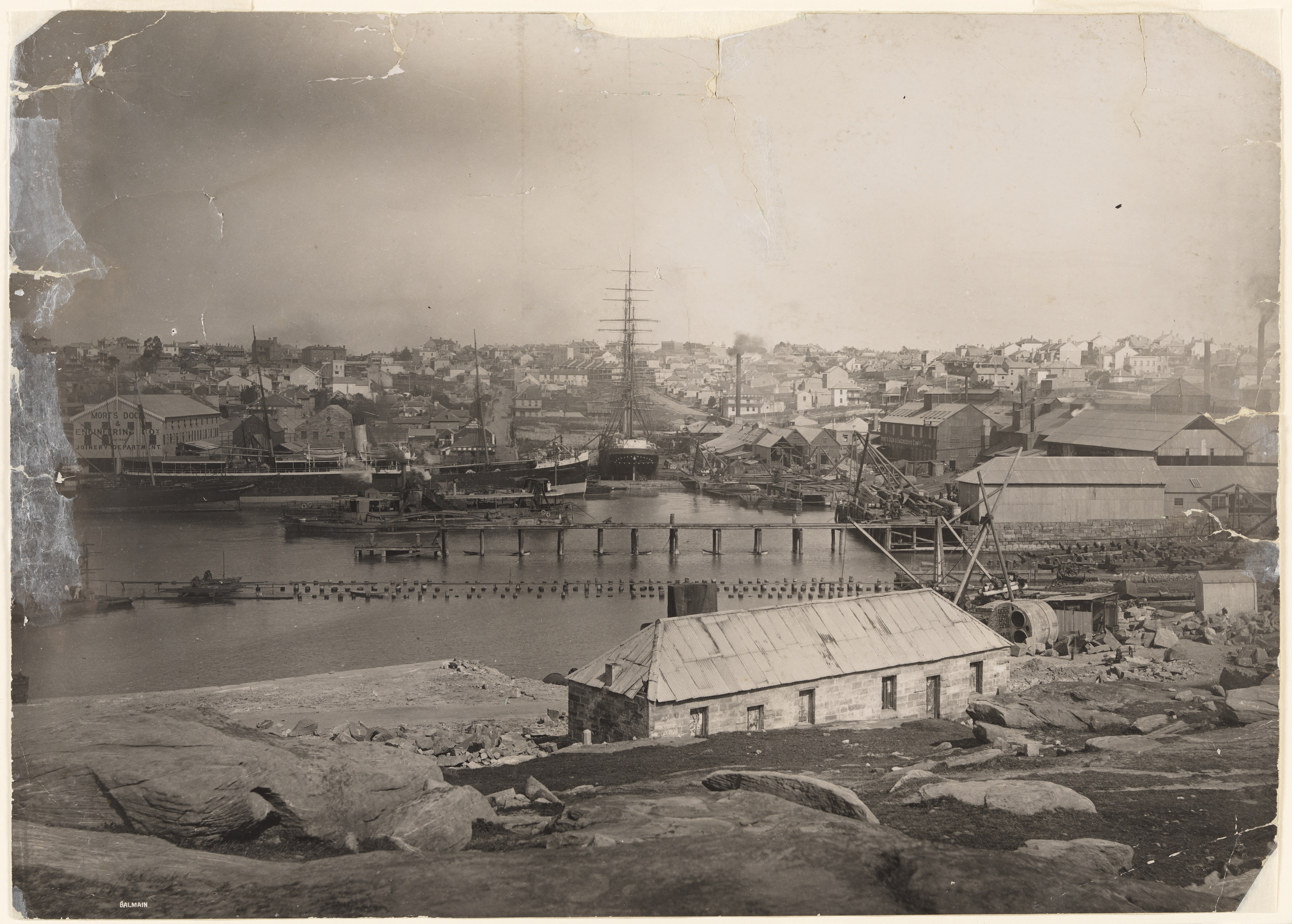
Mort's Dock at Waterview Bay, Balmain, 1887

Mort was born in Bolton, Lancashire, England in 1816. In 1878, he was associated with the Australian Mutual Provident Society. In 1849, he was one of a committee, which funded a company to promote sugar growing at Moreton Bay. In 1850 Mort was a member of the Sydney Exchange Co, and in 1851 he was a director of the Sydney Railway Co. and was also involved in mining (gold, later also copper and coal) and other enterprises. In the 1850s, he opened Mort's Dock in Sydney, a business that was not as successful as he wished. In 1843, he established Mort & Company, in Sydney, and held the first wool auction there, which was the beginning of the wool auction system.

Mort returned to England for a visit in 1857–59. During that visit he bought many furnishings, pictures and other goods, in particular at a sale of the possessions of the Earl of Shrewsbury. He commissioned the architect Edmund Blacket to build a house to add to his house to display the new possessions. His gallery was open to the public.

From 1856, Mort began acquiring land near Moruya on the south coast of New South Wales. In 1860, Mort acquired the Bodalla estate near the mouth of the Tuross River. Mort eventually owned 15,000 hectares (38,000 acres) in the district, a very substantial holding in that fertile area. Bodalla is alleged to have been originally known as 'Boat Alley'. Mort's vision for Bodalla was as a country estate to retire on and to demonstrate model land utilisation and rural settlement. Mort wished to have a tenanted dairy estate run as an integrated whole.

Mort replaced the beef cattle that had been farmed there and carried out extensive improvements including clearing land, draining river swamps, erecting fences, laying out farms, sowing imported grasses, and providing milking sheds, cheese and butter-making equipment. Butter and cheese were produced for the Sydney market. By the 1870s, the tenants were disgruntled sharefarmers and the estate was in Mort's control again run as three farms with hired labour.

In 1866, Mort expanded his dry dock into an engineering works. Mort offered shares to his employees and in 1875, the company was incorporated with limited liability having been managed beforehand by a committee that included four leading hands. This was one of the earliest attempts at co-operation between capital and labour in Australia, and although the effort at sharing ownership was only partially successful, Mort always had good relations with his employees.

Also in the mid-1860s, Mort had been looking at refrigeration as a way of developing manufacturing orders, to ensure better access to the Sydney market for the butter and cheese he was producing at Bodalla and to offset the vulnerability of being exposed to falling wool prices. Mort financed experiments by Eugene Dominic Nicolle, a French born engineer who had arrived in Sydney in 1853 and registered his first ice-making patent in 1861.

In 1861 Mort established at Darling Harbour the first freezing works in the world, which afterwards became the New South Wales Fresh Food and Ice Company. The first trial shipment of frozen meat to London was in 1868. Although their machinery was never used in the frozen meat trade, Mort and Nicolle developed commercially viable systems for domestic trade, although the financial return on that investment was not a great success for Mort.

As a part of his refrigeration works, Mort developed a large abattoir at Lithgow where sheep and cattle from western New South Wales were slaughtered and refrigerated for later transport.

Mort was a director of the Western Kerosene Oil Company, when in July 1871, he bought the assets of the rival Hartley Kerosene Oil and Paraffine Company, at auction. His purchase facilitated the merger of the two companies existing operations, at Hartley Vale and Waterloo, to form the New South Wales Shale and Oil Company, in 1872. That company, which mined and processed oil shale at Hartley Vale, and later also at Torbane, continued in business until it was taken over by Commonwealth Oil Corporation in 1906.

Mort was a prominent Anglican layman. He donated the land for St Mark's Church, Darling Point, and commissioned Edmund Blacket to design the church. Mort contributed to the upkeep of the church and also to the building of St. Andrew's Cathedral, Sydney and St Paul's College, University of Sydney. He was also the founder of Christ Church School in Pitt Street, Sydney.

== Death and legacy ==
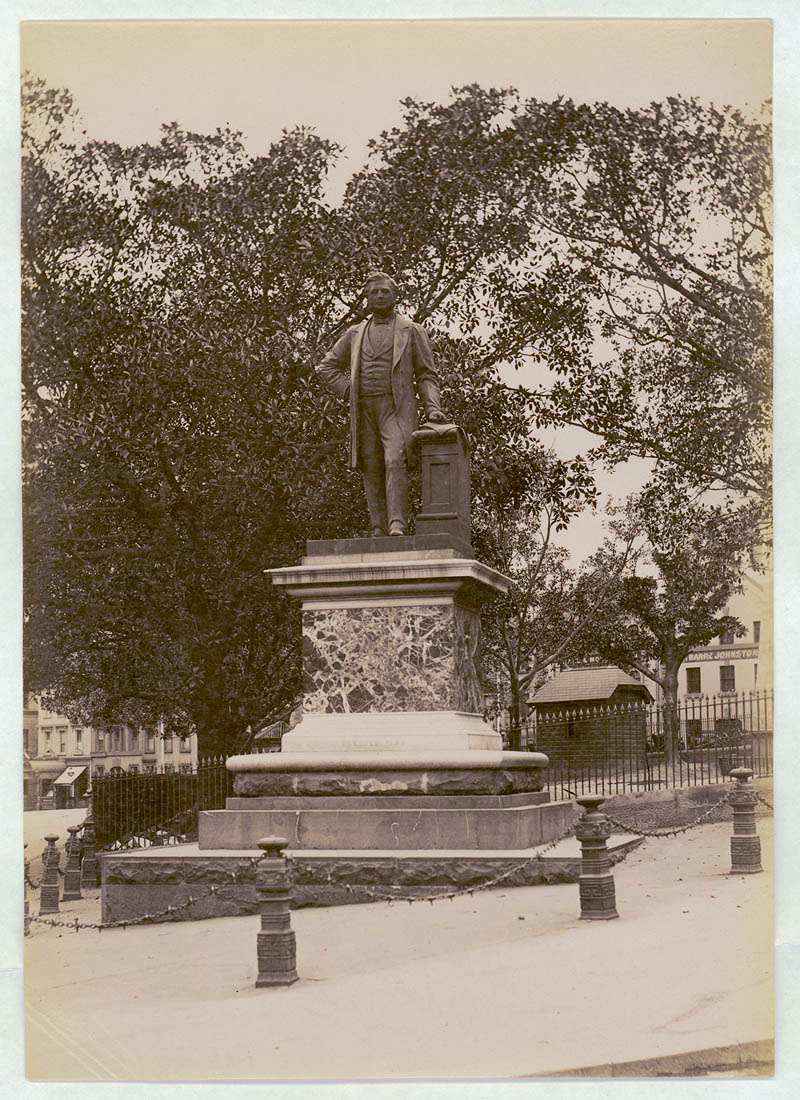
T. S. Mort's Statue, Macquarie Place, Sydney photographed about 1900–1910

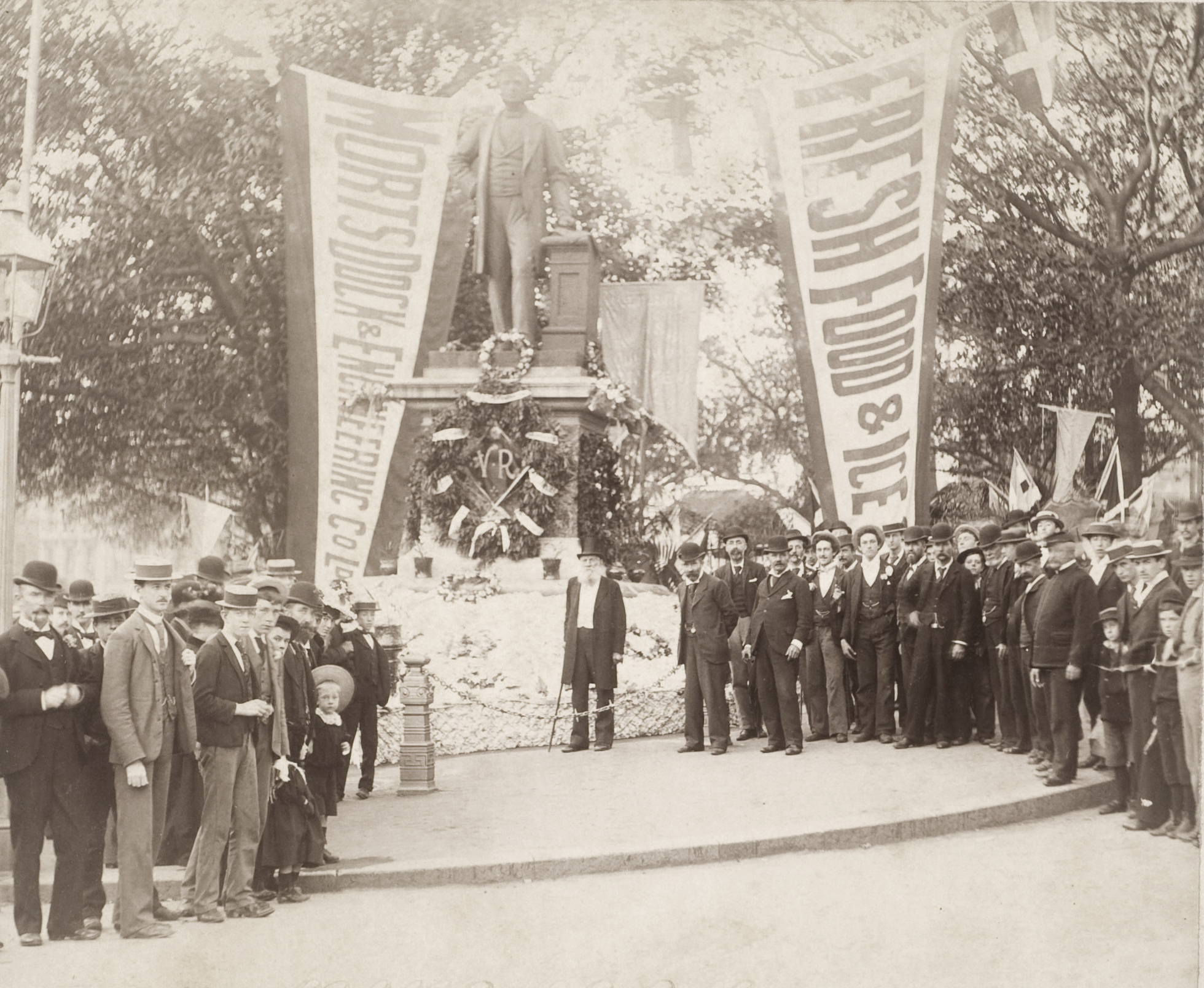
Unveiling of the statue of TS Mort, Macquarie Place, Sydney, 9 June, 1883

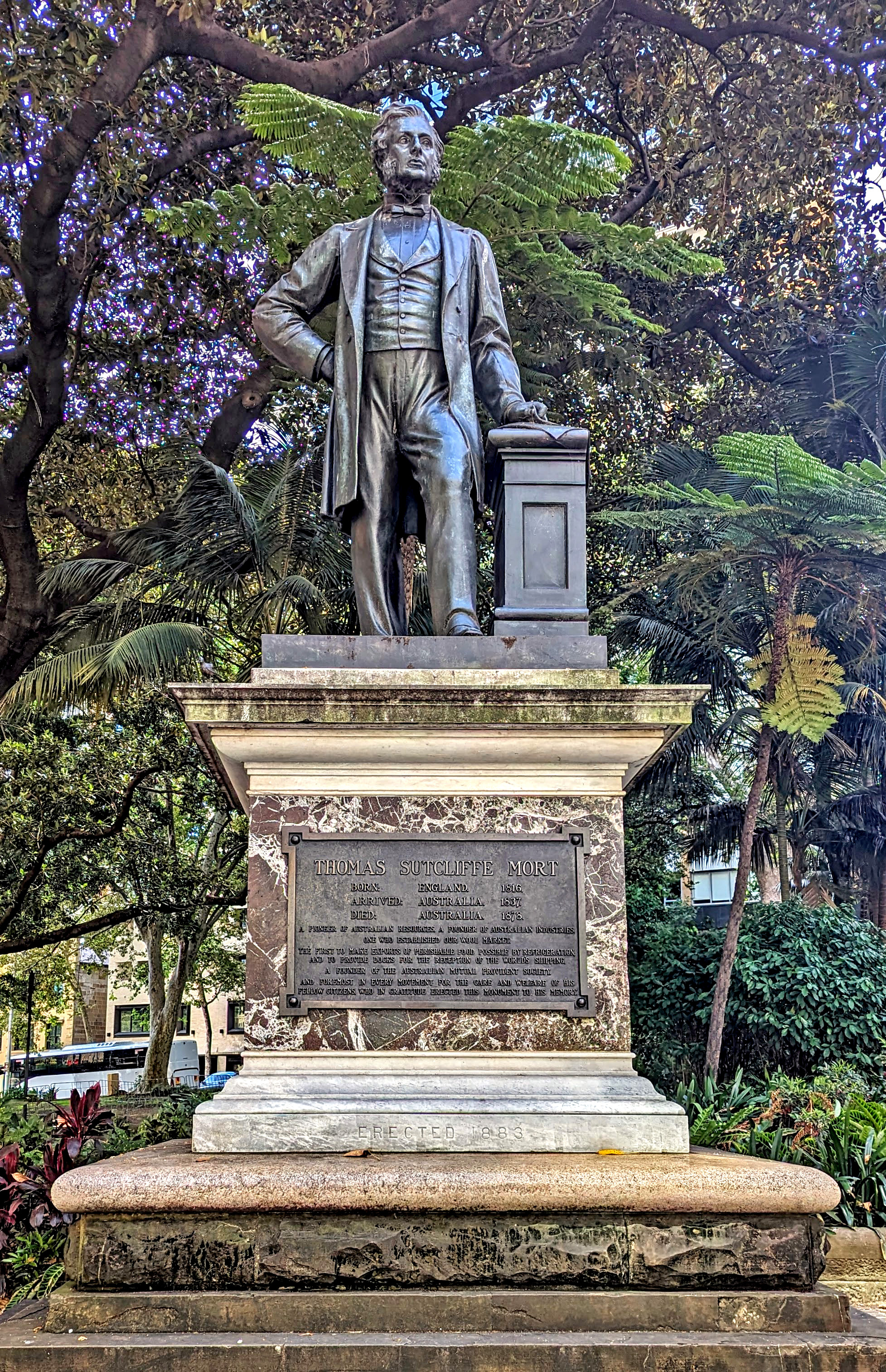
The statue in 2024

Mort died of pneumonia at Bodalla on 9 May 1878.

Mort, using the technology developed by another new Australian, French immigrant Eugene Nicolle (who dissolved ammonia in water to reach a temperature of -20 °C in a sealed room) in Balmain built the first freezerworks. Subsequently, with the help of NSW politician, Augustus Morris, they overcame the public's mistrust of frozen food by revealing to an audience of the influential (after their state meal) that the food was not "fresh". This was consequently reported in the Sydney Morning Herald and helped to trigger demand for frozen meats and other primary produce, first to the rural population thence to Britain and, eventually, the world.

From Thomas Mort's peroration at the inaugural lunch on 2 September 1875, at which 300 persons attended including Sir John Hay, the Hon. J. Docker, Sir Saul Samuel, the Hon. (afterwards Sir) John Robertson, and Mr (afterwards Sir) Henry Parkes:

I feel, as I have always felt, that there is no work on the world’s carpet greater than this in which I have been engaged. Yes, gentlemen, I now say that the time has arrived — at all events, is not far distant — when the various portions of the Earth will each give forth their products for the use of each and of all; that the over-abundance of one country will make up for the deficiency of another; the superabundance of the year of plenty serving for the scant harvest of its successor; for cold arrests all change. Science has drawn aside the veil, and the plan stands revealed. Faraday’s magic hand gave the keynote, and invention has done the rest. Climate, seasons, plenty, scarcity, distance, will all shake hands, and out of the commingling will come enough for all, for ‘the Earth is the Lord’s and the fullness thereof’ and it certainly lies within the compass of man to ensure that all His people shall be partakers of that fullness. God provides enough and to spare for every creature He sends into the world; but the conditions are often not in accord. Where the food is, the people are not; and where the people are, the food is not. It is, however, as I have just stated, within the power of man to adjust these things, and I hope you will all join with me in believing that the first grand step towards the accomplishment of this great deed is in that of which you yourselves have this day been partakers and witnesses.

At the time of his death he was spoken of as "the greatest benefactor the working classes in this country ever had". Within a week, a meeting of working men in Sydney had resolved to show their esteem; a sculpture in Macquarie Place by Pierce Connolly was unveiled in 1883.

Mort is also commemorated by All Saints Church, Bodalla, built in his honour by his family, to a design by Blacket, using granite quarried on Mort's property. The foundation stone was laid in 1880. It was completed in 1901. The church has one of seven small Henry Willis & Sons organs. The church cost A£13,000.

Mort's business Mort & Co. became Mort & Co. Ltd in 1883. It merged with R Goldsbrough & Co Ltd in 1888 to form Goldsbrough Mort & Co. Ltd. In 1963 a merger formed Elder Smith Goldsbrough Mort Ltd which traded until 1982. The present day business is Elders Limited.

His house in Darling Point which he called Greenoaks became the home of the Anglican Archbishop of Sydney on 24 October 1910 and was renamed Bishopscourt. It was listed on the New South Wales State Heritage Register in 1999.

The southern Sydney suburb of Mortdale and its main road, Morts Road, are named after him.

== See also ==
- James Harrison
- Richard Goldsbrough
