= Goldsborough (novel) =

Novel by Stefan Heym

- First edition
- Author: Stefan Heym
- Language: English
- Genre: Proletarian literature
- Publisher: Paul List
- Publication date: 1953
- Publication place: German Democratic Republic
- Media type: Print (Paperback)
- Pages: 511
- OCLC: 220887147

Goldsborough is a proletarian novel by the German-American writer Stefan Heym.

== Description ==
Goldsborough depicts a coal miners' strike during 1949-1950 set in the fictional Goldsborough, Pennsylvania, a company town near Pittsburgh. The protagonist is Carlisle Kennedy, head of a large family and himself a miner. When the local union chief fails to take action against the company, Kennedy leads a wildcat pit strike.

Stefan Heym, a refuge from Hitler's Germany and a naturalized American, began this novel in the United States after doing site visits with coal miners in Western Pennsylvania, but McCarthyism drove him to East Germany, where he finished writing it in 1952. The book was written and first published in English, in Leipzig, and released by an American publisher a year later, as well as in a German translation.

Heym renounced his American citizenship in response to the beginning of the Korean War and lived in East Germany until his death. A book critical of American capitalism and praising striking miners was completely acceptable to the authorities of the German Democratic Republic; only later did the authorities become displeased with Heym, when he started expressing opinions critical of the East German regime itself.
