= James O. Goldsborough =

American journalist and author (born 1936)

James Oliver Goldsborough (1936-2023) was an American journalist and author, born in New York City of a family with roots in Pittsburgh. Brought up in Los Angeles, he graduated from UCLA with a degree in economics. After serving two years in the U.S. Army he attended UC Berkeley Law School and Mexico City College.

His journalism career spanned 40 years, a half-dozen publications and two continents. The last 13 years were spent in San Diego, first with the Evening Tribune and then with the Union-Tribune, where he specialized in editorials and columns about foreign policy.

He died at his home in San Diego on May 22, 2023.

== Career ==
He worked for the San Francisco Examiner, Honolulu Advertiser, Arizona Republic, New York Herald Tribune, International Herald Tribune, Toronto Star, Newsweek, San Jose Mercury News, and San Diego Union-Tribune, winning numerous awards along the way. He was the Edward R. Murrow fellow at the Council on Foreign Relations in 1973-'74 and senior associate at the Carnegie Endowment for International Peace in 1979-'83, where he published Rebel Europe: Living with a Changing Continent, called by Los Angeles Times reviewer Charles Champlin "the most important book I have read in years."

He was author of numerous articles on foreign affairs for Foreign Affairs, Foreign Policy, the New York Times Sunday Magazine, Fortune, and the Reader's Digest. He was written monographs for the Chicago Council on Foreign Relations, the Stimson Center and Politique Etrangère. His history of negotiations among the New York Times, Washington Post and Whitney Communications to form the International Herald Tribune was published in the July/August 1974 edition of the Columbia Journalism Review. In 2008, his family memoir, Misfortunes of Wealth, about the great fortunes made by the steel families of Pittsburgh, was published by The Local History Company. The Paris Herald, a fictional account of the creation of the International Herald Tribune in 1967, was published in 2014, followed by Waiting for Uncle John in 2018, an historical novel about the first U.S. invasion of Cuba, the so-called Lopez intervention of 1851.

Goldsborough became editorial page editor of the San Diego Tribune in 1991, and from 1992 to 2004 was foreign affairs columnist for the San Diego Union Tribune, resigning from the newspaper in December 2004 over the publisher's killing of a column explaining why Jewish voters overwhelmingly cast their presidential ballots for John Kerry. The article was subsequently published in the New York The Jewish Daily Forward under the headline "Too Hot for San Diego."

== Books ==
- Rebel Europe: Living with a Changing Continent (Macmillan, 1983)
- Misfortunes of Wealth (The Local History Company, 2008)
- The Paris Herald (fiction) (Prospecta Press, April 2014)
- Waiting for Uncle John (fiction) (Prospecta Press, February 2018)
