= Goldsbrough Mort & Co. =

- Industry: Agriculture
- Predecessors: R Goldsbrough & Co; Mort & Co.
- Founded: 1888; 138 years ago
- Founders: Thomas Sutcliffe Mort; Richard Goldsbrough
- Defunct: 1962
- Fate: Merged with Elder Smith & Co
- Successor: Elder Smith Goldsbrough Mort & Co. Ltd (now Elders Limited)

Goldsbrough Mort & Co. was an Australian agricultural business.

== History ==
In 1843 Thomas Sutcliffe Mort established a business which operated as auctioneers and brokers in the wool trade. The business took on partners and become known as Mort & Co.

In 1847, Richard Goldsbrough founded a wool broking business in Melbourne.

In 1888, R. Goldsbrough & Co. merged with Mort & Co. to form Goldsbrough Mort & Co.

In 1962 Goldsbrough, Mort & Co. merged with Elder Smith & Co. to form Elder Smith Goldsbrough Mort & Co. Ltd.

In 1981 Elder Smith Goldsbrough Mort & Co. Ltd merged with Henry Jones IXL to form Elders IXL which today trades as Elders Limited.

== Notable buildings ==
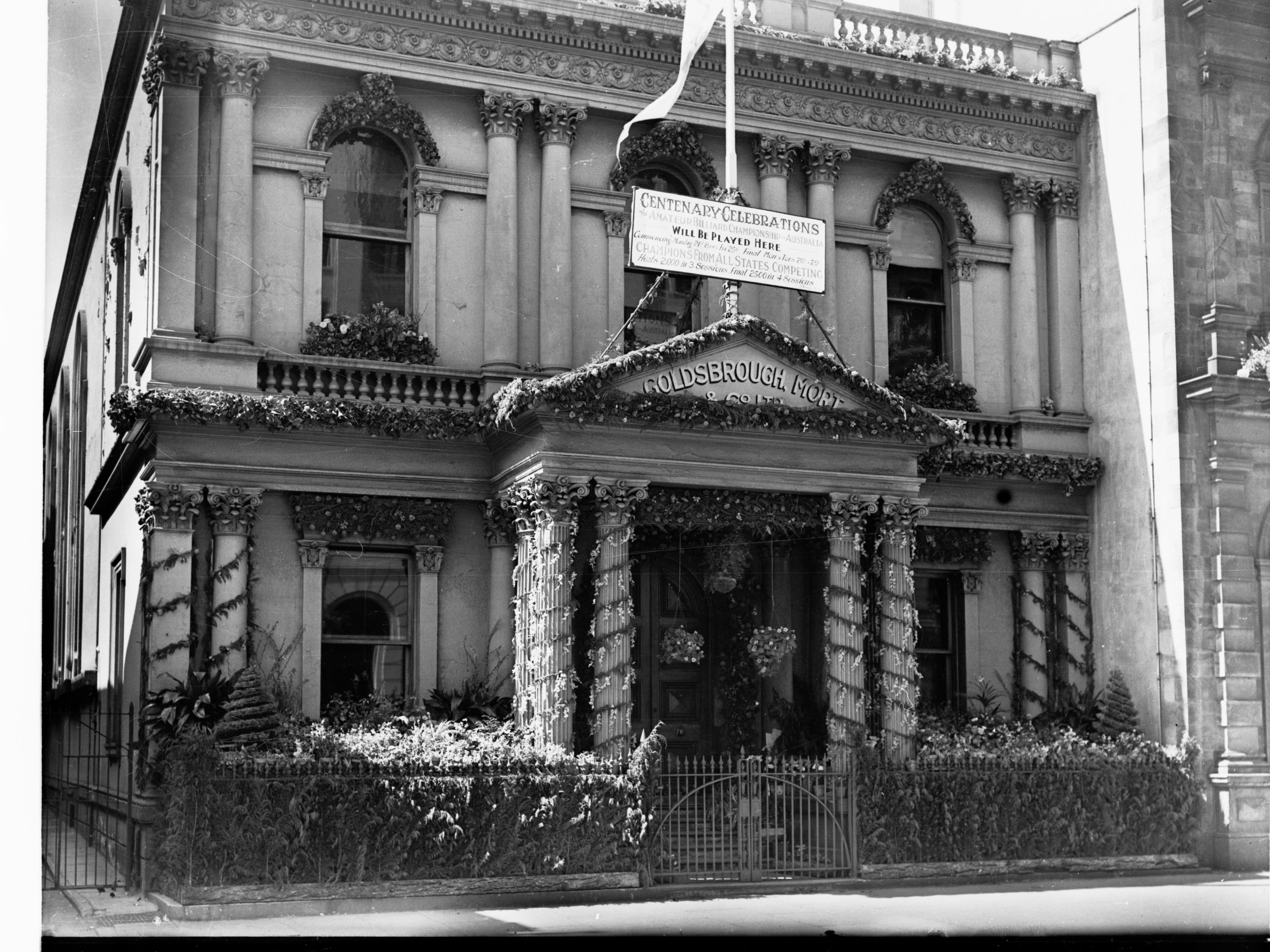
Goldsbrough Mort Building in King William Street, Adelaide, decorated for State centenary, 1936

Prominent South Australian architect F. Kenneth Milne designed a woolstore for Goldsborough Mort at Port Adelaide.

Some of Goldsbrough Mort's buildings are now heritage-listed, including:

- Goldsbrough Mort Woolstore, Brisbane
- Goldsbrough Mort Building, Rockhampton

== Legacy ==
Goldsbrough Street in Fremantle, Western Australia, is named after the company because they owned property there. It runs between Elder Place (named after Elders Ltd.) and Cantonment Street.
