= Goldsbrough Mort Building, Rockhampton =

Goldsbrough Mort Building
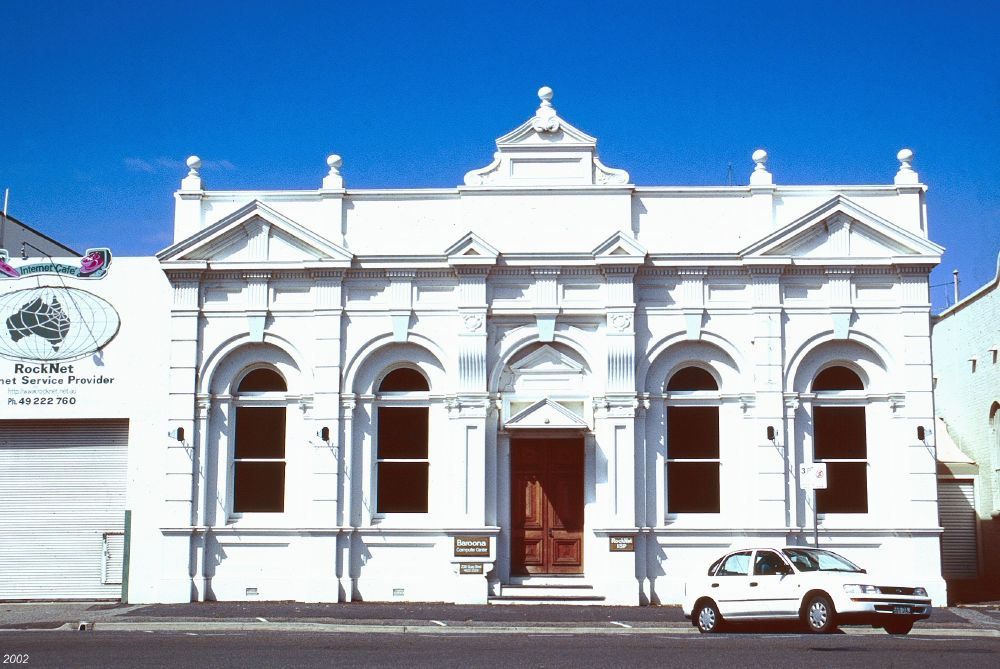
- Former Goldsbrough Mort Building, 2002

- Location within Queensland Location within Australia
- 23.3802°S 150.5158°E
- Location: 238 Quay Street, Rockhampton, Rockhampton Region, Queensland, Australia

History
- Design period: 1870s–1890s (late 19th century)
- Built: 1899

Site notes
- Architectural style: Classicism

Queensland Heritage Register
- Official name: Goldsbrough Mort Building (Former), Quay Street, Rockhampton, Drug Houses of Australia Ltd, Queensland Druggists Building, Taylors Elliots & Australian Drug Ltd
- Type: state heritage (built)
- Designated: 30 January 2004
- Reference no.: 601489
- Significant period: 1890s (fabric); 1899–1932 (historical use by Goldsbrough Mort); 1980s–1990s (use by radio broadcast)

Goldsbrough Mort Building is a heritage-listed warehouse at 238 Quay Street, Rockhampton, Rockhampton Region, Queensland, Australia. It was built in 1899. It is also known as Drug Houses of Australia Ltd, Queensland Druggists Building, and Taylors Elliots & Australian Drug Ltd. It was added to the Queensland Heritage Register on 30 January 2004.

== History ==
During the 1890s, Rockhampton's business community underwent many changes, including the toppling of many local stock and station agencies and wool and produce brokers. At the same time was witnessed the arrival of branches of large southern firms such as Dalgetys which opened a branch office in 1891, and then Goldsbrough, Mort & Co. Ltd in 1896.

The prosperous southern based pastoral house of Goldsbrough, Mort & Co. Ltd was established in Melbourne c. 1888, with branch offices thereafter opened at Sydney and London. The Goldsbrough Mort Building situated at 514–526 Bourke Street (corner William St.) Melbourne, "is all that survives of a complex of distinctive stone woolstores and offices located in this area which comprised the Goldsbrough empire and were the nucleus of one of the world's greatest wool broking firms".

The expansion of Goldsbrough Mort activities into Queensland took place with the establishment of a branch office in Rockhampton c. 1896. This branch office was initially located in East Street, Rockhampton, managed by Mr J.M. Niall. This was followed later by branch activities in Brisbane in the early 1910s, for which the Goldsbrough Mort Woolstore at Teneriffe stands testament.

In 1899, Walter and Eliza Hall had the extant building at 238 Quay Street, a late Victorian, classical-style single storey cement render and brick building, constructed. It was into these Quay Street premises that Goldsbrough Mort moved its office and store from East Street, to this more suitable commercial centre of Rockhampton conveniently placed opposite the important port and wharf facilities. An advertisement for Goldsbrough, Mort & Co., Ltd in 1900 directed commercial cliental attention to the firm as "The Oldest and Largest Wool Sellers in Australia." The firm's Quay Street branch office at this time was managed by Acting Manager Mr J. Fairweather.

Eliza Rowden Kirk (1847–1916) was the daughter of George Kirk, who had pastoral interests with Goldsbrough Mort founder, Richard Goldsbrough. In 1875, Eliza married Walter Russell Hall (1831–1911), a successful businessman and philanthropist. Hall made his business fortune through interests in Cobb & Co in Victoria and Queensland, and later in Queensland with the Mount Morgan Gold Mining Co. Ltd. As a philanthropist, Walter gave generously, often anonymously, to various public institutions and charities. After his death in 1911, Eliza set up a trust to commemorate her husband's memory, which was to become known as the Walter and Eliza Hall Trust. This Trust continued to be used for the relief of poverty and the advancement of education and research, including the establishment of the Walter and Eliza Hall Institute of Research in Pathology and Medicine in Melbourne in 1916.

The building situated at 238 Quay Street, though tenanted by Goldsbrough Mort, was owned by Walter and Eliza Hall, or their Trustees, till November 1917 when the building was purchased by Goldsbrough Mort. This location was to remain the branch wool and produce brokerage office and store for Goldsbrough Mort activities until 1932. In these final years at this location this branch office was managed by Mr J. Rankin.

In January 1932 the building at 238 Quay Street was purchased by Taylors Elliots & Australian Drug Ltd. who maintained interests at this location until December 1955, when ownership transferred to firstly DHA (Qld) Pty Ltd (till July 1964), and then Drug Houses of Australia Ltd from August 1964. This latter firm utilised these premises until September 1974, when it was taken over by Slater Walker Finance Corp Ltd, to be followed by various ownership.

In the 1980s and 1990s, the former Goldsbrough Mort Building at Quay Street was leased and utilised by Radio 4RK and the Australian Broadcasting Corporation.

In 2015, the building is occupied by a construction consulting company.

== Description ==
The former Goldsbrough Mort Building is a single storey rendered masonry building addressing Quay Street, Rockhampton.

The main facade, facing north-west towards the Fitzroy River, has a central entry and two arch-headed windows to either side. The facade is articulated with pilasters and triangular pediments and has a parapet with ball finials above.

The rear elevation, facing the laneway, has a double gabled parapet.

The interior of the building has been modified to accommodate subsequent tenants.

The front section of the building (the former office area) appears quite intact, and retains large amounts of original fabric, including joinery, fenestration and other detailing, and much of the original room layout. The original ceiling may survive above the later suspended ceiling.

The rear area of the building has been substantially altered with a new suspended ceiling and mezzanine level supported by new timber columns.

== Heritage listing ==
The former Goldsbrough Mort Building was listed on the Queensland Heritage Register on 30 January 2004 having satisfied the following criteria.

The place is important in demonstrating the evolution or pattern of Queensland's history.

The Goldsbrough Mort Building built in 1899 is important in demonstrating the evolution of Queensland's history, in this case the expansion of commercial enterprise and activity in the important regional centre of Rockhampton. This commercial activity is similarly representative of the role of the Port of Rockhampton throughout this process. In this respect this building is also important in understanding the business expansion of the major southern wool and produce brokers, and stock and station agents firm of Goldsbrough, Mort & Co. Ltd. in the 1890s.

The place is important because of its aesthetic significance.

This former Goldsbrough Mort Building also exhibits particular aesthetic characteristics valued by the Rockhampton and broader community. This is especially so as it complements, in conjunction with many other similarly valued buildings, the streetscape of Rockhampton's historic Quay Street.

The place has a special association with the life or work of a particular person, group or organisation of importance in Queensland's history.

As an early surviving office building of the pastoral company Goldsbrough Mort the place has a special association with Goldsbrough Mort, an important organization in Queensland's economic history and the pastoral expansion in central Queensland at the turn of the twentieth century.
