= Goldsbrough Mort Woolstore =

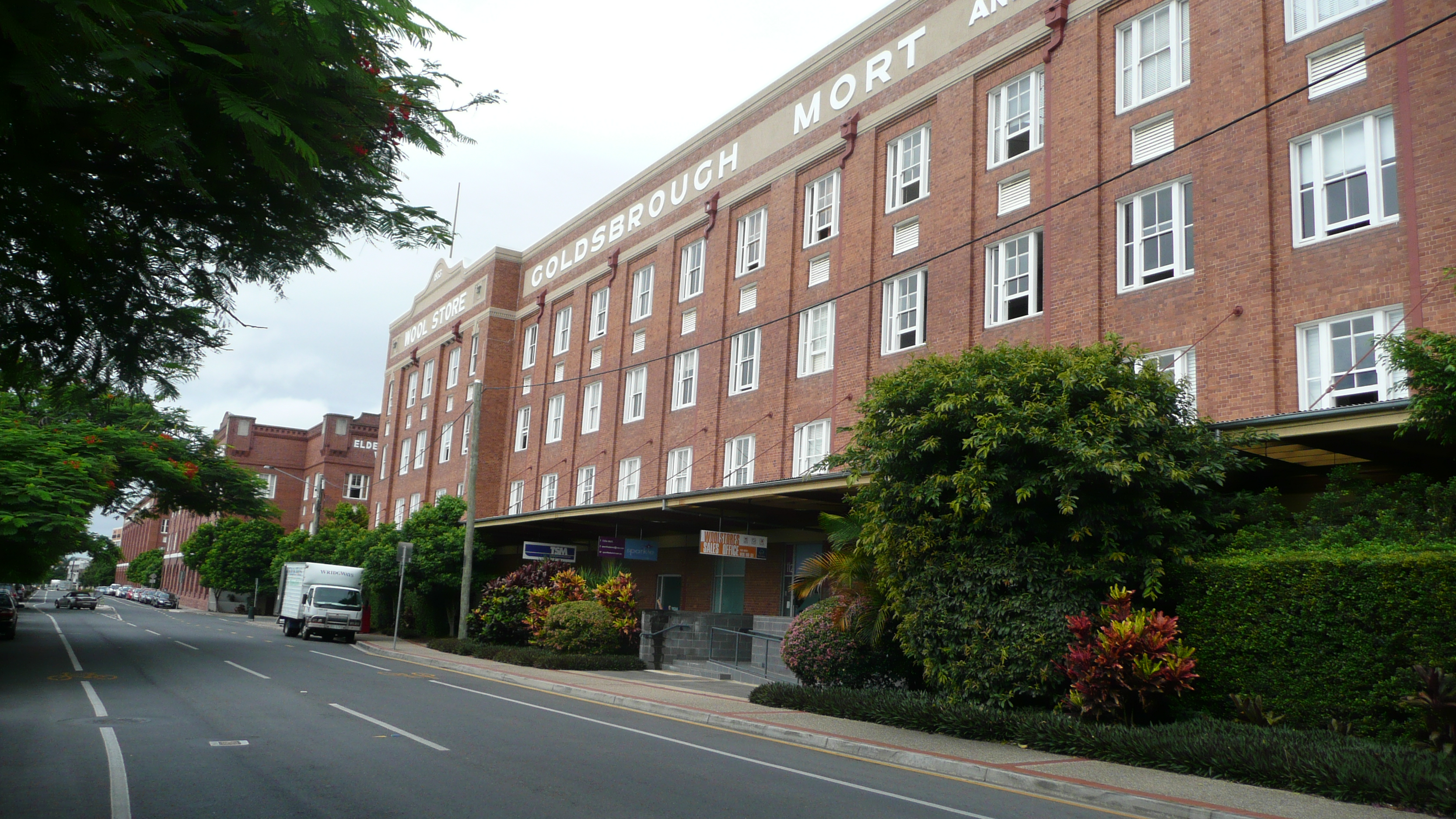
- Goldsbrough Mort & Co. Wool Store, 2010

- Location within Queensland Location within Australia
- 27.4584°S 153.0496°E
- Location: 88 Macquarie Street, Teneriffe, City of Brisbane, Queensland, Australia

History
- Design period: 1919–1930s (interwar period)
- Built: c. 1933
- Built for: Goldsbrough Mort & Co.

Queensland Heritage Register
- Official name: Goldsbrough Mort Woolstore
- Type: state heritage (built)
- Designated: 21 October 1992
- Reference no.: 600323
- Significant period: 1930s (fabric) c. 1933–1980s (historical use)
- Builders: Stuart Brothers (Sydney)

Goldsbrough Mort Woolstore is a heritage-listed warehouse at 88 Macquarie Street, Teneriffe, City of Brisbane, Queensland, Australia. It was built c. 1933 by Stuart Brothers (Sydney). It was added to the Queensland Heritage Register on 21 October 1992.

== History ==
The site was part of the Teneriffe hillside alienated in 1854 by James Gibbon, a prominent local resident, land investor and later member of the Queensland Legislative Council. Subsequent landowners include the Financial Guarantee & Agency Co. of Queensland Ltd and the Brisbane Stevedoring & Wool Dumping Co. Ltd. Goldsbrough Mort, a prosperous southern-based pastoral house (est. 1888), opened its first Queensland office in Rockhampton, followed by Brisbane in the early 1910s.

The Teneriffe property of 1 acre (0.40 ha) 3 roods (33,000 sq ft; 3,000 m^{2}) was purchased in 1922. For about £17,000 the Stuart Brothers built this small woolstore, the first known structure on this site, thereby taking advantage of the 1933 buoyant wool prices and labour market following the depths of the great depression. Beeston Street, which separates the Goldsbrough Mort and Elder Smith stores, had been put through in 1927 and named after Joseph Beeston, the longstanding company secretary of Dath Henderson & Co. Ltd earlier in the century.

The property was acquired by Elders in 1963 and by Oxlade Investments, of the Mayfairs group of companies, in 1984. Elders leased the whole of the building in 1985 and used the ground floor for offices and their rural merchandise store. The third level was used for wool sorting by Brisbane Classing Facilities. The ground floor office is currently occupied by Chevron Discount Furnishers and part of the first floor is rented for the storage of office records. The property is zoned in the Brisbane City Council's Teneriffe Development Plan (1986) for residential or market retail purposes.

== Description ==
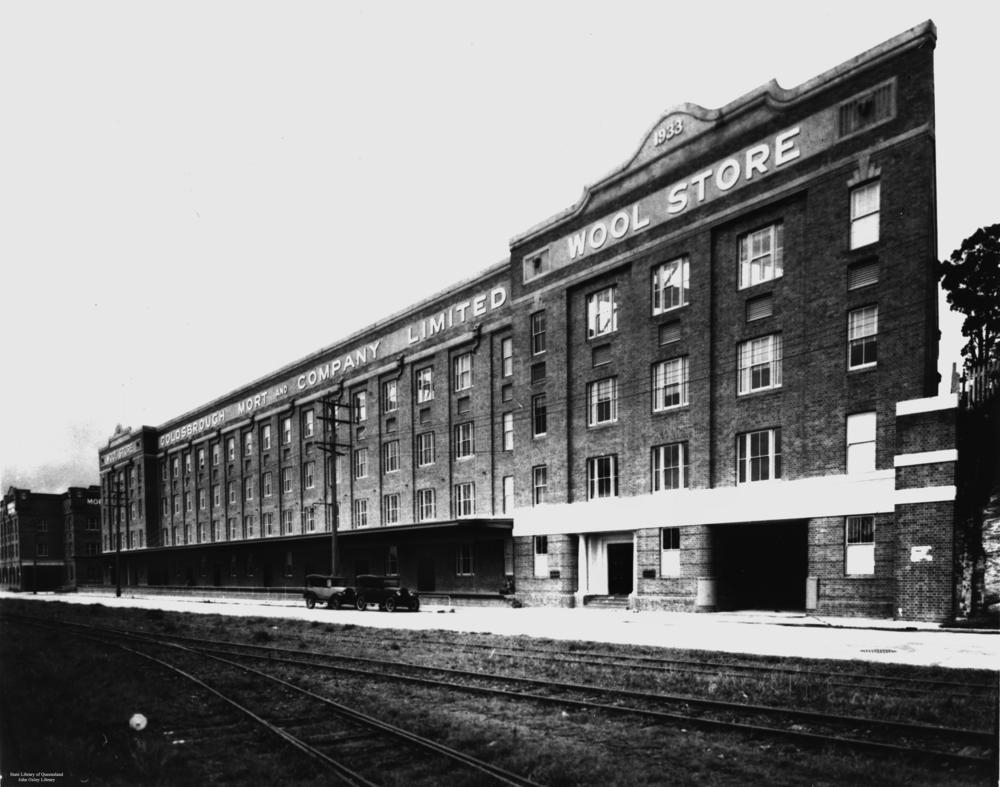
Goldsborough Mort Woolstore, circa 1930s

Goldsbrough Mort & Co. Ltd No 2 woolstore is a four-storey brick and timber structure with a symmetrical facade and restrained decoration. The northern end is built into the steep Teneriffe hillside. Constructed during the Interwar era, its recessed central section is separated by slightly projecting bays on either side. In keeping with other woolstores and commercial buildings of this period, a tripartite division of base, shaft and entablature is apparent in its functional form.

The store's projecting frontal bays, red brick piers and triple window openings separated by downpipes provide a degree of verticality. Nevertheless, the dominant emphasis above and below the upper floors is horizontal. This is achieved by means of a strong cornice line, which is surmounted by brick bands and a rendered frieze displaying the company name and construction date between moulded merino sheep heads. This is topped by an emphatic parapet with notched and curved gable pediments as well as flagpoles above the projecting bays. The upper levels are distinguished from the ground floor base line by a straight corrugated iron awning supported by iron rods which shelters the railway siding and loading bays.

Though the main entrance is at the southern end near Beeston Street, a second ornate entrance in the righthand front bay has Greek columns and steps that lead through multi-panelled central-opening doors to office accommodation. Since the load born by each ascending floor lessens, so do the supporting walls, piers and corbels. As usual the ground floor is concreted and wool bale storage modules on the first two levels are defined by solid timber posts and beams.

Tubular steel posts are employed on the third level, while the top floor utilised steel ties to truss the vertical section of the sawtooth roof, thereby achieving a span of 30 metres (98 ft) which required only a central row of steel columns. The showroom also has square vents with timber louvers beneath the windows, and the customary sawtooth roof aligned from east to west for optimum lighting.

== Heritage listing ==
Goldsbrough Mort Woolstore was listed on the Queensland Heritage Register on 21 October 1992 having satisfied the following criteria.

The place is important in demonstrating the evolution or pattern of Queensland's history.

The Goldsbrough Mort woolstore is most significant in its own right and for its heritage contribution to the Teneriffe precinct. It reflects important developments, technological features and marketing procedures in Queensland's wool industry since the 1930s as well as the history of commerce along the Brisbane River and of the pastoral companies concerned.

The place demonstrates rare, uncommon or endangered aspects of Queensland's cultural heritage.

In keeping with other woolstores of similar vintage (e.g. Queensland Primary Producers No 4 Woolstore), this illustrates particularly well the 1930s stage of development in an industrial process which is now redundant; it is also the only remaining Goldsbrough Mort woolstore in Queensland.

The place is important in demonstrating the principal characteristics of a particular class of cultural places.

In form and fabric, this structure is an excellent example of the broad class of brick and timber woolstores which were built in Australian ports, including Teneriffe, to serve the wool industry.

In keeping with other woolstores of similar vintage (e.g. Queensland Primary Producers No 4 Woolstore), this illustrates particularly well the 1930s stage of development in an industrial process which is now redundant; it is also the only remaining Goldsbrough Mort woolstore in Queensland.

The place is important because of its aesthetic significance.

This structure also has considerable visual impact due to its substantial form and attractive Interwar design, especially its balanced pedimented bays.

The place has a strong or special association with a particular community or cultural group for social, cultural or spiritual reasons.

That this woolstore, with its significant pastoral and business connections, is a valued asset and a local landmark, has been recognised by its inclusion in the Teneriffe Development Plan.
