= Richard Goldsbrough =

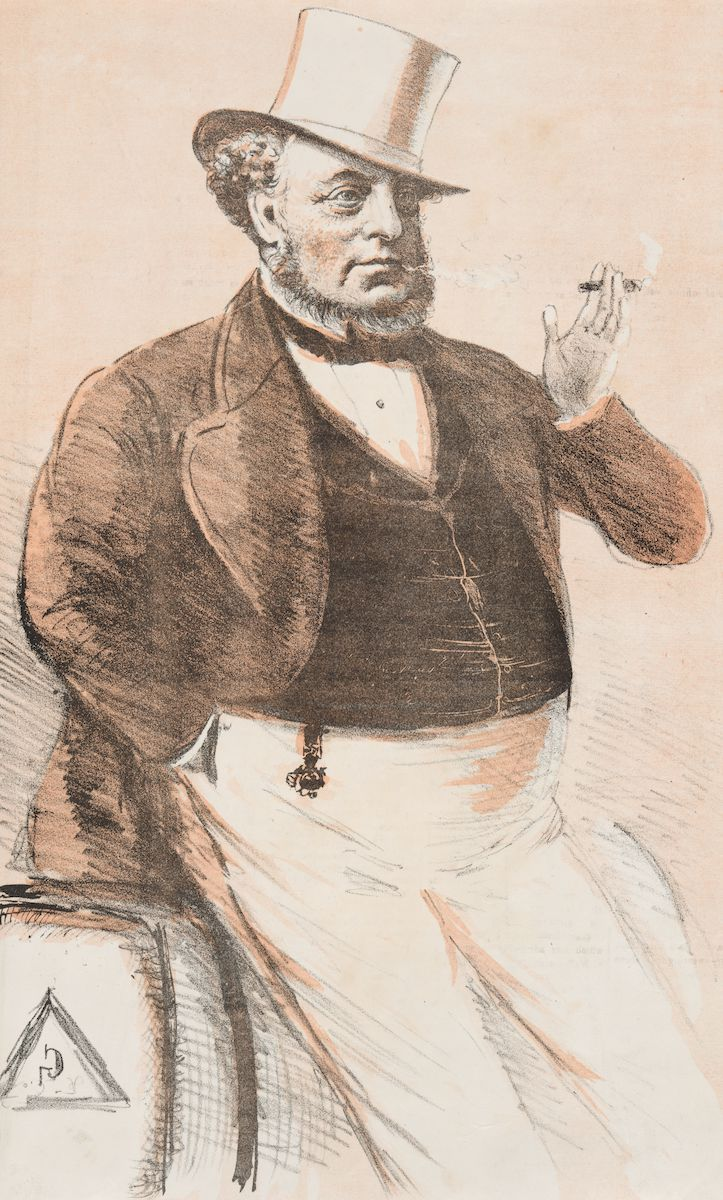
- "Colonial John Bull" in the 1874 Weekly Times
- Born: 17 October 1821
- Died: 8 April 1886 (aged 64)
- Occupation: wool merchant
- Spouse: Emma Hodgson
- Children: c.3

Richard Goldsbrough (17 October 1821 – 8 April 1886) was an English-born Australian businessman who was involved in the wool industry in the 19th century.

Goldsbrough took little part in public life, although he was a steward of the Victoria Racing Club from its formation in 1864 until 1886.

== Early life ==
Goldsbrough was born in Shipley, Yorkshire, the only son of Joshua Goldsbrough, a butcher, and his wife Hannah, née Speight.

== Career in Australia ==
In Melbourne, in 1848 he bought a weatherboard building on the corner of Williams Street and Flinders Lane and went into business as a classer and packer and as a buyer of wool for sale in England. In 1850 he set up the first regular wool auction in Bourke St, Melbourne. In 1853 he went into partnership with Edward Row and George Kirk under the name of E. Row and Company. He prospered and was able to buy a substantial bluestone warehouse and a second one in 1857 at the corner of Bourke and William Streets. In the 1870s Goldsbrough was also associated with Alexander Robertson, John Wagner and Salathiel Booth in several properties.

In 1874 his portrait by Tom Durkin appeared as "Colonial John Bull" in the Weekly Times.

== Death and legacy ==
Goldsbrough died at Melbourne from an internal tumour on 8 April 1886. His cellar after his death was reported to have over 680 litres of whisky, over 450 litres of sherry and over 300 litres of brandy. He and his wife, Emma Hodgson (1822–1877), probably had three children, all of whom died young in Yorkshire. Goldsbrough died without a surviving wife or children. In 1888, his partners merged with the Sydney firm of Mort & Co. to form Goldsbrough Mort & Co. Ltd. In 1963, the firm merged again to form Elder Smith Goldsbrough Mort Ltd which traded under that name until 1982. The present day business is Elders Limited.

== See also ==
- Thomas Sutcliffe Mort
