= Fortitude Valley Child Health Centre =

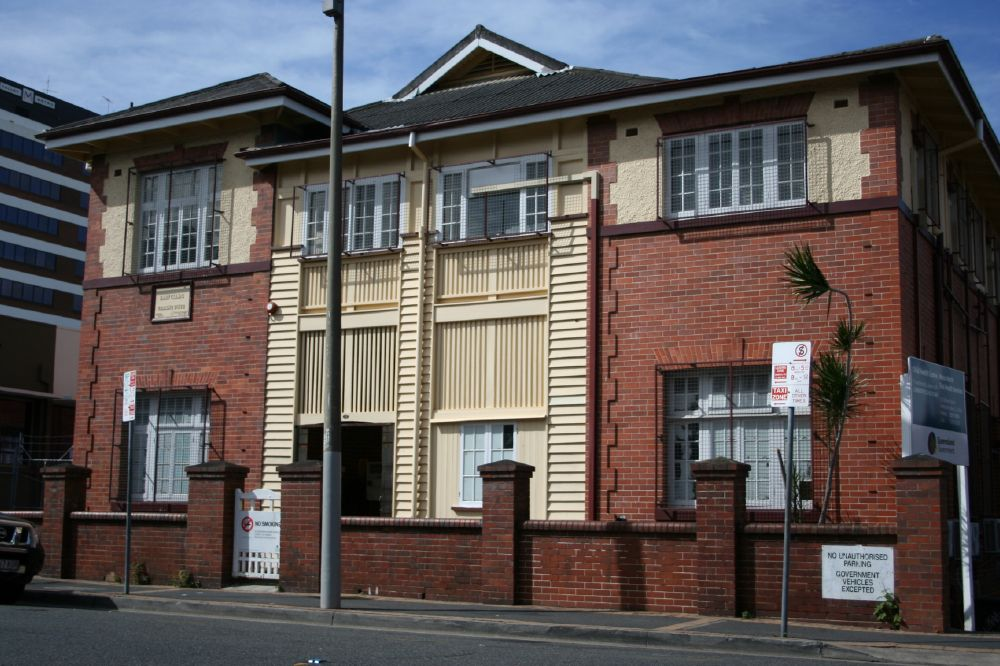
- Fortitude Valley Child Health Centre, 2010

- Location within Queensland Location within Australia
- 27.4562°S 153.0331°E
- Location: 112 Alfred Street, Fortitude Valley, Queensland, Australia

History
- Design period: 1919–1930s (interwar period)

Site notes
- Architect: Cecil James Virgo
- Architectural style: Arts & Crafts

Queensland Heritage Register
- Official name: Fortitude Valley Child Health Centre, Fortitude Valley Baby Clinic & Nurse Training Centre
- Type: state heritage (built)
- Designated: 12 August 2011
- Reference no.: 602788
- Significant period: 1923–present

Fortitude Valley Child Health Centre is a heritage-listed clinic at 112 Alfred Street, Fortitude Valley, Queensland, Australia. It was designed by Cecil James Virgo. It is also known as Fortitude Valley Baby Clinic & Nurse Training Centre. It was added to the Queensland Heritage Register on 12 August 2011.

== History ==
The Fortitude Valley Child Health Centre was constructed in 1923 as a baby clinic, maternity and infant nurse training centre, and administrative headquarters for baby clinics in the state and has been operating continuously for child health care since. It was the first purpose-built maternal and child welfare nurse training centre in Queensland following the introduction of the Maternity Act 1922 which was part of a national and international movement to improve the health of mothers and babies.

Queensland infant death rates were high at the turn of the 20th century. Dr Alfred Jefferis Turner, the Brisbane Children's Hospital's first resident medical officer appointed in 1889, was instrumental in reducing the death rate through his work on developing a diphtheria antitoxin which he introduced to Brisbane in 1894. Dr Turner then embarked on a further public health campaign, educating mothers in the hygienic preparation of food, particularly for those infants not breast fed, as diarrhoea remained a major factor in infant deaths.

Such initiatives reflected a growing international move towards the reduction of infant mortality through maternal education. Both England and Germany established Schools for Mothers in 1905. In New Zealand, the Royal Society for the Health of Women was founded in 1907 by Dr Frederic Truby King. His emphasis was on the promotion of breast feeding, the training of nurses in maternal and infant welfare and the education of parents in domestic hygiene.

In 1908 Dr Turner established the first infant welfare clinic in Brisbane. He saw up to 100 babies a week, free of charge, although this clinic was a short-lived operation due to a lack of funds. Ongoing lobbying for the establishment of baby clinics was undertaken by the Woman's Christian Temperance Union, the Queensland Women's Electoral League and the National Council of Women of Queensland. Following a child welfare conference in Sydney in 1916, the establishment of three (later expanded to four) Queensland baby clinics was announced by the Home Secretary John Huxham in August 1917. At that time there were 11 clinics in New South Wales and one in Victoria. South Australia had adopted the English/German model of the School for Mothers, opening its first Institute in Adelaide in September 1911. Huxham travelled to Sydney and Melbourne in January 1918, to assess these clinics in preparation for planning the Brisbane baby clinics.

The first Queensland Government baby clinic opened in a rented cottage in Brunswick Street, near Robertson Street, Fortitude Valley on 8 March 1918, managed by Matron Florence Chatfield of the Diamantina Hospital. In the early decades of the 20th century Fortitude Valley was a popular residential area. It had become an important commercial and retail district in the late nineteenth century following its establishment in the 1850s with the expansion of the settlement of the town of Brisbane. The three other clinics opened shortly after at Woolloongabba, Spring Hill and West End.

Public health and social reform was implicit in the growth of the town planning movement and in mid-1918 at the second Australian Town Planning Conference and Exhibition held in Brisbane, a display provided advice on bathing, clothing and proper nutrition of infants. The organiser of this conference was Charles Edward Chuter, an officer of the Home Secretary's Department, who was to have a significant impact on the Queensland health system. Charles Chuter initiated the funding of facilities for mothers and infants through the Golden Casket lottery, where profits were allocated to the Motherhood, Child Welfare and Hospital Fund. The government assumed management of lotteries in 1920.

The profits generated through the Golden Casket facilitated the implementation of the Maternity Act 1922. The introduction of this Act was a turning point in health services for women and children in Queensland. It provided for the establishment of maternity hospitals and baby clinics throughout the state. The policy had four aims: to decrease the death rate of mothers and babies, to increase the birth rate, to increase outback settlement, and to train mothers in how to care for children. A Labor government initiative, the Maternity Act 1922 had been formulated in a social and political context where the issue of fostering and developing a healthy and virile population was closely linked to the economic development of the state.

On 22 January 1923 the Daily Standard declared that Labor's noblest legislation was about to take practical form with the construction of a maternal and child welfare clinic and training school for nurses in Fortitude Valley. A brief for the clinic had been prepared by Chuter and included the accommodation of a lecture room, the usual equipment for a clinic, and a ward with three beds to accommodate mothers. It was to be the headquarters of the Maternal and Child Welfare Clinics in Queensland and the distribution centre for supplies and literature. The building was designed by Queensland Department of Public Works' architect, Cecil James Virgo (1895–1976). His work includes a number of fine public buildings of the interwar period - Coorparoo State School (1929–34), Mackay Central State School (1933), Milton State School (1935), and Toowoomba North State School (1937).

Virgo's work is representative of the high-quality design that the department produced during the interwar period. Typically the work was classically inspired though executed in contemporary styles with a conscious emphasis on giving institutional buildings a domestic character. These were constructed with high-quality materials and workmanship to achieve economical but long-lasting buildings.

A site in Alfred Street, Fortitude Valley containing two cottages was purchased from local merchant Thomas Charles Beirne for the sum of £850. The new site was in a central location close to the shopping area and to public transport with the Brunswick Street railway station directly adjacent. At that time a cottage near the corner of Alfred Street was refurbished for use as the clinic, while the second cottage was sold for removal enabling the construction of the new purpose-built clinic and nurse training centre. The brick building of two-storeys and basement was commenced in 1923, and was nearing completion in October when it was discovered that the Brisbane City Council intended to sewer the area, delaying it being finished while the drainage was altered. The Department of Public Works reported on 4 January 1924 that the building was completed, pending the connection to the sewerage. Matron Chatfield moved in on 15 January, although the opening of the new clinic was delayed until October 1924 waiting for drainage approvals. The building cost £5,000.

The new Fortitude Valley Baby Clinic and Nurse Training Centre (now known as the Fortitude Valley Child Health Centre) had a timber verandah on both levels at the front and rear with timber lattice screening. The ground floor contained the clinic with waiting room and doctor's and treatment rooms as well as the resident nurses-in-training accommodation with a day room, bathroom and kitchen. The first floor held the training centre with a large lecture room and ward to house three mothers and their babies, the Superintendent Nurse's bedroom and a sitting room. The basement was used for storage and laundry. Brisbane City Council's Parks Division laid out the grounds at a cost of £20 that was borne by the Home Secretary. The floors were originally stained and polished timber, but by November 1925 a request was made to purchase linoleum to be installed throughout, because the slippery floors were considered dangerous to mothers and children.

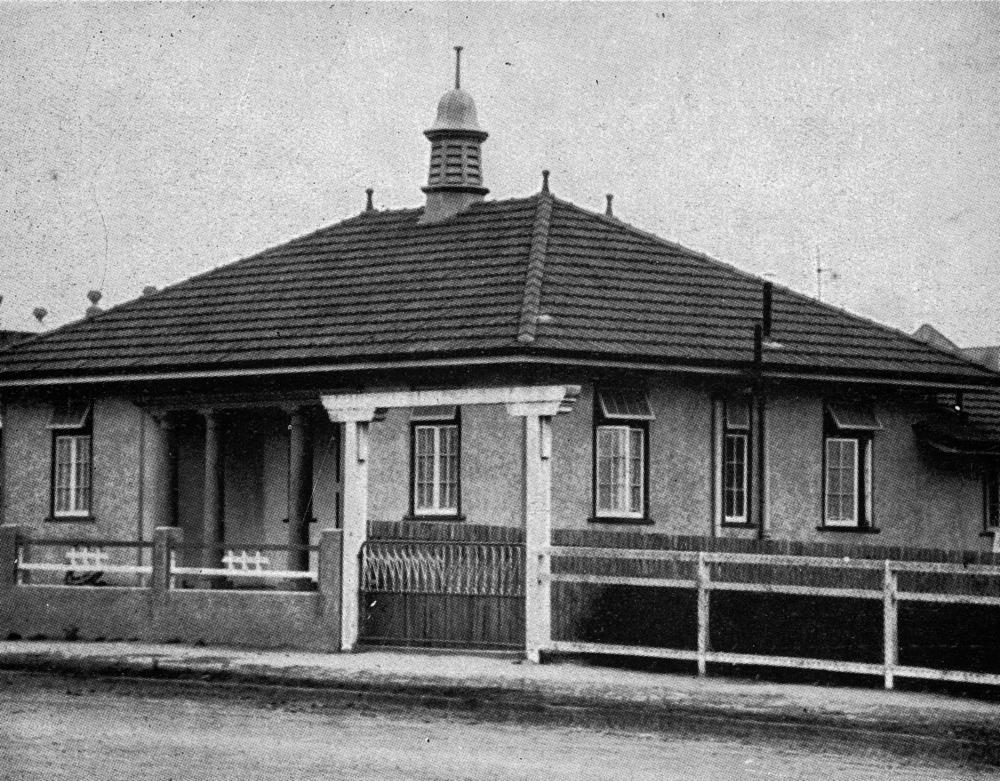
Baby clinic in Warwick, Queensland, 1932

The first nurses at the centre were trained elsewhere. Nurse Barron, trained at the Karitane Nursing School in New Zealand, was the head of the establishment. Three other nurses trained at the Tresillian Child Welfare Centre in Sydney. The first four-month training course for Queensland nurses commenced at the end of 1924. It produced eight graduates, trained in the Truby King Mothercraft system, followed by a further eleven in 1925. These nurses went on to run new baby clinics, including those at Rockhampton, Townsville, Ipswich, Toowoomba, Cairns, Maryborough, Bundaberg, Gympie, Mackay, Charters Towers, Woolloongabba and Warwick all constructed between October 1923 and February 1930. Apart from the Cairns clinic, the remaining ten regional clinics were of a standardised design. Thirty-five maternity wards were built in hospitals across the state at this time.

In 1925–26 the Fortitude Valley Child Health Centre had the highest number of attendances and visits to newborns compared with others in operation located in Herschel Street in Brisbane City, West End, Woolloongabba, and Wynnum South. As headquarters for Queensland's baby clinics, administration of the clinics was performed from the building until around 1942 with clinics being sent "rules" attempting to standardise the quality of health care throughout the state. Dr Turner was appointed part-time director of the Department of Infant Welfare in July 1926 and he and Nurse Barron began travelling the state lecturing and writing about the need for high standards of infant care.

By July 1927 the number of patients attending the clinic for treatment had increased and accommodation was insufficient. The front verandah was enclosed with asbestos cement sheeting and venetian blinds for more room. In the same year the rear verandah was enclosed with sliding sashes to form a bedroom for the Superintendent Nurse and her previous room was converted to an office. With increased staff numbers, the rear verandah on the ground floor was enclosed with sashes to form a dining room. In 1928 a portion of the ground floor, front verandah was enclosed with sashes to give mothers and their babies' greater privacy from the street.

The Fortitude Valley Child Health Centre was expanded in 1929 to include ante-natal care (pre-birth health care) and during the 1930s the accommodation at the clinic was regularly overtaxed. A large clinic was planned for South Brisbane at this time but was never built. Legislation introduced in 1932 made it compulsory for all births to be notified to the district registrar within 48 hours. The registrar then had to inform the nearest clinic within 24 hours.

In 1933 the building was painted externally and the old kalsomine paint was removed from the interior walls, which were then repainted.

The baby clinic system continued to expand during the 1930s. Nurses travelled the state in a specially fitted out rail car, equipped as a baby clinic, lecture room and staff quarters. A number of regional sub-centres were established from 1929, and these were also accessed by nurses travelling by rail. By 1938 the rail car was limited to the north-west corner of the state and the remainder was serviced by 26 baby clinics and 78 sub-centres. Both Dr Turner and Nurse Barron retired in 1938. In 1939 the name of the service was changed from the Department of Infant Welfare, to the Maternal and Child Welfare Department.

In 1938, a 4.5-metre (15 ft) wide two-storey extension with basement was added to the Alfred Street building along the entire south-western side adding many new rooms and additional space. The extension was designed by Public Works architect Francis Lionel Jones in matching style and detail to the original building. The verandah roof was altered so as to be continuous from the main roof. In 1940 the upper level, front verandah was enclosed with casements and a fire stair was added to the back verandah. This extension was used as a Mothercraft home. The 1938 Annual Report of the Acting Director of Infant Welfare, Dr THR Matthewson, reported that the Alfred Street Clinic had taken in some premature and delicate babies and their mothers, including a set of triplets, all of whom had made satisfactory progress. There was a demonstrated need for a designated mothercraft home, but at that time the service could only be offered during the time that nurses were in training, which only occurred for eight months of the year.

In 1938 Dr Matthewson initiated an informal correspondence service for mothers unable to attend local clinics. The following year he reported that lectures and demonstration of infant feeding were given to four doctors at the request of the British Medical Association, and that Lady Phyllis Cilento, Lecturer in Mothercraft at the University of Queensland, attended the Alfred Street Clinic with her class of medical students on two occasions for demonstrations on care, management and feeding of infants.

During the war, the clinic service particularly monitored families who had to be evacuated from areas where invasion seemed imminent. The petrol shortage led to an establishment of clinics in every suburb, amounting to 38 by 1942. Dr Matthewson was permanently appointed to the position of medical director in August 1941. At that time the facilities at the Alfred Street building were overcrowded. The Department of Defence which had occupied the Lady Lamington Hospital, vacated it, allowing for the Director, Superintendent, clerical staff, the nurses in charge of the correspondence centre, and ante-natal service to be relocated to this building. The correspondence service was able to be formalised from the new location.

The Mothercraft residential service could then be properly established at St Paul's Terrace, and housed 29 mothers and 53 infants during its first year, compared with 18 mothers and 31 infants who had been housed at Alfred Street the previous year. The Training School was relocated to St Paul's Terrace in 1942, and nurses accommodated in a nearby boarding house. A second Mothercraft Home opened in Clayfield in 1943. Mothercraft facilities were expanded with the opening of "Unara" in Toowoomba in 1947, the Jefferis Turner Home in Ipswich in August 1952, and the Rockhampton Home in September 1952.

By 1950 the infant mortality rate was reduced to fewer than 25 deaths per thousand births. New clinics were established in regional centres and many of the early clinic buildings were either extended or sold and larger buildings provided. Dr Jean McFarlane, who had become Deputy Director General in 1957, began regular television appearances in the early 1960s advising mothers on the management of their babies. By 1975, Queensland recorded the lowest ever recorded infant mortality rate of 15 deaths per 1000 live births.

Major changes in the function of the Fortitude Valley Child Health Centre occurred from this time. During 1975 some administrative staff relocated to the first section of a new building under construction on the site of the former Lady Lamington Hospital, in St Paul's Terrace. It opened in November 1977 and included a Mothercraft Home and Nurse Training Centre. In 1978 the Maternal Child Welfare Service celebrated its 60th Jubilee. During this time the Fortitude Valley Child Health Centre continued to operate as a baby clinic although the use of the entire building had somewhat diminished since the 1941 relocation of the administrative, training and residential functions. Consequently, little alteration has been made to the building fabric since then. In 1997, the directorate of Queensland Health's Oral Health Service moved into the building and in 2011 occupied the upper level and two offices on the ground level. Community Child Health Services continues to occupy the remainder of the ground level of the building.

The building was sold in December 2016. In May 2018 a proposal was made to redevelop the property as an office and two apartments, which would require partial demolition of the building.

== Description ==
The Fortitude Valley Child Health Centre, formerly the Maternal and Child Welfare Clinic, is a two-storey brick structure with part basement, located on a sloping site facing north-west and fronting Alfred Street. The building is in an Arts and Crafts style and sits slightly back from its front boundary behind a brick fence with tall, capped piers and a simple, timber gate.

The building has a hipped roof of corrugated, asbestos cement sheet with projecting, ventilated gables at the ridge. The exterior front and side walls are red face brick in English bond to the basement and front verandah, and stretcher bond up to the sill level of the first floor, above which the treatment is painted, pebble-dash stucco to the timber eaves. Face brick quoining extends the height of both levels and the upper-level windows have face brick lintels. Windows are typically timber casements of eight panes with fanlights and cement rendered sills. Some windows/fanlights have been removed and replaced with fixed panes or sheet material for ventilation ducts. Most are shielded by steel mesh security panels on steel frames attached to the building. Two upper-level windows on the north-east elevation have timber hoods. Mounted on the building at ground floor level are many air-handling units with ducting running up the face of the building.

A cement render plaque on the front facade reads "BABY CLINIC TRAINING CENTRE, ERECTED 1923 AD, HON W McCORMACK, HOME SEC.Y". The rear verandah on two levels, supported on an English bond brick wall, is enclosed with painted weatherboards and a variety of windows, some of which date to the 1927 enclosure. A 1940 timber fire stair runs down the rear elevation from the upper level to the ground floor but not to the rear yard.

Entrance is through a central verandah flush with the Alfred Street facade. On both the ground and first levels, the verandah is timber and has simple, painted timber battening, balustrade, and weatherboards. The verandah is partially enclosed by timber casements, fixed glass, and sheet fixed behind the balustrade. The ground floor retains an early, steel, expandable security gate and early timber bench. The front door has been replaced with a modern one but the original may survive in the doors that are stacked in the basement.

The room layout corresponds very closely to the 1940 reconfiguration. This comprises a large central space with stair that is a reception area on the ground level and a waiting area on the upper level that gives access to rooms on three sides.

The building retains its original partitions, constructed of cement plaster on vertical steel rods and metal lathe. The rooms on the enclosed front and rear verandahs have walls lined with vertically jointed tongue and groove boards The ceilings throughout the core of the building are lined with flat sheet and timber cover battens in a simple geometric pattern and on the upper level there are ventilation panels that have been sheeted closed with the grille potentially surviving behind. The ceilings to the enclosed verandah are lined with vertically jointed tongue and groove boards with the exception of the front ground floor which has a ceiling lined with ripple iron. No original ceiling fittings have been retained with modern light fixtures and ceiling fans found throughout. The cornice is a square, timber cover strip. Internally, windows and doors have distinctive, tapered timber architraves. Generally the doors have 3 panels and are high-waisted, and almost all retain their original hardware including keyhole covers. Those opening onto the now enclosed verandahs are French with low waists and twelve lights in the upper section of each leaf. Door panel mouldings and skirtings differ between the original building and later extension. Windows, where original, are multi-paned, retain original hardware, and most have had their glass painted out. The skirtings are timber and are a simple ogee in the oldest part and a simple splay in the 1938 extension. The floors are linoleum sheets and tiles, or carpet throughout. The original crows ash timber flooring may survive underneath. The central spaces on both levels have chair rails and the first floor waiting area contains a picture rail.

Most of the original fittings remain including plumbing items, joinery, architraves, dado rails, and an impressive silky oak staircase. The enclosed portion of the front verandah on the ground floor also contains many early items that have been gathered over time and relate to baby clinic functions including baby-weighing scales, metal cots, photos of nurses, and a variety of furniture. The basement contains some early or original doors removed from the upper levels. There is narrow vehicular access to the rear of the site along the south-west side of the building. Nothing remains of the original garden. The rear boundary is shared with the Fortitude Valley Railway Station and has a high chain wire fence with barbed wire security.

== Heritage listing ==
Fortitude Valley Child Health Centre was listed on the Queensland Heritage Register on 12 August 2011 having satisfied the following criteria.

The place is important in demonstrating the evolution or pattern of Queensland's history.

The Fortitude Valley Child Health Centre (1923) is important in demonstrating the development of Queensland Government health and social policy as it was the first training centre for maternal and child welfare nurses in the state, the headquarters and administration centre for all other baby clinics in the state, operated as one of the first baby clinics, and provided accommodation for mothers. Built as a Queensland Government initiative following the introduction of the Maternity Act 1922 and with funding from the state-operated lottery, the Golden Casket, it is important in demonstrating the government response to the early twentieth century Australia-wide movement to educate mothers in infant welfare and domestic hygiene, aimed at reducing the infant mortality rate.

The place demonstrates rare, uncommon or endangered aspects of Queensland's cultural heritage.

Remaining as one of the two operational child health clinics from a group of 13 built across the state between 1923 and 1930, the Fortitude Valley Child Health Centre is significant for being highly intact and, as of 2011, having been in continuous use as a child health centre.

The place is important in demonstrating the principal characteristics of a particular class of cultural places.

The Fortitude Valley Child Health Centre is highly intact and important in demonstrating the principal characteristics of a purpose-built maternal and child welfare clinic, which include the spacious waiting area, doctor's room, treatment room and nurse accommodation. It also includes a nurse training centre incorporating a lecture room, and mother and baby accommodation consisting of wards, sitting room and laundry and ironing rooms.

The Fortitude Valley Child Health Centre is an example of an interwar Queensland Department of Public Works institutional building characterised by its design and materials and constructed with decorative treatments to achieve a domestic scale and character suited to its use.
