= Fortitude Valley =

- Suburb
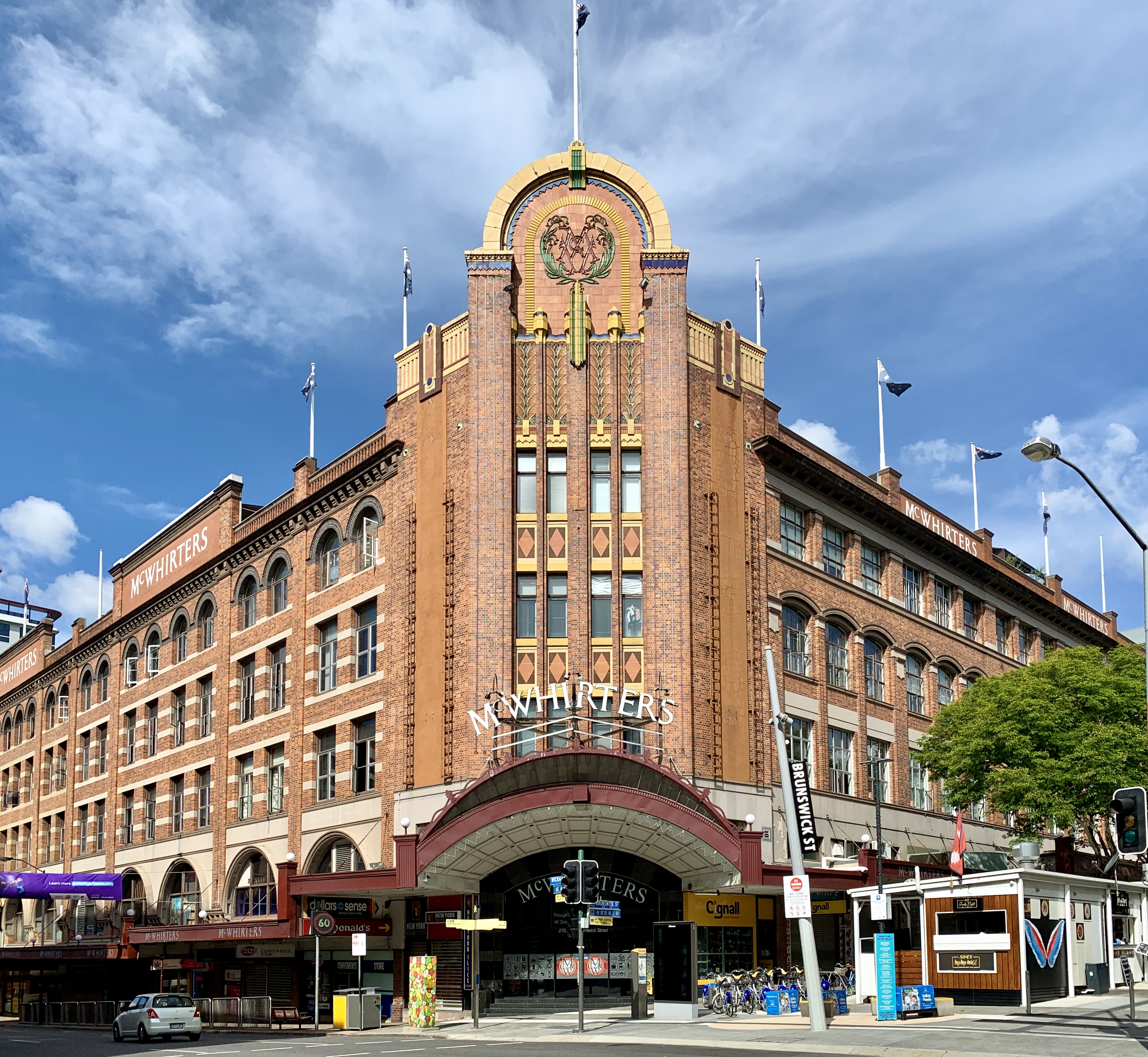
- McWhirters department store

- Interactive map of Fortitude Valley
- Coordinates: 27.4566°S 153.0372°E
- Country: Australia
- State: Queensland
- City: Brisbane
- LGA: City of Brisbane (Central Ward)
- Location: 1.6 km (0.99 mi) NE of Brisbane CBD

Government
  - State electorate: McConnel
  - Federal division: Brisbane

Area
  - Total: 1.4 km^{2} (0.54 sq mi)
- Elevation: 18 m (59 ft)

Population
  - Total: 9,708 (2021 census)
  - Density: 6,930/km^{2} (18,000/sq mi)
- Time zone: UTC+10:00 (AEST)
- Postcode: 4006
- County: Stanley
- Parish: North Brisbane
Suburbs around Fortitude Valley
Bowen Hills	Bowen Hills	Newstead
Spring Hill	Fortitude Valley	Teneriffe
Brisbane City	Kangaroo Point	New Farm

Fortitude Valley (often called "The Valley" by local residents) is an inner suburb of the City of Brisbane, the state capital of Queensland, Australia. In the 2021 census, Fortitude Valley had a population of 9,708 people. The suburb features two pedestrian malls at Brunswick Street and Chinatown, and is a key hub for Brisbane's nightlife, known for its nightclubs, bars, live music and adult entertainment.

== Geography ==
Fortitude Valley is built upon a low-lying marshy flat, immediately northeast of the Brisbane central business district.

== History ==
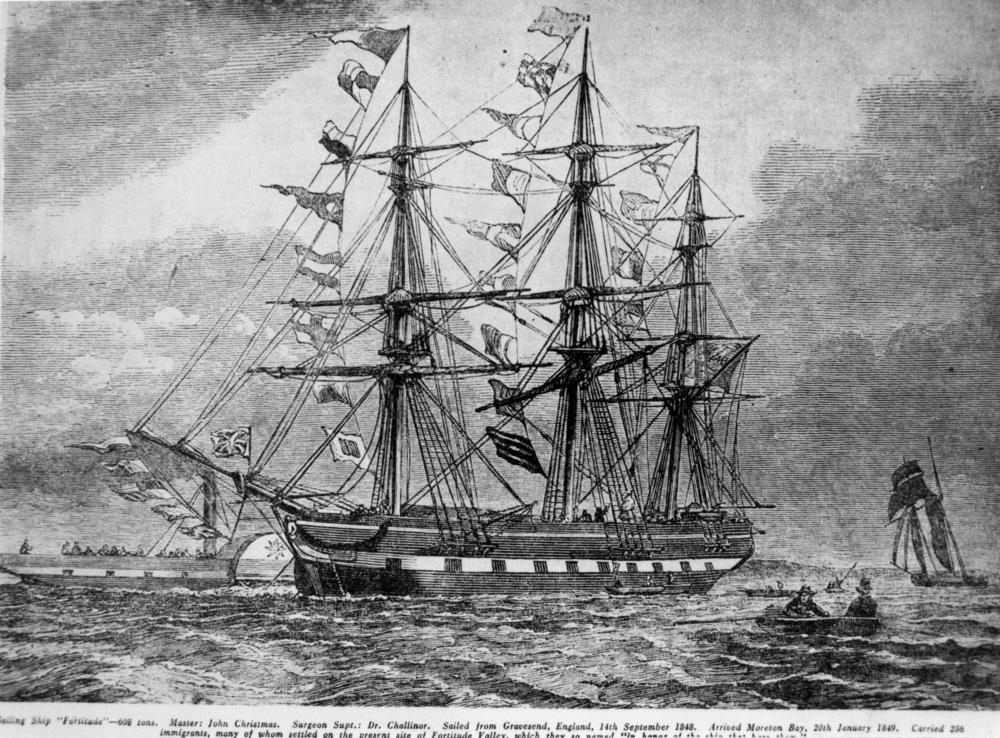
The Fortitude

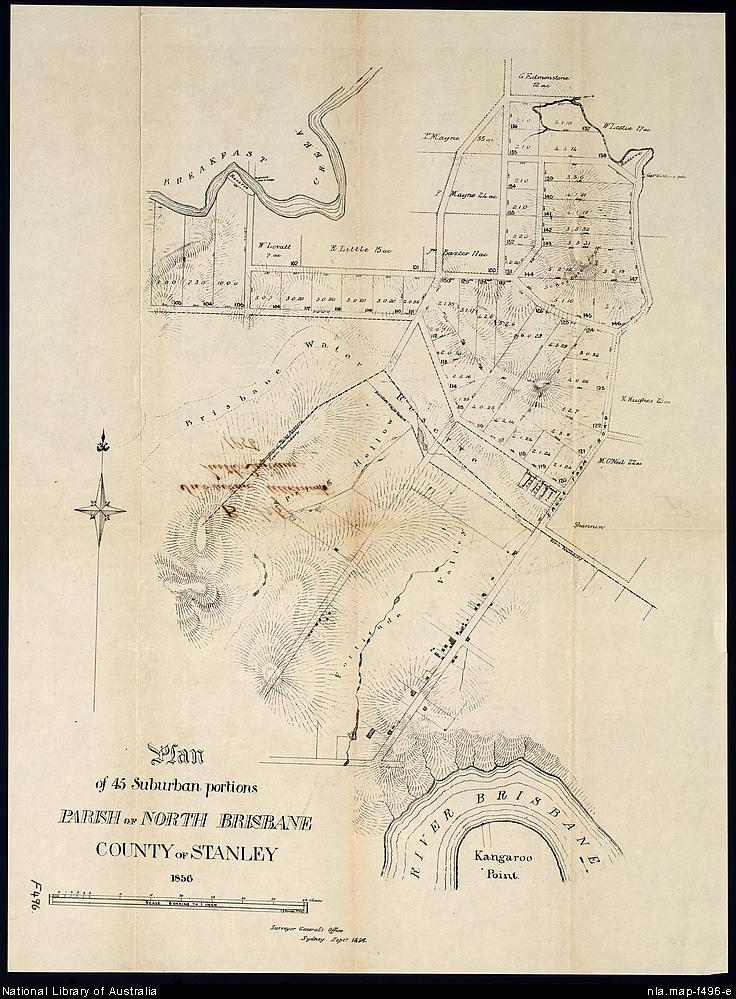
19th century cadastral map showing land plots for sale in Fortitude Valley.

Originally inhabited by the Meanjin peoples of the Turrbal and Jagera/Yuggera Indigenous groups. Later on, Scottish immigrants from the ship Fortitude arrived in Brisbane in 1849 in hopes to take the land, enticed by Rev Dr John Dunmore Lang on the promise of free land grants. Denied land, the immigrants set up camp in York's Hollow waterholes in the vicinity of today's Victoria Park, Herston. A number of the immigrants moved on and settled the suburb, naming it after the ship on which they arrived.

Fortitude Valley National School opened on 4 March 1861 in a hall attached to the Foresters' Arms Hotel near the corner of Ann and Brunswick Streets, diagonally opposite the Royal George Hotel. The first purpose-built school opened at 95 Brookes Street on 12 August 1867. In 1874 an additional building was erected at 99 Brookes Street and the school was split into two separate departments – Fortitude Valley Boys' State School, and Fortitude Valley Girls' and Infants' State School. The year 1887 witnessed the opening of a further new school building for boys at 85 Brookes Street and in 1888 the Girls' and Infants' School was split again to create Fortitude Valley Girls' State School, and Fortitude Valley Infants' State School. In 1950 the Boys' and the Girls' campuses were amalgamated as the Fortitude Valley State School on the site of the former 1887 boys' school which was demolished in 1948/49. In 1951, the Infants' School merged with the Fortitude Valley State School. The school closed in December 2013 due to low student numbers, despite a prolonged campaign by parents and students to keep it open. The Queensland Government argued that there was another school only 1.5 kilometres (0.93 mi) away that could accommodate the students. However, it was reopened in January 2020 as Fortitude Valley State Secondary College in response to a growing population in the area. It was Brisbane's first new inner city school in more than 50 years, built vertically to fit in with the increased population density of the suburb.

A Primitive Methodist church opened in October 1861 in Windmill Street (now McLachlan Street).

All Hallows' School opened on 1 November 1861 by the Sisters of Mercy in the Dean's Cottage beside the Catholic Cathedral (now Old St Stephen's Church) in Adelaide Street in the Brisbane town centre. It was the first secondary school for girls in Queensland. Needing more space to accommodate a growing school they moved on 1 November 1863 to the house Adderton on Duncan's Hill in Fortitude Valley.

In 1862 the Jireh Baptist Church opened in Fortitude Valley.

A Primitive Methodist church opened at 483 Brunswick Street on Sunday 15 October 1876.

A post office was established in 1887.

St Patrick's Catholic Church was built in Wickham Street by Father James Hanly, uphill from the Prince Consort Hotel. St Patrick's Convent School was established later at the Wickham Street site. Both were wooden structures. In 1882, the congregation moved to a new (and still current) St Patrick's Church in Morgan Street. On 5 December 1887, Cardinal Moran laid the foundation stone for a new school building in Ivory Street opening onto Hope Street at the rear. The new school opened in January 1889. In 1952 Brisbane City Council announced that it would be undertaking work in Ivory Street as part of a solution to eliminate traffic bottlenecks and St Patrick's School was one of the affected properties. In 1955 the school buildings were relocated to the church grounds in Morgan Street. The school closed on 19 November 1982.

1891 saw the railway line extended from the Brisbane central business district (the area around Queen Street) into Fortitude Valley, and Thomas Beirne opened a business on Brunswick Street. His business thrived and, after extension, he travelled to England in 1896, leaving his manager of two years, James McWhirter, in charge. Soon after his return, McWhirter established a competing drapery business opposite Beirne's in 1898. Beirne and McWhirter became keen rivals and are credited with establishing the Valley as a hub of commerce from the late 1890s.

In the late 19th century, commercial activities in Brisbane were divided along religious lines, with Protestant shopkeepers setting up along Queen and Adelaide streets in the central business district, and shops operated by Roman Catholics in Stanley Street, South Brisbane. However, in the 1893 Brisbane flood (and again in 1897), major floods wiped out many shops in South Brisbane, and owners in that area decided to move and set up operations north of the river in an area free of flooding. The area they chose was Fortitude Valley. By that time Brisbane's horse-drawn tram system already centred on Fortitude Valley, making it the logical choice to establish a shopping precinct.

Fortitude Valley was also strongly advocated as the location of a new town hall in what became known as "the battle of the sites". Brisbane Town Council already purchased a piece of land in Fortitude Valley and supporters of the Fortitude Valley site pointed out that it would allow stronger foundations compared to the swampy site proposed at Adelaide Street in the existing commercial district. However, a petition was raised in support of the Adelaide Street site and with the support of Charles Moffatt Jenkinson, the mayor of Brisbane in 1914, it was chosen over the Fortitude Valley site. Jenkinson committed the council to that decision by selling the site in Fortitude Valley to the Catholic Church for the construction of the Holy Name Cathedral (a project that, although commenced, made little progress and was eventually abandoned).

From the early 1900s through to the 1960s, the thriving shopping precinct was dominated by McWhirters, Beirne's and, later, Overells' department stores. The Overells Building was completed in 1907. They were ultimately bought out by the Myer, David Jones and Waltons chains respectively with Overells being bought by Walton in 1956. Woolworths and Coles supermarkets and a host of smaller shops also flourished in the precinct during this period. Owing to its proximity to the central business district and the close concentration of public transport in the area, the Valley became the largest non-CBD shopping precinct in Australia through the 1950s and 1960s.

Between 1923 and 1948 mixed gender opportunity classes for the intellectually impaired and handicapped were conducted at the boys' school. In 1951 the Fortitude Valley Opportunity School was approved and operated as a separate entity in its own right shortly afterwards. The school closed in 1961.

The rise of suburban shopping centres and the closure of the tram network in 1969 sounded the death knell for Fortitude Valley, with a gradual decrease in customers. David Jones closed its Valley store in the 1970s and Myer closed its doors in the early 1990s.

In 2010, the Music Industry College opened at 458 Wickham Street with 27 students. In 2014 the college relocated to its own premises at 38 Berwick Street.

In 2017, the Angelorum College opened at 377 St Pauls Terrace as an independent Catholic school, established by families who had previously been home schooling their children.

In 2020, the Fortitude Valley State Secondary College opened on the site of the former Fortitude Valley State School. It had an initial intake of 137 students in Year 7. By 2025, it will be providing a full secondary school program from Years 7 to 12. It is expected to grow to 1,500 students. This is the first ever government secondary school in Fortitude Valley; previously, the nearest was Kelvin Grove State College.

== Demographics ==
Historical population
Year	Pop.	±%
2001	3,456	—
2006	5,082	+47.0%
2011	5,615	+10.5%
2016	6,978	+24.3%
2021	9,708	+39.1%

In the 2016 census, Fortitude Valley had a population of 6,978 people, 54.0% were male and 46.0% were female. The median age of the Fortitude Valley population was 31 years, 7 years below the Australian median. Children aged under 15 years made up 4.3% of the population and people aged 65 years and over made up 4.7% of the population. 46.1% of people living in Fortitude Valley were born in Australia, compared to the national average of 66.7; the next most common countries of birth were India 4.4%, New Zealand 4.2%, England 3.2%, Brazil 2.4% and Colombia 2.2%. 65.1% of people spoke only English at home; the next most popular languages were Spanish 3.5%, Mandarin 2.7%, Portuguese 2.3%, Hindi 1.8% and Korean 1.8%. The most common responses for religion were No Religion 40.8% and Catholic 18.0%.

In the 2021 census, Fortitude Valley had a population of 9,708 people.

== Heritage listings ==
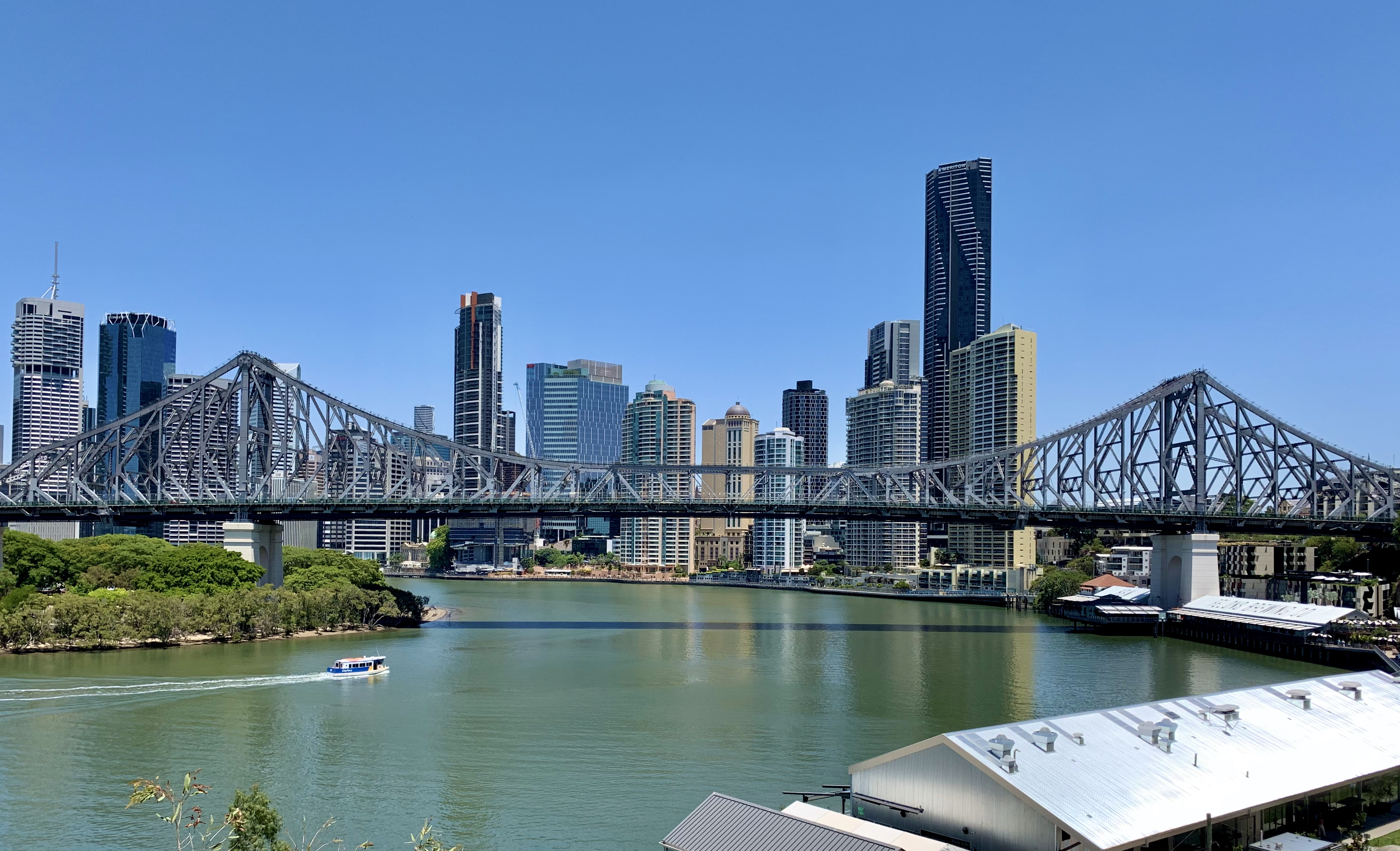
Story Bridge

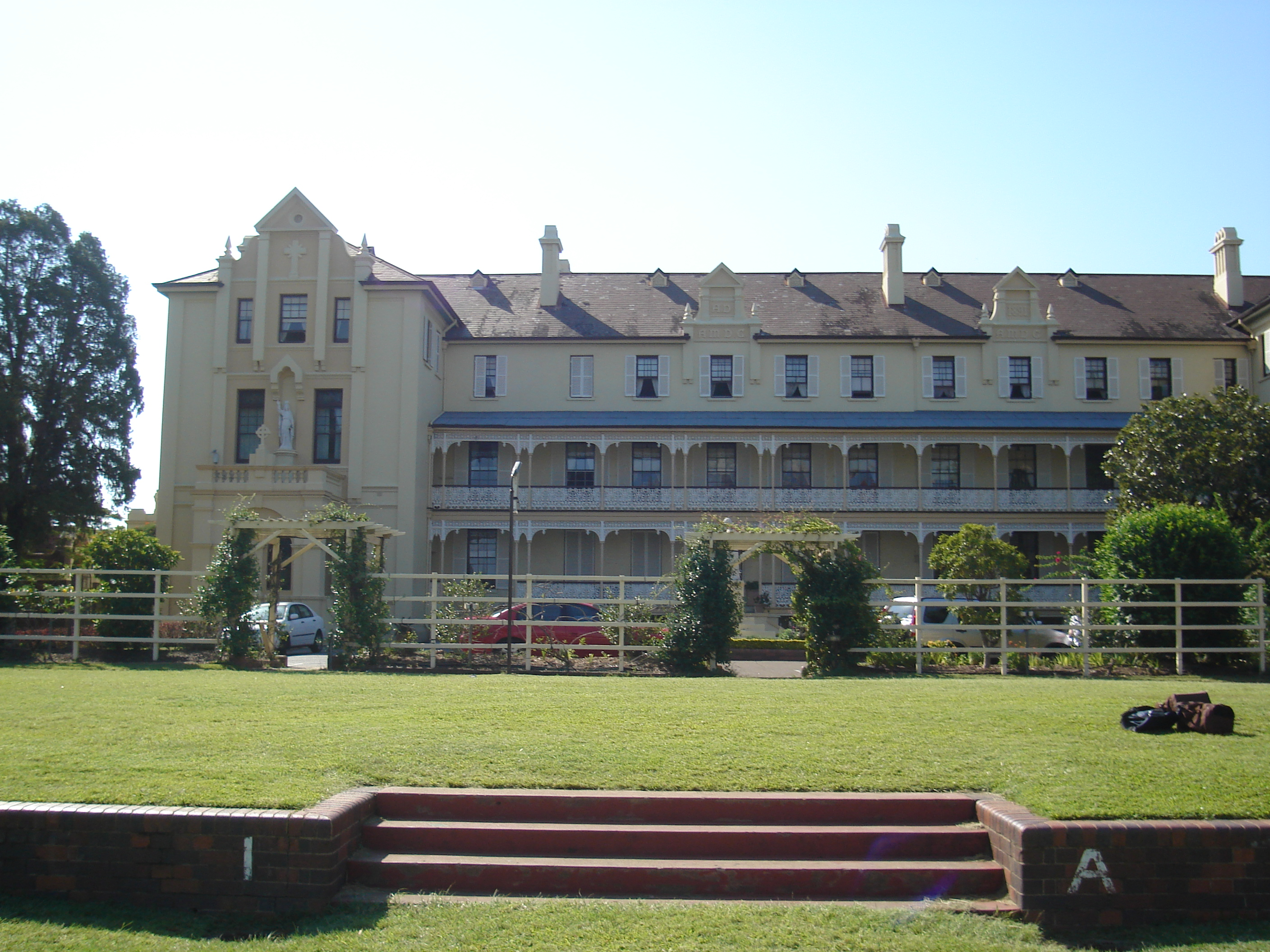
All Hallows' School

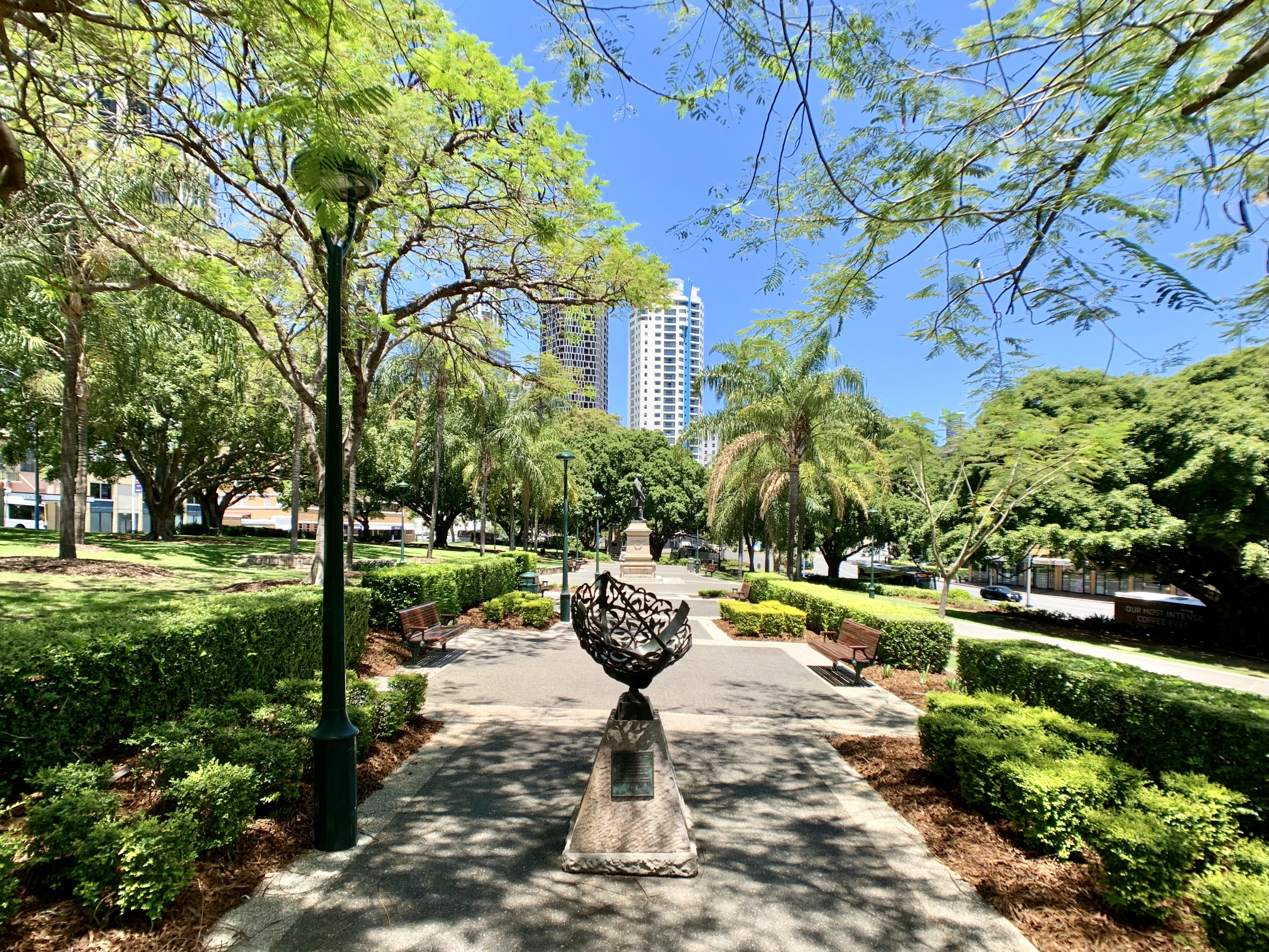
Centenary Place

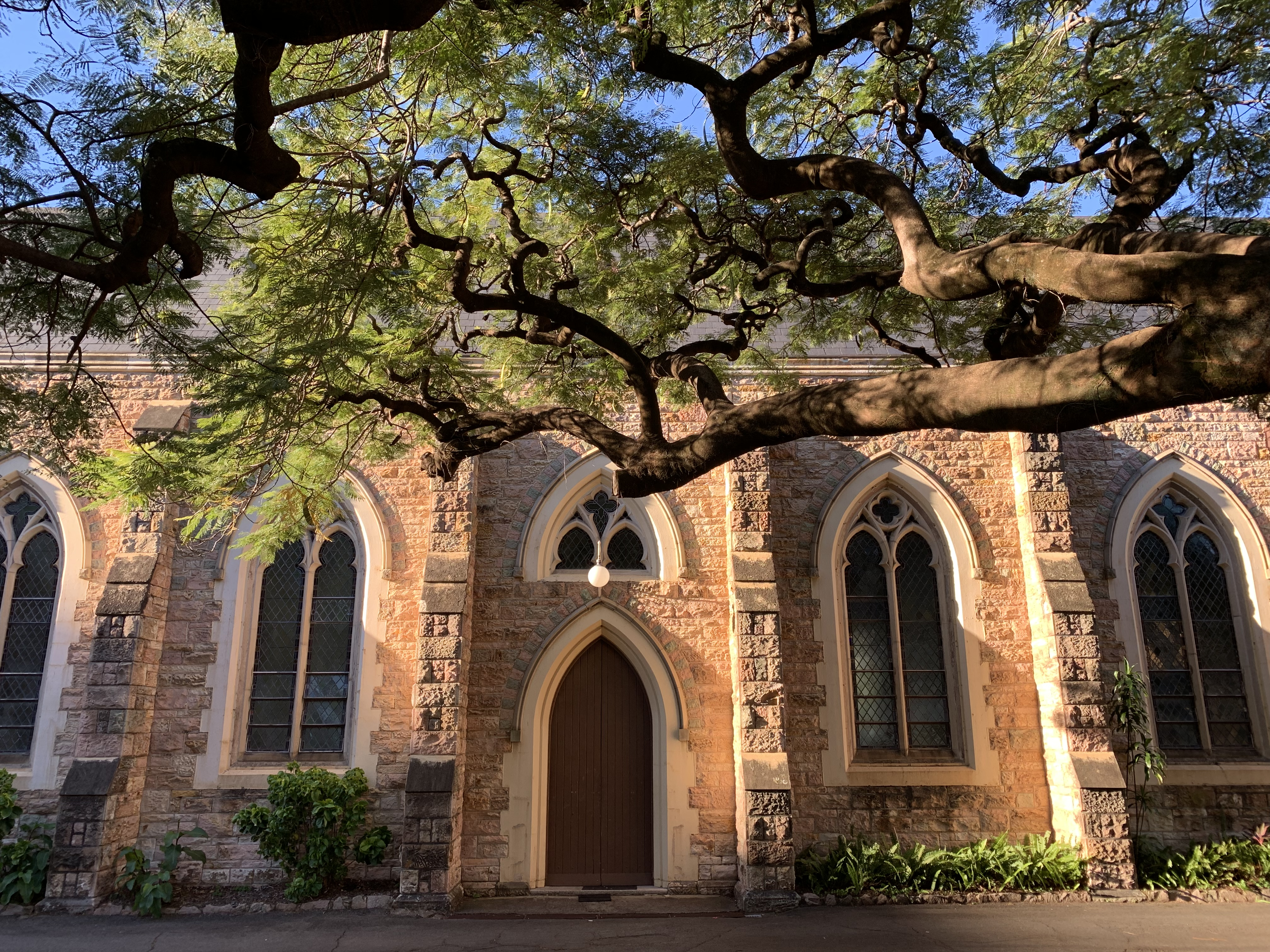
St Patrick's Church

Fortitude Valley has a number of heritage-listed sites, including:

- Fortitude Valley Child Health Centre, 112 Alfred Street
- Queensland Brewery Company Building, 501 Ann Street
- All Hallows' School Buildings, 547 Ann Street
- former Fortitude Valley Post Office, 740 Ann Street
- Doggetts Cottage, 33 Arthur Street
- Howard Smith Wharves, Boundary Street
- Austral Motors Building, 95 Boundary Street
- Story Bridge, Bradfield Highway
- Fortitude Valley State School including the former Fortitude Valley Infants' School and former Fortitude Valley Boys' School, 95 & 99 Brookes Street
- Fortitude Valley Methodist Church, 116–120 Brookes Street
- Fortitude Valley Police Station, 119 Brookes Street
- Holy Trinity Church, 141 Brookes Street
- Holy Trinity Parish Hall, 141 Brookes Street
- Holy Trinity Rectory, 141 Brookes Street
- Royal George Hotel and Ruddle's Building, 323–335 Brunswick Street
- Empire Hotel, 339 Brunswick Street
- former Corbett and Son Store, 446–452 Brunswick Street
- Fortitude Valley Primitive Methodist Church, 483 Brunswick Street
- La Scala, 517 Brunswick Street
- TC Beirne Department Store, 28 Duncan Street
- Fortitude Valley Air Raid Shelters, East Street and Wickham Street (27.4546°S 153.0371°E)
- Holy Name Cathedral Site, Gipps Street
- Bulolo Flats, 9 McLachlan Street
- St Patricks Church, 58 Morgan Street
- Villa Maria Hostel, 167–173 St Paul's Terrace
- Jubilee Hotel, 464–468 St Paul's Terrace
- Drill Shed, 342 Water Street
- McWhirters, Wickham Street
- Centenary Place, 85 Wickham Street
- Prince Consort Hotel, 230 Wickham Street
- Wickham Hotel, 308 Wickham Street
- West's Furniture Showroom, 620 Wickham Street

== Entertainment district ==
=== Chinatown ===
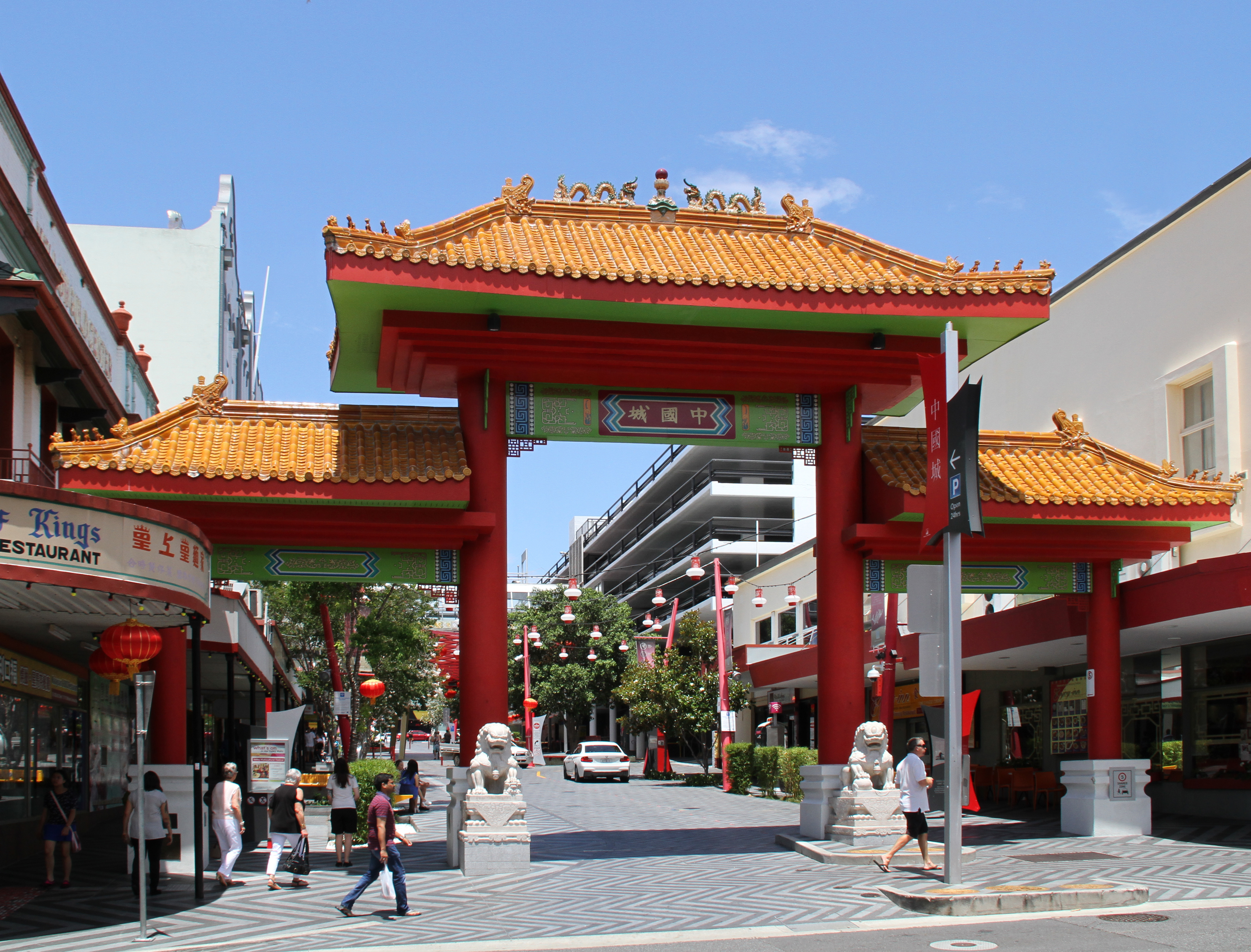
Chinatown Mall

The Chinatown Mall is a pedestrian street which occupies all of Duncan Street opened in 1987 as the first step to the revitalisation of Fortitudes Valley's entertainment district. The Mall runs parallel to Brunswick Street Mall, and connects Wickham Street and Ann Street.

The 1990s saw the development of Fortitude Valley into a thriving live music scene and nightclub district. In 1991, the Brunswick Street pedestrian shopping mall was established. Thereafter, the Brisbane City Council led a concerted urban renewal campaign, encouraging high density residential development around the suburb.

In 2012, around 50,000 people head to Fortitude Valley's clubs, pubs and restaurants each weekend night with many coming to enjoy a succulent Chinese meal. Around 30 venues are licensed to trade until 3:00 am.

=== Valley Music Harmony Plan ===
In 1999, residents' complaints about neighbouring clubs' live music threatened the closure of the Empire Hotel and the Press Club, two established venues. Musicians and their fans revolted through the "Save the Music" campaign and, 20,000 signatures later, petitioned Brisbane City Council and the Queensland Government to address the emerging problem. The Brisbane City Council commenced the development of a Valley Music Harmony Plan in July 2002. The aim of the Valley Music Harmony Plan is to manage the impacts of music noise on residents and businesses without compromising the viability of the entertainment industry in Fortitude Valley.

That resulted in 2005 in Fortitude Valley becoming Australia's first "Special Entertainment Precinct", designed to protect both live music and new residents through planning restrictions. The Special Entertainment Precinct status exempts entertainment venues within the area from the amplified noise requirements of the Liquor Act 1992, and allows council to manage amplified music noise under the Amplified Music Venues Local Law 2006. But it also requires new residential and accommodation development construction to achieve a minimum noise reduction of 25 decibels in the 63 hertz frequency band.

=== Drink Safe Precinct ===
The Fortitude Valley Drink Safe Precinct was a two-year-long trial starting in December 2010. Trials also took place in Surfers Paradise and Townsville. After one year club owners responded positively to the trial. Statistics released in May 2012 showed arrests, evictions and tickets for liquor infringements have declined.

== Transport ==
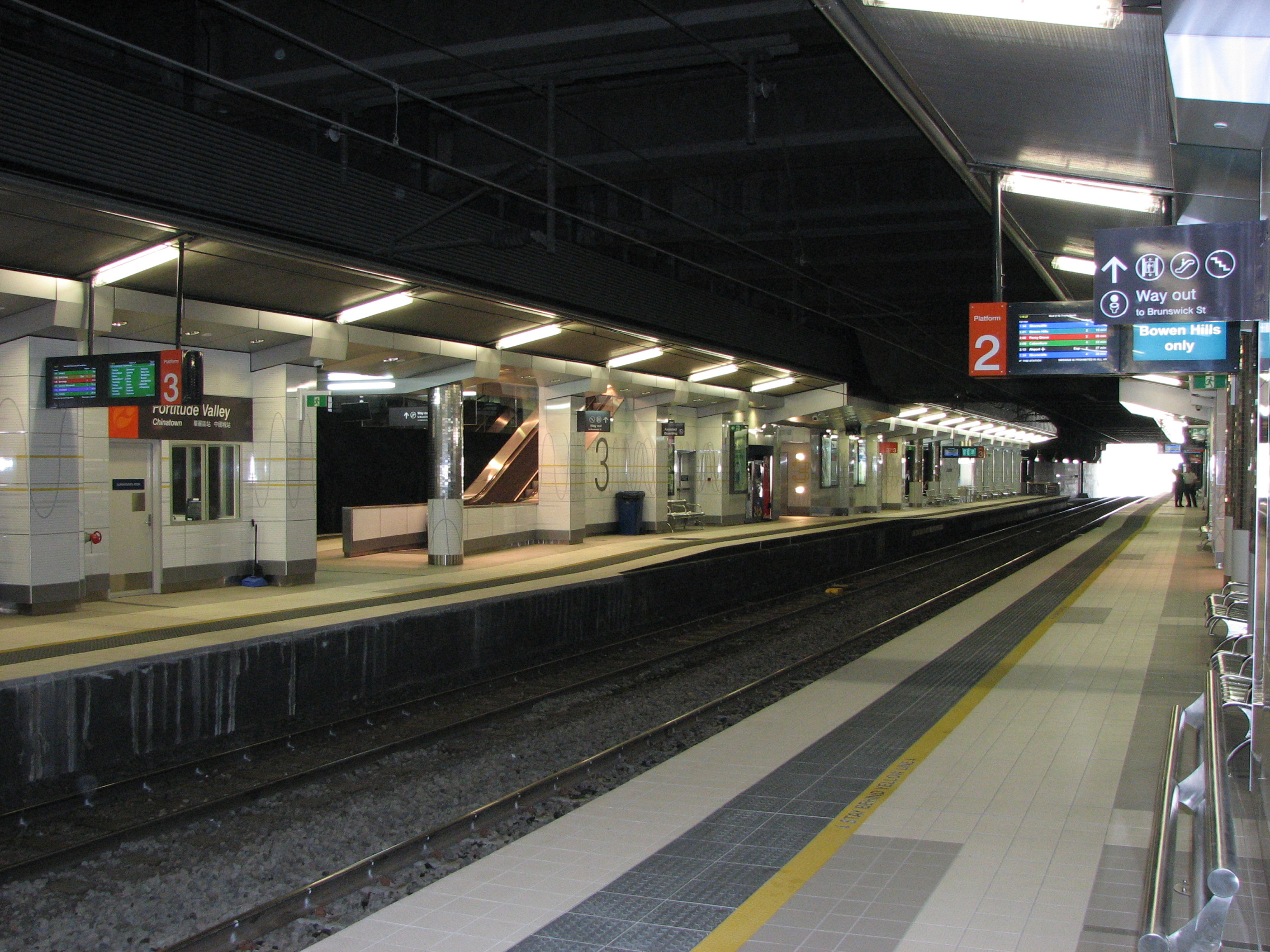
Tracks and platforms at Fortitude Valley railway station

Transport for Brisbane operates buses to, from and through Fortitude Valley. Fortitude Valley railway station serves all suburban and interurban lines, including Airport line service to Brisbane Airport. The station has four platforms and is located in Zone 1 of the Translink integrated public transport system.

=== Taxis ===
Secure taxi ranks to enable patrons to catch a taxi home are set up at various strategic points and enable easy access without the need to hail a cab. Fortitude Valley has five locations with these ranks on Friday and Saturday night. Funding for this free service is provided by the Brisbane City Council, the Queensland State Government and the Taxi Council of Queensland. These secure ranks are staffed by taxi supervisors and security guards to ensure commuters an orderly and safe environment whilst they wait for service. A 'Chaplain' service also operates where some people might be suffering the effects of excess drugs or alcohol and need some care and attention in a safe place rather than on a bench or footpath. The combination of these services have reputedly assisted in reducing the incidents of fights, disputes and arrests especially between the hours of midnight and 5 am on weekends.

=== Speed limits ===
On 24 August 2007, a 40 km/h (25 mph) speed limit was introduced to parts of Wickham Street, Ann Street, McLachlan Street and Warner Street. The speed limit applies between 10 pm and 6 am from Friday to Sunday night. The speed limit was introduced following safety audits of the Fortitude Valley identifying pedestrian-vehicle conflict as a major issue.

== Education ==
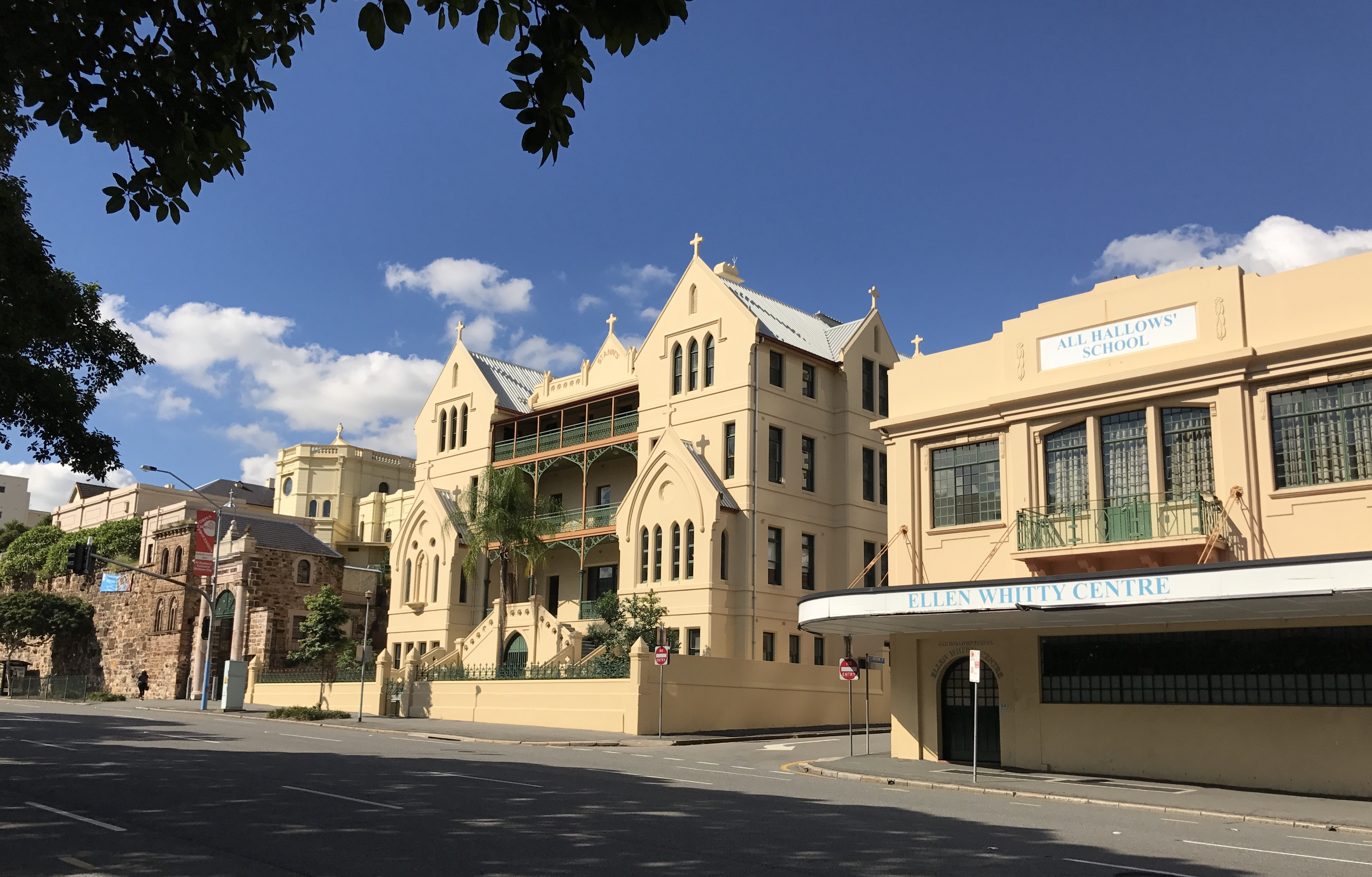
All Hallows' School, 2017

There are no government primary schools in Fortitude Valley. The nearest government primary schools are Brisbane Central State School in neighbouring Spring Hill to the south-west and New Farm State School in neighbouring New Farm to the south-east.

Angelorum College is a private primary and secondary (Prep–9) school for boys and girls at 377 St Pauls Terrace (27.4556°S 153.0327°E). In 2017, the school had an enrolment of 35 students with 4 teachers and 3 non-teaching staff (2 full-time equivalent).

All Hallows' School is a Catholic primary and secondary school (Years 5 to 12) for girls at 547 Ann Street (27.4612°S 153.0326°E). In 2024, the school had an enrolment of 1,702 students with 153 teachers and 120 other staff.

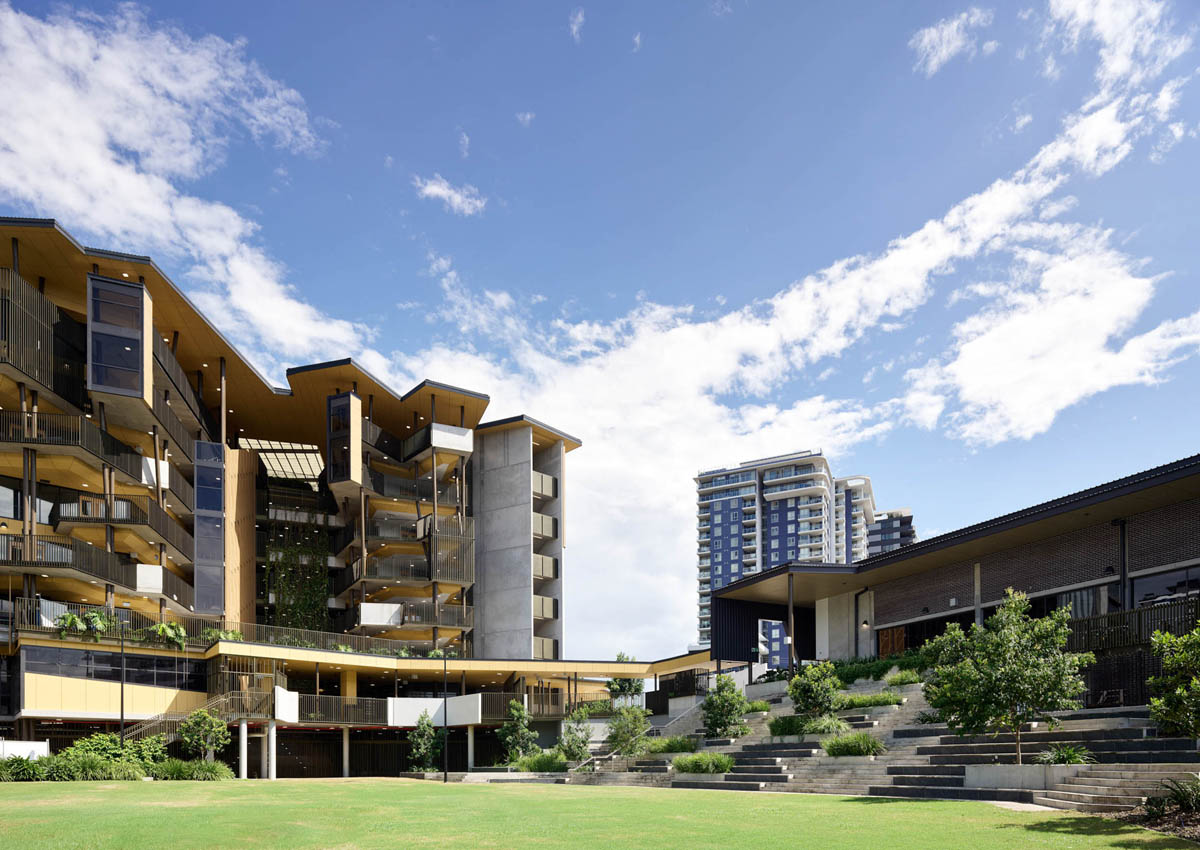
Fortitude Valley State Secondary College, 2025

Fortitude Valley State Secondary College is a government secondary school (Years 7 to 12) for boys and girls at 585 St Pauls Terrace (corner of Brooke Street, 27.45255°S 153.03525°E), the site of the former Fortitude Valley State School. It has a partnership with the Queensland University of Technology (QUT) through which the school students can access QUT's innovative technologies, while QUT education students can gain professional development experience through teaching at the school. In 2024, the school had an enrolment of 695 students in Years 8 to 11 (with Year 12 classes to commence in 2025) with 55 teachers (54 full-time equivalent) and 35 non-teaching staff (27 full-time equivalent).

Music Industry College is a private secondary (Years 11 and 12) school for boys and girls at 38–42 Berwick Street (27.4588°S 153.0369°E). In 2017, the school had an enrolment of 80 students with 7 teachers (5 full-time equivalent) and 6 non-teaching staff (4 full-time equivalent).

Humanitas High School is a private secondary school (Years 7 to 12), run as a democratic community school with full input from parents, teachers and students. It opened in July 2021 and in 2024 had 60 students in Years 7 to 10.

== Local events and culture ==
=== BIGSOUND ===
Bigsound is an annual three-day music conference, industry showcase and festival taking place across the numerous live venues in the suburb's entertainment precinct, usually in the first week of September. The event includes both performances by artists and bands, such as Stand Atlantic and Alex the Astronaut, and speeches by keynote industry specialists or experts.

=== Valley Fiesta ===
The Valley Fiesta is an annual three-day event featuring free live music, market stalls, food and drink from many local restaurants and cafés, and other entertainment. Artists that have performed at the Valley Fiesta include Hilltop Hoods, Downsyde, Katie Noonan, Tim Rogers, Butterfingers, Evermore and The Preatures on the Brunswick Street Mall stage and Nick Skitz and End Of Fashion at surrounding venues.

=== International Jazz Festival ===
The International Jazz Festival replaced the biennial Valley Jazz Festival in 2013. The festival is put on by Jazz Queensland. It is 5 five day festival generally held during the first week of June.

=== Straight Out of Brisbane (SOOB) ===
Straight Out of Brisbane was formed in 2002 by a group of emerging artists who wanted to create new opportunities in Queensland's independent cultural sector. The festival is not-for-profit artist-run event that features workshops, performances, exhibitions, screenings, live music and public art. The festival has been held every year up until 2007.

=== Fortitude Valley Diehards ===
Fortitude Valley Football Club, also simply known as "Valleys", were the oldest surviving rugby league team in Brisbane until their demise in 1995. In 2002, Valleys entered a partnership with another former Brisbane rugby league team, Brothers. Playing under the name Brothers-Valleys until changing their name to Brothers Diehards for the 2004 season. Valley's Juniors are still active members of the QRL South East Division having been based at Emerson Park in Grange since the 1970s.

=== Big Gay Day ===
Big Gay Day is a gay, lesbian, bisexual and transgender pride festival held over one day in and around the Wickham Hotel in Fortitude Valley. The celebration raises money for LGBTQIA+ groups such as GLWA and Open Doors. Previous entertainment has included various local and international DJ's, performers such as Marcia Hines, Melanie C and TV Rock as well as drag shows.

=== Swimming ===
The Commercial Swimming Club trains at the Valley Pool and has produced many Olympic and World Champions.

== In popular culture ==
In October 1991, artist Jack Karlson was arrested at a Fortitude Valley Chinese restaurant for unknown reasons, which was filmed by Chris Reason as part of a news report. Karlson proclaimed during his arrest that the arrest was Democracy Manifest. The video and Karlson became a popular internet meme many years later.

== Attractions ==
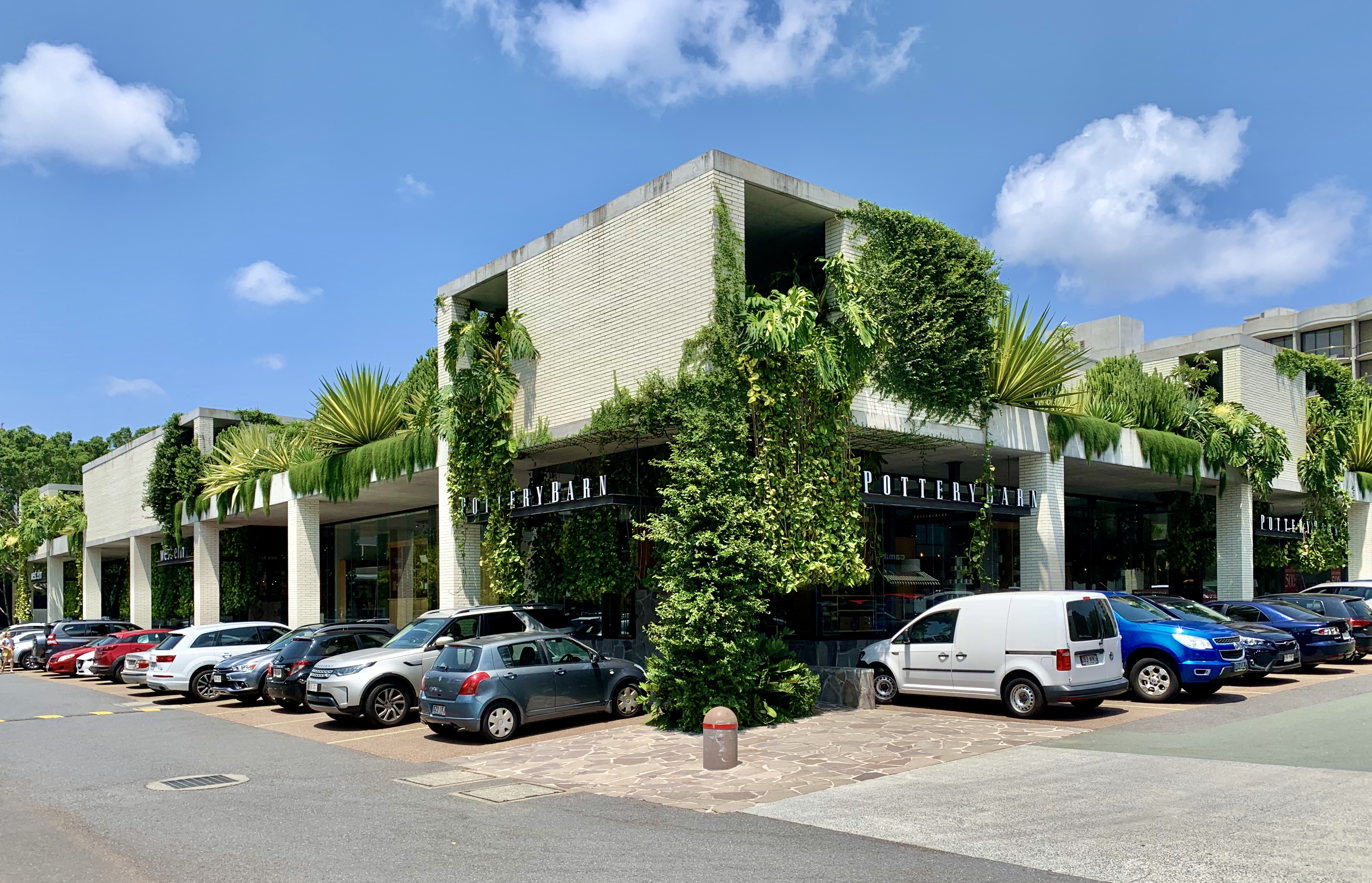
James Street Precinct

The James Street Precinct is a shopping and dining area in James Street. It includes the James Street Palace Cinemas and the Calile Hotel.

== Amenities ==
There are a number of parks, including:

- Bedford Playground Park (27.4574°S 153.0285°E)
- Brunswick Street Park (27.4559°S 153.0319°E)
- Centenary Place Park (27.4609°S 153.0319°E)
- Church Street Park (27.4545°S 153.0369°E)
- Howard Smith Wharf Precinct (27.4626°S 153.0368°E)
- Morse St Park (27.4550°S 153.0401°E)
- Wilson Outlook Reserve (27.4633°S 153.0387°E)

== Notable people ==
- Edward Archibald Douglas (1877–1947)
  - Born on 2 November and attended St. Benedict's College, Fort Augustas
  - Appointed judge of the Industrial Court of Queensland in 1915 by T. J. Ryan's Labor Government
  - Appointed Supreme Court Judge in 1929 until his death in 1947 from a coronary occlusion

== See also ==
- Mana Bar
