= Fortitude Valley Air Raid Shelters =

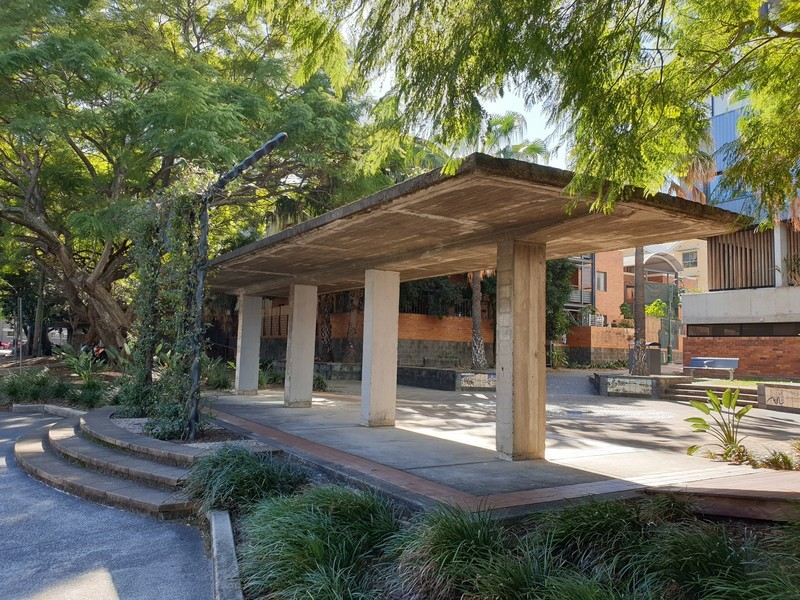
- Southern air raid shelter on East Street, seen from the south, 2020

- Location within Queensland
- 27.4546°S 153.0371°E
- Location: East Street and Wickham Street, Fortitude Valley, City of Brisbane, Queensland, Australia

History
- Design period: 1939-1945 World War II
- Built: 1942

Site notes
- Architectural style: Modernism

Queensland Heritage Register
- Official name: Fortitude Valley Air Raid Shelters
- Type: state heritage
- Designated: 25 September 2020
- Reference no.: 650253
- Type: Defence: Air raid shelter
- Theme: Maintaining order: Defending the country
- Builders: Brisbane City Council

Fortitude Valley Air Raid Shelters is a heritage-listed group of four air raid shelters at East Street and Wickham Street, Fortitude Valley, City of Brisbane, Queensland, Australia. They were built in 1942 by Brisbane City Council. They were added to the Queensland Heritage Register on 25 September 2020.

== History ==
Four air raid shelters stand near the corner of East Street and Wickham Street, in Fortitude Valley, Brisbane, which is part of the traditional land of the Turrbal and Jagera peoples. Each shelter consists of a concrete floor, four central concrete columns, and a flat double-cantilever concrete roof. Constructed by the Brisbane City Council during early 1942, in the midst of World War II (WWII), these structures are among 20 surviving examples of public surface air raid shelters designed for post-war use as either park shelters or bus stops, after the removal of their brick or concrete walls. There are 27 public surface air raid shelters of all types, built by local governments, remaining in Queensland. The shelters in Fortitude Valley, the largest surviving group of public air raid shelters in Queensland, are important in demonstrating the impact of Japan's entry into the war on Queensland's civilian population. They were once arranged around the perimeter of a children's playground established in 1922.

When World War II began In September 1939, the Queensland Premier's Department, as the agency responsible for co-ordinating civil defence works in the state, began implementing home security policies. Air Raid Protection Committees, usually consisting of the local mayor, inspector of police and government medical officer, formed in centres along the Queensland coast.

As the threat of war with Japan increased, construction of public air raid shelters was planned in main centres considered vulnerable to air attack (e.g. the Babinda Air Raid Shelter in Far North Queensland). These home security policies were outlined in the Commonwealth War Book, which was prepared before the outbreak of war and outlined measures to be taken by authorities in wartime.

Australia was under little threat of air attack until late 1941. On 8 December 1941, the United States of America entered the war, following the previous day's bombing of the American fleet at Pearl Harbor by Japanese carrier-borne aircraft. Simultaneously, Japanese forces launched assaults on Thailand, the Philippines and the British colony of Malaya. The sudden fall of Singapore on 15 February 1942 and the rapid Japanese advance through the islands of the Netherlands East Indies (NEI) raised fears of air attacks on Australia. The first Japanese air raid on Darwin occurred on 19 February 1942; and Broome, in Western Australia, was attacked on 3 March 1942. Japanese air raids on other targets in Australia seemed likely, and an invasion of Australia was also feared. Japan briefly considered invading Australia (an idea promoted by the Imperial Japanese Navy, but rejected by the Imperial Japanese Army due to a lack of resources) before shelving that option in March 1942, in favour of isolating Australia from the United States by capturing Port Moresby, and later Fiji, New Caledonia and the Samoan Islands.

As a result of the growing fear of Japanese air raids, the Queensland Premier acted with powers conferred by Regulation 35a, an amendment to the National Security (General) Regulations of the National Security Act 1939–1940, which authorised each state premier to direct "blackouts" and to "make such provision as he deems necessary to protect the persons and property of the civil population". The Queensland Government issued the Protection of Persons and Property Order No. 1, gazetted 23 December 1941, which ordered the Brisbane City Council (BCC), and other local authorities near the coast, to build air raid shelters. The BCC was ordered to construct 200 public surface shelters in the city area. Order No. 1 also required the owners of any building in the coastal areas, where over 30 people would normally be present at any one time (such as hotels), to build shelters within, or adjacent to, the building. Queensland Railways (QR) also instituted a shelter-building program at its railway stations. All Queensland coastal state schools were closed in late January 1942 and, although most reopened on 2 March 1942, student attendance was optional until the war ended. A policy of voluntary evacuation of women and children from Queensland coastal areas was also implemented on 27 January 1942.

Order No. 1 was applied state-wide, and another 24 local authorities in Queensland's coastal areas were ordered to produce surface or trench shelters for the public, to be built according to the Air Raid Shelter Code laid down in the Second Schedule of Order No. 1. Initially, 19 of these local authorities were expected to construct a total of 133 surface shelters able to withstand the blast of a 500-pound bomb bursting 50 feet away. A surface shelter was a self-contained external structure with the floor surface at or above ground level. Five local authorities were ordered to dig trenches. Standard designs for brick and concrete surface shelters, and for trench shelters, were sent to local authorities by the Architectural Branch of the Queensland Department of Public Works (DPW). These surface shelters were only meant to protect people, caught by surprise out in the open, from blast and debris, but not a direct hit.

The number of shelters to be built, and the number of local authorities required to build them, was increased in January 1942. By 26 January, 26 local authorities outside Brisbane were expected to build 143 surface air raid shelters, with Tully and Redcliffe constructing trenches and Ipswich building a combination of surface shelters and trenches. Ultimately, those local authorities outside Brisbane which had work funded by the DPW, built 133 shelters - 126 surface shelters, and seven underground. The underground shelters were at Bundaberg and Mount Morgan. In five cases (Atherton, Cairns, Gladstone, Mackay, and Toowoomba) the DPW built shelters without local authority assistance. Some local authorities, like Brisbane, undertook and funded their own shelter building program. The Brisbane City Council spent £88,933. The DPW's construction program outside Brisbane cost £56,596 with£30,929 worth of the work was undertaken by the DPW, and the rest by local authorities with funds provided by the DPW.

Brisbane was a prime target with a large civilian population. After the first US forces arrived in Brisbane in the Pensacola Convoy on 22 December 1941, the city became a major supply base and staging point for the war in the South West Pacific, and the largest US naval base in continental Australia. Brisbane was the location of various units' headquarters, plus supply and ordnance depots, military transit camps and hospitals, research facilities, naval bases (including a US submarine base), munitions factories, military airfields, and aircraft assembly and maintenance facilities. In January 1942 Brisbane became Base Section 3 of the United States Army Forces in Australia (USAFIA), headquartered in Somerville House, South Brisbane. After General Douglas MacArthur, Supreme Commander, South West Pacific Area (SWPA), arrived in Brisbane in July 1942, the city also hosted his General Headquarters in the AMP building at the corner of Queen and Edward Streets (now known as MacArthur Chambers). General Sir Thomas Blamey, Commander Allied Land Forces, had his Advanced Land Headquarters at the University of Queensland, St Lucia. Queensland played a major role in the build-up of troops and supplies for the joint US-Australian counter-offensive in New Guinea, which occurred after the Japanese advance was checked at Milne Bay and on the Kokoda track (August–September 1942).

The BCC took responsibility for certain Air Raid Precautions (ARP) activities in Brisbane, including establishing a control headquarters for Essential and Emergency Services, known as BESOR, which communicated with the police ARP control centre in the basement of the Roma Street Police Station, on the corner of Roma Street and Ann Street. The latter controlled the ARP wardens. The BCC managed rescue and demolition; installed and maintained the electrically-operated air raid sirens (operated by the police); equipped first aid sheds; and constructed public air raid shelters while supervising the building of private air raid shelters. Above-ground salt water pipes were also laid along city streets to aid in firefighting.

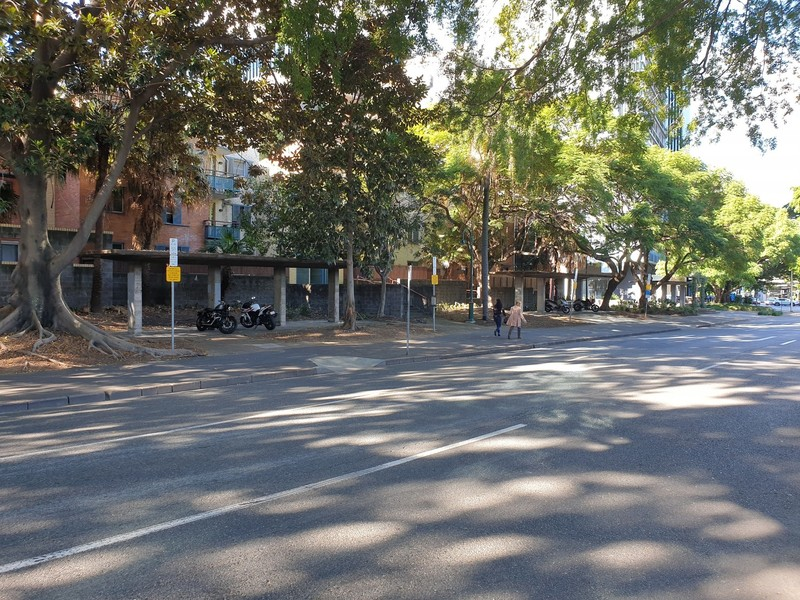
The three East Street shelters, ween from the WNW, 2020

The BCC constructed 235 surface air raid shelters, with seating, temporary lighting, and lavatory accommodation; the building programme being 90% complete by June 1942. In addition, 9,950 feet (3.03 km) of trenches were constructed in public parks, including 8,400 feet (2.6 km) of slit trenches; plus covered trenches (either concrete-lined or formed with large reinforced concrete pipes) in the Botanic Gardens (8,400 feet (2.6 km)) and Victoria Park (500 feet (150 m)). In addition to the public shelters, the BCC also constructed shelters for leased wharves and council properties, including at the Stanley Wharf, Circular Quay Wharves 2, 3 and 4, Norman Wharf, and Musgrave Wharf. Shelters were built on Cairns Street and under the Story Bridge (between Rotherham and Baildon Streets), for Kangaroo Point shipbuilding workers, and five shelters (including three pillboxes and two concrete pipe shelters) were constructed on behalf of the Bridge Board, Bureau of Industry, at the Howard Smith Wharves. Although the BCC 1941–42 annual report claimed the surface shelters would each accommodate 50 people, the Department of Works list of shelters indicates 70 persons per standard pillbox or reusable shelter, with varying numbers for "special" pillbox shelters. Slit trenches were dug in Newstead Park, Mowbray Park, New Farm Park, Albert Park, Hardgrave Park, Lang Park, Highgate Hill Park, Musgrave Park, Hefferan Park, Davies Park, and Gregory Terrace Park.

By mid-1942, of the BCC's 235 public surface shelters, 177 were listed as "pillbox" (which included 21 "special", or site specific, pillboxes); plus 14 were listed as "bus stop", and 44 as "park shelter". The latter two designs were intended to be reused for other purposes after the war, through the removal of either three walls (bus stop), or four walls (park shelter), and leaving the concrete slab roof, floor slab and support columns or piers.

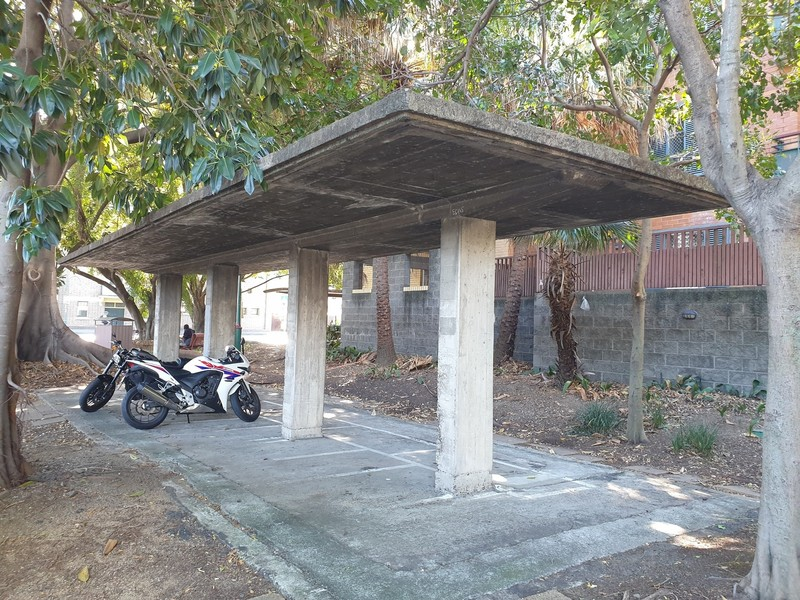
Northern air raid shelter on East Street, seen from the south, 2020

The designer of the reusable air raid shelters was Frank Gibson Costello (1903–87), who was a head teacher in architectural design and lecturer in town planning at Sydney Technical College, prior to his role as the BCC's City Architect between 1941 and 1952. His variants of the standard pillbox were designed to provide a post-war utility for at least part of the Council's shelter building programme. Costello later worked for the Queensland Department of Public Works, 1958–69, while also teaching at the Central Technical College (later the Queensland Institute of Technology) from 1959 to 1975.

In an address delivered to the Constitutional Club in Brisbane 26 February 1942, Costello noted that if "the emergency for their use does not arise ... (unused shelters) ... are still there in brick and concrete, in many cases having no further value and being a possible source of nuisance". He added that "I can assure you that wherever it is possible, without sacrificing the primary requirements of shelter from air attack, I have endeavoured in our Council buildings to so plan the shelters that they will fit into schemes of improvement which we hope will proceed immediately after the war".

Costello's work was characterised by the use of an architectural language inspired by the modern movement in architecture. This movement pursued the rational use of modern materials and principles of functionalist planning and established a visual aesthetic largely inspired by the machine. It was part of an architecture employing the language of vertical and horizontal volumes and planes, floating flat roofs, masses set against voids and monumentality. Though modest in scale and form, the design of the shelters is characteristic of work in this idiom. The reusable shelters were often sited under fig trees, to aid in camouflage, but there were only palm trees near the shelters at the corner of East Street and Wickham Street during WWII.

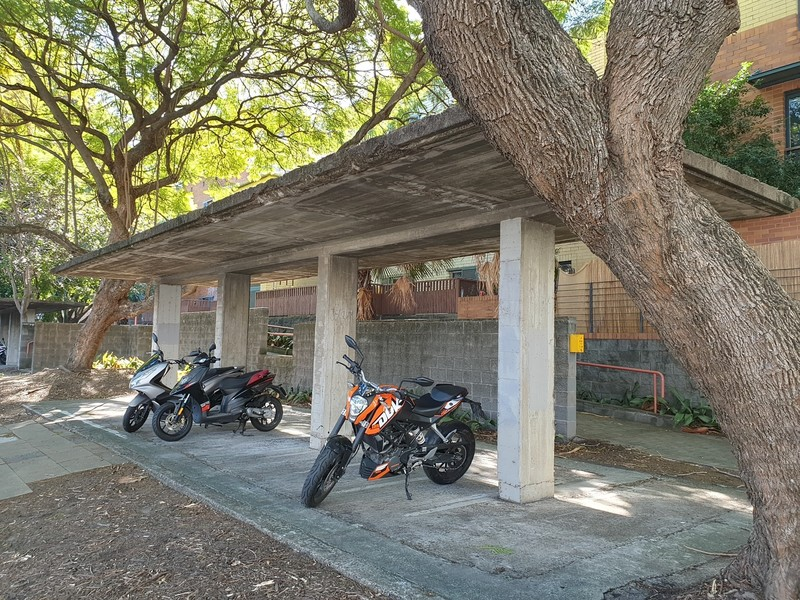
Central air raid shelter on East Street, seen from the south, 2020

The first of Costello's reusable designs was a shelter with double-cantilevered roof slab - called a park shelter. In a BCC Department of Works list (undated) of the shelters constructed by the BCC, these were labelled as "cantilever". They had four central columns supporting the roof slab, which allowed for the removal of the four blast walls after the war. There was also an entrance at each end of the shelter, where an internal wall formed an entry passage - on alternate sides of the shelter. If the walls were made of concrete, the shelter's dimensions were 40 feet (12 m) long, 12 feet 6 inches (3.81 m) wide and 8 feet 6 inches (2.59 m) high, while if the walls were made of brick, the dimensions were 40 feet 9 inches (12.42 m) long by 13 feet 3 inches (4.04 m) wide, by 8 feet 6 inches (2.59 m) high. The difference was due to the fact that, while the concrete walls finished at the soffit (underside of the roof) of the roof slab, flush with the fascia (edge of the roof), the brick walls finished in line with the top of the roof slab, while covering the fascia. The Second Schedule of Order No. 1 had set a minimum wall thickness for air raid shelters of 18 inches (460 mm) for stone, 13.5 inches (340 mm) for brick, with 12 inches (300 mm) for concrete. The roof slab was intended to have at least 4 inches (100 mm) of concrete. Later Queensland Government plans for standard pillbox shelters (non-reusable design) indicated either a 6 inches (150 mm) roof, or alternatively 12 inches (300 mm), where building debris could fall on the shelter

Costello's second reusable design was a bus stop shelter, with a single-cantilevered roof slab. These were designed so that three walls (brick or concrete) could be removed after the war, leaving a back wall and five brick piers at the front. Again, there were entrances at each end. A third design, a variant of the second, was built with a stone rear wall, three removable brick walls and six stone piers at the front. Only two of the latter appear to have been built - referred to in the BCC Department of Works list as "bus (stone)". One was at the Windsor Town Hall in Lutwyche Road, but is no longer extant. A 1950 photograph also shows a tram shelter/former air raid shelter on Wickham Street, which uses stone piers.

Numerous air raid shelters were built in Fortitude Valley, including five near the corner of Wickham Street and East Street. The latter group included one pillbox shelter (southeast of the other four, at a right angle to East Street), and four park shelters, each designed to hold 70 people, and all with concrete walls. These five shelters were completed by mid-1942. They were built around the perimeter of a children's playground, established by the BCC in 1922, and managed by the Queensland Playground Association (formed 1913). The Queensland Playground Association also managed other parks in working class suburbs of inner Brisbane, including the Neal Macrossan Playground in Paddington (1918) and the Bedford Playground in Spring Hill (1927). The five shelters are visible in aerial photographs. At this time, there was also a large temporary building, probably military, in the park.

Shelters were also built in Fortitude Valley on Marshall Street, Yeovil Street, Duncan Street, Warner Street, Gipps Street, McLachlan Street, Alfred Street, Ann Street and Amelia Street.

These public air raid shelters were never needed, as no Japanese air raids were conducted on Brisbane. Those parts of Queensland which were bombed by the Japanese included Horn Island in the Torres Strait (multiple raids between March 1942-June 1943), Townsville (three raids, July 1942) and Miallo, north of Mossman (31 July 1942).

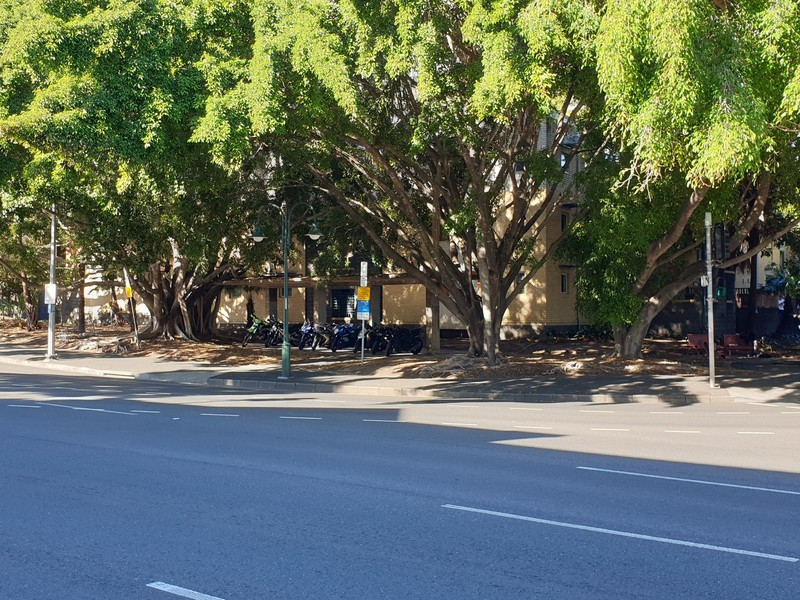
Wickham Street air raid shelter, seen from the west, 2020

Most of the Brisbane structures built for the war were removed at the end of WWII. The saltwater mains, slit trenches, and sirens disappeared, as did the many standard pillboxes that had stood in the middle of the streets of the Brisbane central business district. Of the 235 public surface air raid shelters built by the BCC, 21 survive in 2020 and are still owned by the BCC: one, a special pillbox (of 21 built), survives on Queens Wharf Road, while 20 are Costello's reusable shelters (of the 58 built). The removal of their blast walls, as planned, gave them a renewed purpose. Of the 156 standard pillboxes built, none survive in BCC ownership. A "bus" style shelter with its concrete walls survives in Ferguson Street, Manly, opposite the Manly war memorial, but it is not owned by the BCC, and has had a timber building constructed on top. The worker's shelters at the Story Bridge Hotel and Howard Smith Wharves also still exist.

Of the 20 surviving reusable public surface air raid shelters, 17 are of the park shelter design. Most of the surviving park shelters had concrete blast walls, while only a couple used brick. As well as the four park shelters in Fortitude Valley, there is one at Hefferan Park in Annerley, two at Albert Park, two at Wickham Park, two in Raymond Park in Kangaroo Point, and one in Buranda Playground in Woolloongabba, and one each in small parks or road reserves in Kelvin Grove, Morningside, Nundah, Stones Corner, and Windsor. Most are used as simple park shelters, as intended, but the shelter at Nundah has been modified as a toilet block, and the park shelter at Kelvin Grove is used as a bus shelter (as distinct from those shelters of the "bus stop" design). Two examples of the bus stop design survive, at Newmarket and Newstead; plus one example of the bus (stone) variant survives on Turbot Street, at King Edward Park.

The walls of the four park shelters at the corner of Wickham and East streets were removed according to plan after WWII, while the nearby pillbox shelter was demolished. A BCC carpark was built on the playground site in 1959, and later photographs show cars parked under the former air raid shelters. The northwest half of the carpark was redeveloped in the 1990s, and in 2020 three of the shelters are used as cover for parked motorcycles and scooters. All the shelters are in a narrow park, and are surrounded by later gardens or paving. The mature trees near the shelters, apart from a palm tree between the central and northern shelters on East Street, post-date 1981.

== Description ==
The Fortitude Valley Air Raid Shelters (the shelters) are four rectangular, reinforced concrete structures in Fortitude Valley, Brisbane. Three shelters are located on the northeast side of East Street, between Ann Street and Wickham Street; while one is around the corner on the southeast side of Wickham Street. In 2020 the three northernmost shelters are used as cover for parked motorcycles and scooters. They are surrounded by park landscaping, paving, and other park infrastructure and mature trees (not of heritage significance).

=== The shelters (1942) ===
Each shelter comprises a floor slab, and a double-cantilevered roof slab supported by four concrete columns, orientated with their long sides parallel to the street. The roof slabs are about 12.2m long, and 3.8m wide, while the floor slabs are about 4.5m wide, and project beyond the roof slabs. The four central columns of each shelter are about 270mm by 465mm. The former location of removed walls, including the internal walls which formed entrance passages at either end of the shelters, on alternate sides, are noticeable on the floor slabs; and are often covered in a later cement render, or are indicated in brick payers (Southern Shelter, East Street only). The underside of the soffit is stepped twice near the fascia on each side of each roof slab. There are also lighter markings on the underside of each roof slab, providing evidence of the entrance wall locations; plus indications of either former cable routes to interior lighting fixtures, or interior partitions.

== Heritage listing ==
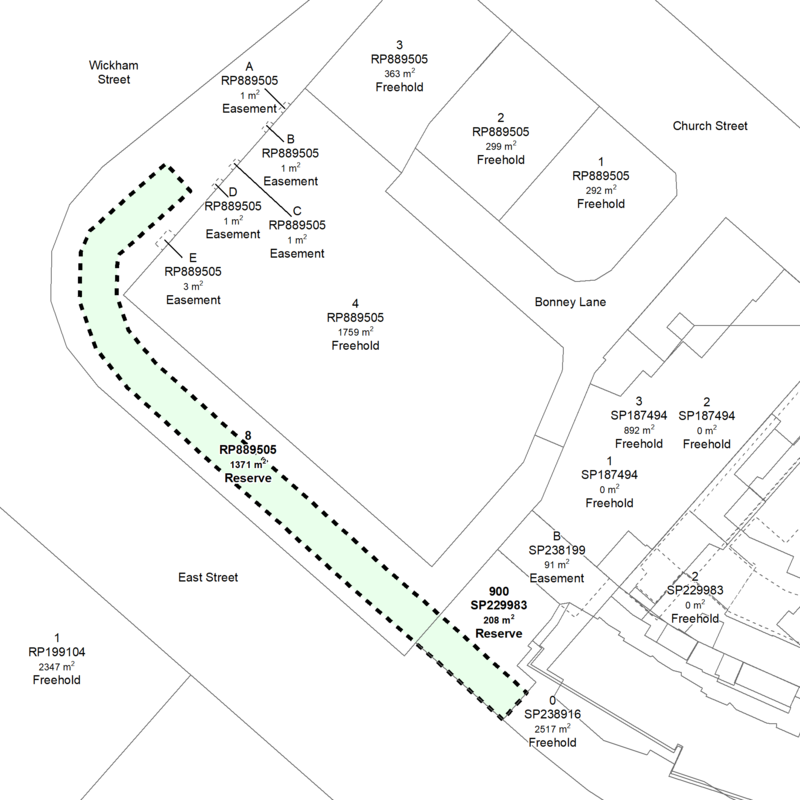
Map of the air raid shelter area, 2020

Fortitude Valley Air Raid Shelters was listed on the Queensland Heritage Register on 25 September 2020 having satisfied the following criteria.

The place is important in demonstrating the evolution or pattern of Queensland's history.

The Fortitude Valley Air Raid Shelters, designed and constructed by the Brisbane City Council in early 1942, are important in demonstrating the impact of Japan's entry into World War II (WWII) on Queensland's civilian population, and the urgent Air Raid Precaution (ARP) measures undertaken in Brisbane during 1941–42. They are a product of the Protection of Persons and Property Order No. 1, gazetted in December 1941, which ordered Queensland's local authorities to construct public air raid shelters.

The place demonstrates rare, uncommon or endangered aspects of Queensland's cultural heritage.

Although hundreds of public and private air raid shelters were constructed during WWII in Queensland, they are now rare. In 2020, 27 public surface air raid shelters constructed by Queensland local governments are known to exist.

The place is important in demonstrating the principal characteristics of a particular class of cultural places.

The Fortitude Valley Air Raid Shelters are important in demonstrating the principal characteristics of the reusable "park shelter" public surface air raid shelters built during WWII by the Brisbane City Council. Characteristics of this design include its: siting in an area with a large concentration of civilians, solid construction and dimensions, reinforced concrete floor, four central concrete columns, and a flat rectangular concrete roof.

The place is important in demonstrating a high degree of creative or technical achievement at a particular period.

The Fortitude Valley Air Raid Shelters are durable examples of innovative design and use of concrete technology during WWII. The shelters demonstrate the secondary uses that were a key part of the original design intent.

The place has a special association with the life or work of a particular person, group or organisation of importance in Queensland's history.

The Fortitude Valley Air Raid Shelters, the largest surviving group of public air raid shelters in Queensland, are important as examples of the wartime work of the City Architect's Office, which over time has made a substantial contribution to the built environment of Brisbane, and particularly the work of Frank Gibson Costello (1903–87), City Architect between 1941 and 1952.
