= Fortitude Valley Post Office =

Heritage-listed post office in Brisbane, Queensland

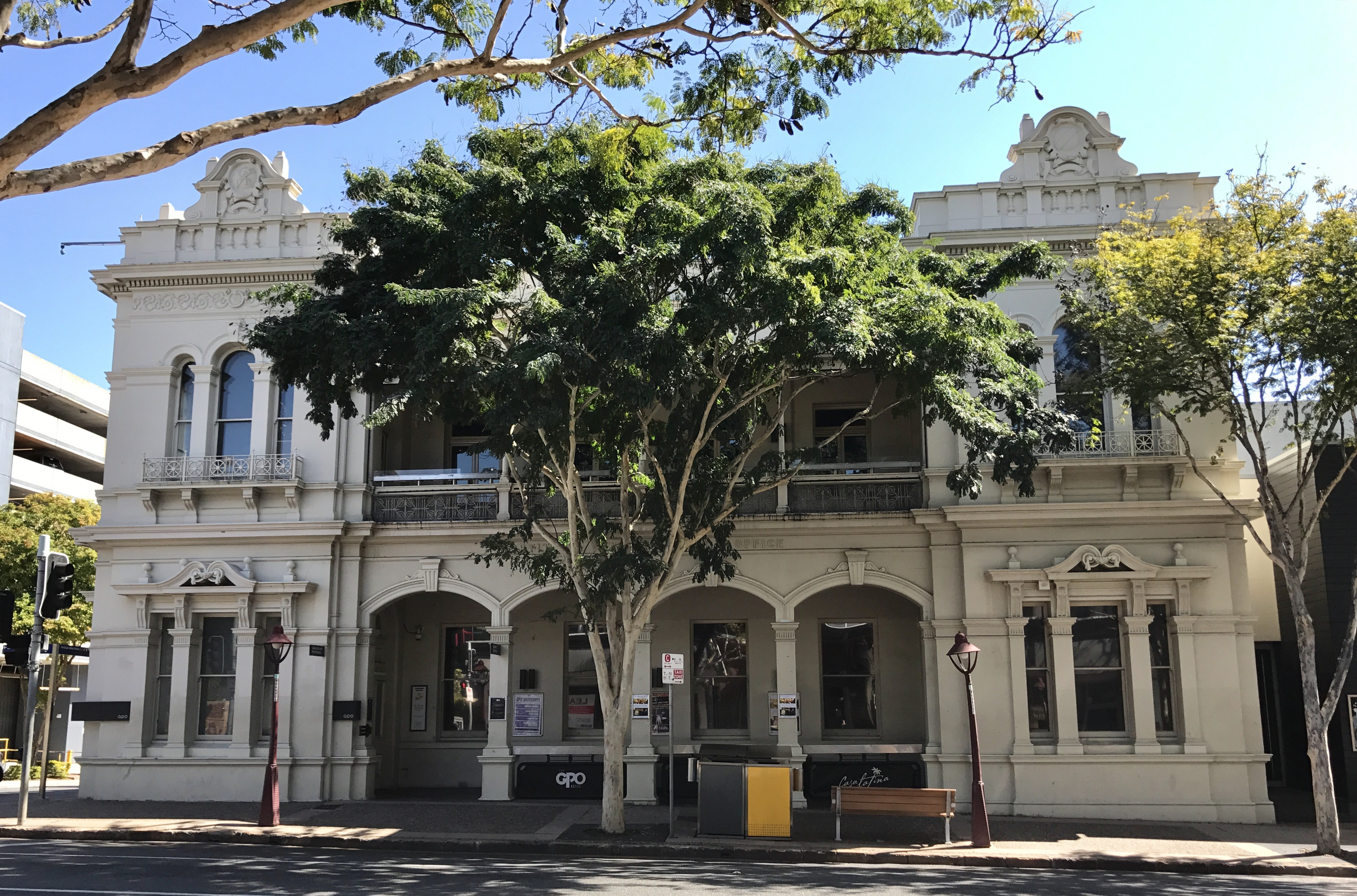
- Fortitude Valley Post Office, 2017

- Location within Queensland Location within Australia
- 27.457°S 153.0362°E
- Location: 740 Ann Street, Fortitude Valley, Queensland, Australia

History
- Design period: 1870s–1890s (late 19th century)
- Built: 1887

Site notes
- Architect: Colonial Architect's Office
- Architectural style: Italianate

Queensland Heritage Register
- Official name: Fortitude Valley Post Office (former), Fortitude Valley Post and Telegraph Office
- Type: state heritage (built)
- Designated: 24 January 2003
- Reference no.: 600198
- Significant period: 1887 (fabric); 1887–c. 1987 (historical)
- Significant components: post & telegraph office, residential accommodation – post master's house/quarters
- Builders: William Ferguson

Fortitude Valley Post Office is a heritage-listed former post office at 740 Ann Street, Fortitude Valley, Queensland, Australia. It was designed by Colonial Architect's Office and built in 1887 by William Ferguson. It is also known as Fortitude Valley Post & Telegraph Office. It was added to the Queensland Heritage Register on 24 January 2003.

== History ==
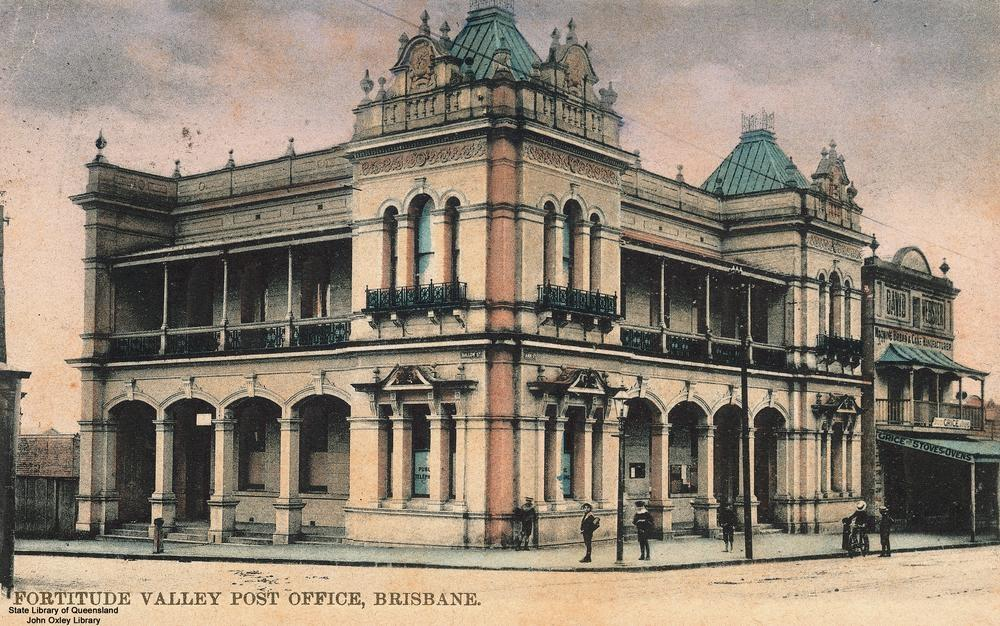
Fortitude Valley Post Office, circa 1907

The Fortitude Valley Post Office and Telegraph Office, as it was first called, was constructed in 1887 by William Ferguson for the Queensland Post and Telegraph Department to a design prepared by the Colonial Architect's Office of the Department of Public Works. The original working drawings are unsigned however it is believed that the design was carried out by either John James Clark, who was the Colonial Architect from 1883 to 1886 or George St Paul Connolly, who held the position from 1887 to 1891. The building, composed in the Victorian Italianate architectural style, is one of only ten substantial Queensland post offices designed in this style that were all built between 1879 and 1898. Comparatively, the Fortitude Valley Post Office has the most ornately detailed cement-rendered facade and is the only post office designed and constructed with mansard roofs. The building was also one of only two masonry post offices that were built in 1887 – all others were constructed of timber.

Government policies in 1887 required that post and telegraph services were combined, and that accommodation for postmasters and their families be provided. Accordingly, the Fortitude Valley Post Office was designed to have post and telegraph services at ground level with living quarters above. A single-storey service wing originally extended northwards to the rear of the building and opened onto a fenced courtyard abutting Ballow Street. Internally the ground floor consisted of a spacious office area for the combined services of post and telegraph. Access to the postal services was via the vestibule located at the corner of Ann and Ballow Streets that led to a small public area with a diagonal counter. Telegraph or parcel services were accessed via the smaller vestibule located at the far end of the arcade facing Ann Street. The first floor was occupied entirely by the postmaster's living quarters and consisted of two living rooms, four bedrooms and an internal bathroom. The single-storey service wing at the rear consists of the postmaster's dining room, kitchen and servant's room. Earth closets were located adjacent to the kitchen, in northern corner of the site.

At the time of the Fortitude Valley Post Office's construction, the suburb was experiencing a period of great business and residential expansion. Nearby areas such as New Farm and Teneriffe to the east and Breakfast Creek and Bulimba Reach to the north were similarly experiencing expansion. The opening of the Teneriffe wharves to international shipping accelerated the growth of the area and this, together with a large increase in the volume of business, placed severe strain on the original postal and telegraph facilities in Fortitude Valley that had been set up in 1877. The government's purchase of the site at the corner of Ann and Ballow Streets in 1884 caused a controversy amongst the local residents and businesses in Fortitude Valley who desirous of a centrally located post office closer to the centre of business, at the corner of Brunswick and Wickham Streets. The matter caused some debate within the Post and Telegraph Department in 1885; however plans for the Ann Street site proceeded irrespectively. Aversion to the post office's location persisted among the local community for many years until eventually the matter was settled in 1936 by the Director-General of the Postmaster-General's Department in Melbourne who declared that funds for the construction of a new post office would not be available.

Following the Federation of Australia, Postmaster General's Department was established in 1901, after which the responsibility for the Fortitude Valley Post Office was transferred to the Australian Government. Minor alterations were made to the ground floor interior in 1909 and again in 1925. It was around this time that the post office took on the ancillary responsibility of social security payments. A report prepared by the Acting District Inspector in November 1929 stated that 1,205 pensions were being paid weekly from the Fortitude Valley Post Office and it was understood that this was, with one exception, the heaviest pensions paying centre in Australia at the time. Documentation of the removal of the mansard roofs and cast concrete capitals from the Fortitude Valley Post Office has not been found; however, it is believed to have occurred prior to 1949. Pressure from the Australian Government to expand facilities eventually led to the vacation of the postmaster from the first floor c. 1950. It was proposed that the rooms be used for a Telegraph and Despatch room and staff facilities; however the area was used minimally thereafter. In 1958 major alterations were carried out on the entire building. Amongst these changes was the introduction of a stairwell in the main entrance vestibule, private letter boxes in the smaller vestibule off Ann Street, removal of all interior walls on the first floor and the partial rebuilding of the service wing at the rear. Further alterations, carried in 1970, caused the rear wing to be completely demolished and replaced with a larger two-storey wing that abuts Ballow Street. Substantial reorganisation of the original post office's interior was also carried out at this time. Suspended ceilings were introduced in some areas of the ground floor at this time.

The Postmaster General's Department remained responsible for the Fortitude Valley Post Office until 1975 when Australia Post and Telecom Australia were created, thus dividing the postal and telecommunication services into two semi-government departments. Australia Post carried out alterations to the building in 1987, which effectively stripped the ground-floor interior of all previous accretions. Externally, some restoration of the original fabric was carried out and a historic colour scheme was reinstated.

By 2010, it was being used as the GPO Hotel.

== Description ==
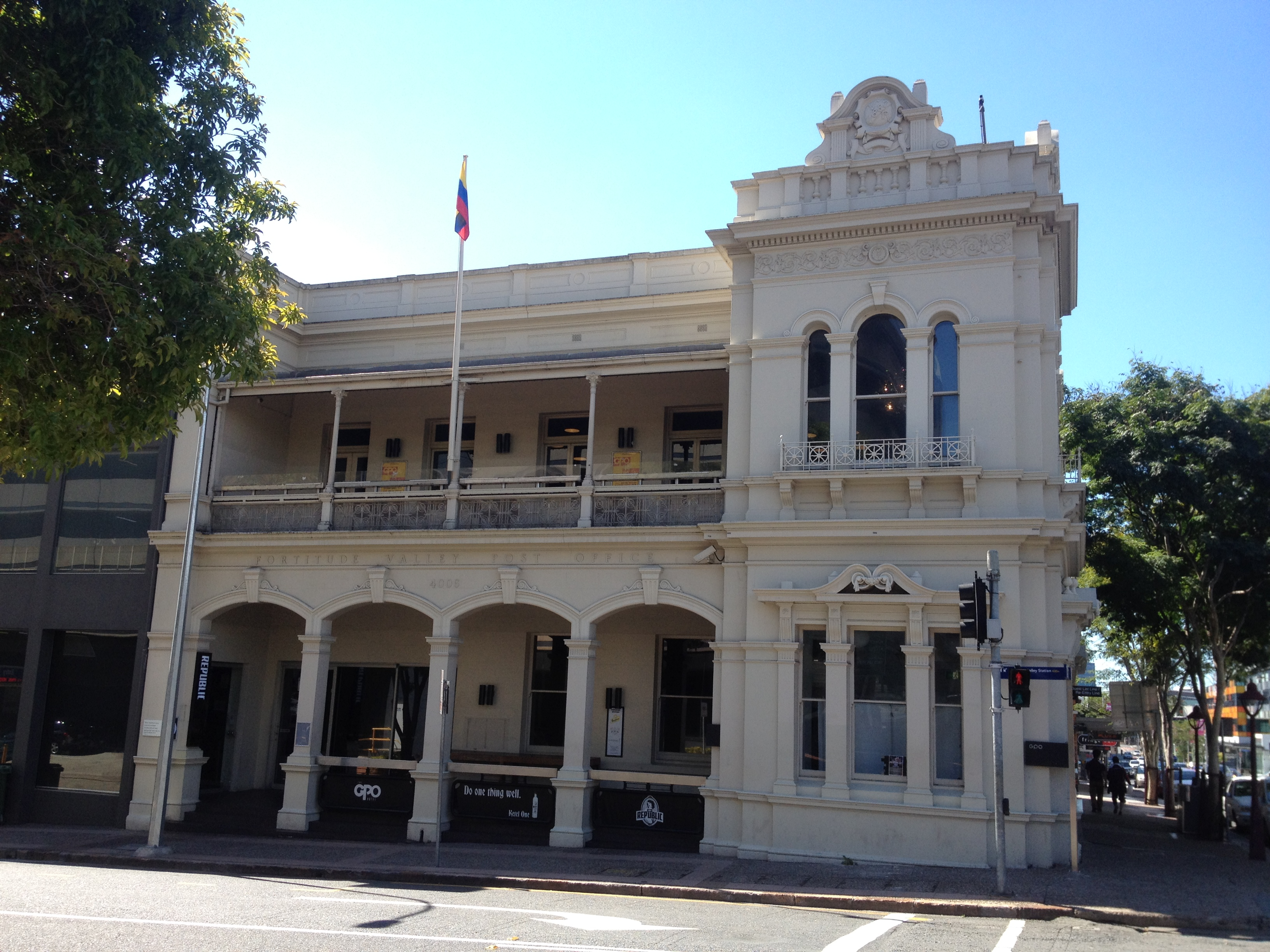
Side view, 2014

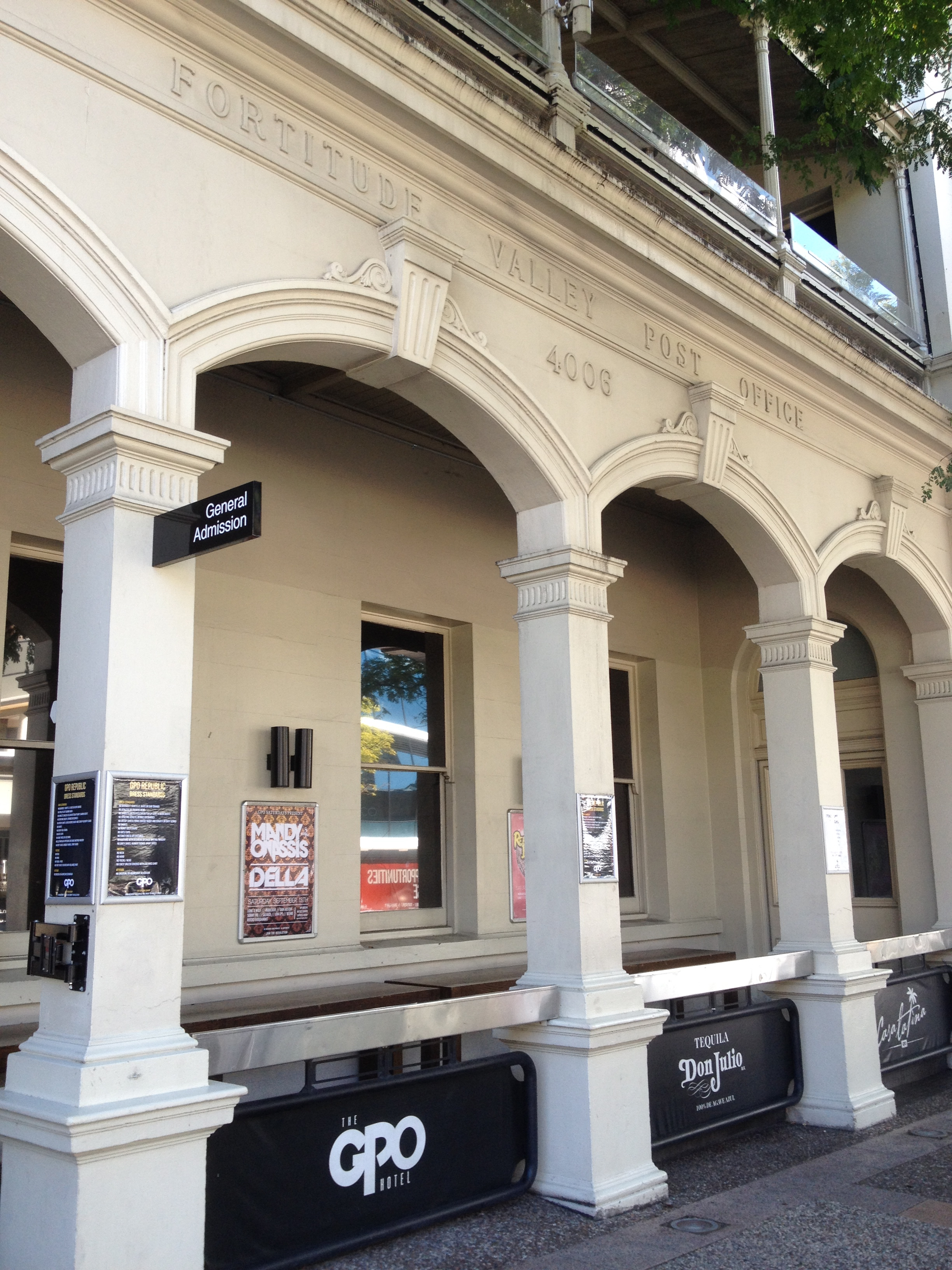
Arcade, 2014

The Fortitude Valley Post Office occupies an almost level south-east corner site at Ann and Ballow Streets, Fortitude Valley, Brisbane. The original building occupies approximately 40 per cent of the existing site allotment No. 21.

The Post Office is a two-storey brickwork, steel and timber construction, with porphyry footings. The brickwork is cement rendered externally and incised with a ruled ashlar finish. The building's southern and eastern corners are elaborately decorated with rendered mouldings that include ornate window hood-mouldings, sculptural friezes, partly balustraded parapets and unusual shaped pediments. Sandstone steps lead up to the ground floor level arcades on both street frontages. The arcades are formed by a set of segmental arches carried by rendered piers supported by pedestals. Above the arcades are open verandahs that have intricately designed cast iron balcony columns and railings.

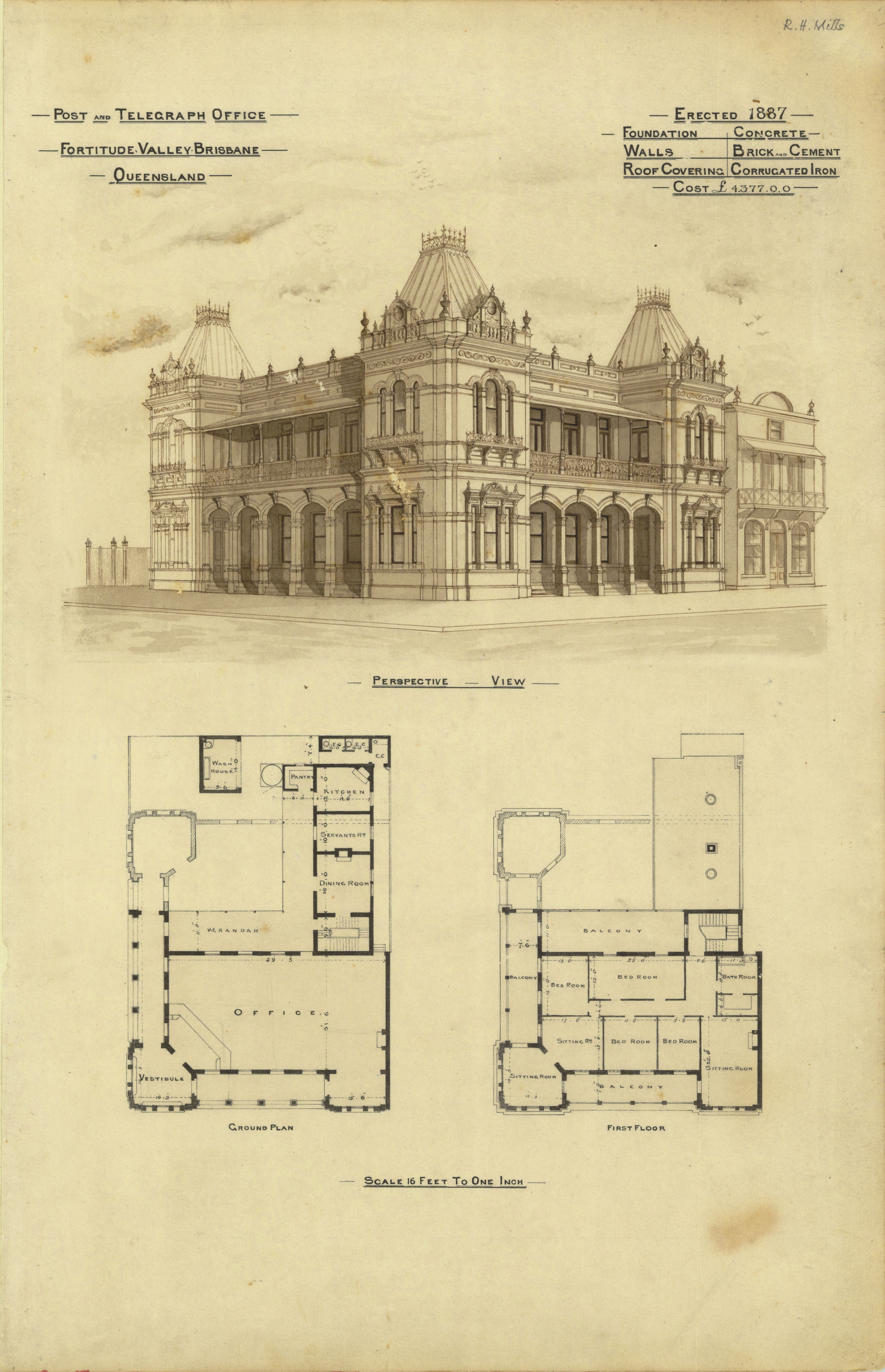
Architectural plans, circa 1888

The original 1887 section of the building is roughly square in plan, with walls that are mainly of plaster-rendered brickwork. Some remnants of the original lath-and-plaster timber-framed interior partition walls survive on the upper floor level. Ceilings and soffits throughout the building are lined with 125-millimetre (4.9 in) beaded tongue & groove boarding; however a timber-framed dropped ceiling, sheeted in plasterboard has been introduced at ground level in some areas. Floors throughout the building are 100-millimetre (3.9 in) hardwood tongue and grooved boards that have been overlaid with carpet at the ground level and vinyl tiles at the upper level. Some original cedar doors and architraves have survived. Two fireplaces, formerly located on the building northern wall, have both been bricked up and their surrounds removed.

At ground level the original building currently consists mainly of a corner vestibule and one large space, partly partitioned to create three small offices along the northern wall. Several openings in the original rear wall of the building provide access to the substantially altered former rear verandah area. As part of the alterations in this verandah area a strong room has been constructed with plaster-rendered brickwork, a reinforced concrete floor and ceiling, and a metal safe door. At the northern end of this area is the original cedar staircase, now painted, which leads to the upper floor. At the upper level there are several large rooms formed by the removal of most original partition walls. Male and female toilets have been introduced along the northern wall. All of the original cedar French doors at the upper level still survive, although they have been over painted.

Adjacent to the 1887 section of the building is a two storeyed brick extension constructed in 1970. The structure, which faces Ballow Street, contains an extensive mail room, private mail box area and garage at ground level, and postman's setting up area and staff lunch area at the upper level. Large openings between the two parts of the building exist at both floor levels.

The roof on the 1887 section of the post office is currently a single low gradient steel deck skillion that slopes from Ann Street down towards the rear of the section. The original chimney stacks have been removed. A second steel deck skillion of similar gradient exists over the later two storeyed section at the rear.

== Heritage listing ==
The former Fortitude Valley Post Office was listed on the Queensland Heritage Register on 24 January 2003 having satisfied the following criteria.

The place is important in demonstrating the evolution or pattern of Queensland's history.

The Fortitude Valley Post Office, built in 1887, is important for its ability to demonstrate the evolution of post and telegraph services in Queensland and the development of Fortitude Valley, at a time of rapid trade, commerce, industry and residential expansion in the area. The grand style and scale of the building demonstrate the prosperity of Fortitude Valley at that time.

The siting of the building at the corner of Ann and Ballow Streets is of interest for the controversy it caused between the government and the local residents and businesses who were preferable of the building being located closer to the business centre of Fortitude Valley. The post office is also of interest for the ancillary role it played in the distribution of social security payments of various kinds during the early 1900s, at which time it was claimed to be among the heaviest pensions paying centre in the Commonwealth.

The place demonstrates rare, uncommon or endangered aspects of Queensland's cultural heritage.

The building is a rare example of a post office composed in the Victorian Italianate style, being one of only ten such buildings designed by the Colonial Architect's Office of the Department of Public Works in that architectural form. The Fortitude Valley Post Office is particularly unusual as the only post office in Queensland to be designed and constructed with mansard style roofs.

The place is important in demonstrating the principal characteristics of a particular class of cultural places.

The building's ornately detailed facade, regarded amongst the most elaborate of all post offices in Queensland, is of considerable aesthetic significance. The variety of mouldings, motifs and cast masonry decorations demonstrate a fine quality of workmanship.

It is of interest as an example of a post office with a combined postmaster's residence.

The place is important because of its aesthetic significance.

The building's ornately detailed facade, regarded amongst the most elaborate of all post offices in Queensland, is of considerable aesthetic significance. The variety of mouldings, motifs and cast masonry decorations demonstrate a fine quality of workmanship. The building remains as one of only a few substantial late nineteenth century buildings in Fortitude Valley, and its contribution to its surroundings is highly significant for demonstrating the character of the area at the turn of the century.

The place has a strong or special association with a particular community or cultural group for social, cultural or spiritual reasons.

The Fortitude Valley Post Office has a strong association with the general community of Fortitude Valley for the essential role it has played in the provision of essential postal and telecommunication services. The siting of the building at the corner of Ann and Ballow Streets is of interest for the controversy it caused between the government and the local residents and businesses who were preferable of the building being located closer to the business centre of Fortitude Valley. The post office is also of interest for the ancillary role it played in the distribution of social security payments of various kinds during the early 1900s, at which time it was claimed to be among the heaviest pensions paying centre in the Commonwealth.
