= Mackay Central State School =

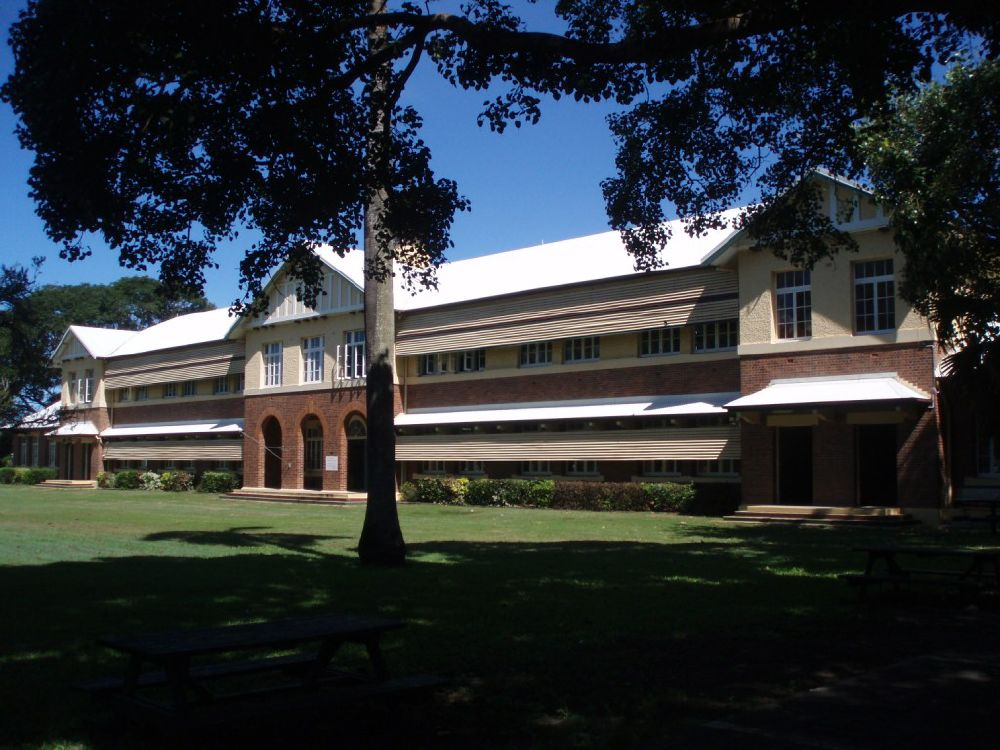
- Mackay Central State School

- Location within Queensland Location within Australia
- 21.146°S 149.182°E
- Location: 251 Alfred Street, Mackay, Mackay Region, Queensland, Australia

History
- Design period: 1919–1930s (interwar period)
- Built: 1933

Site notes
- Architect: Department of Public Works (Queensland)
- Architectural style: Classicism

Queensland Heritage Register
- Official name: Mackay Central State School, Mackay Intermediate School
- Type: state heritage (built)
- Designated: 28 July 2000
- Reference no.: 601911
- Significant period: 1930s (historical); 1930s (fabric); 1933–ongoing (social)
- Significant components: school/school room, roof/ridge ventilator/s / fleche/s

Mackay Central State School is a heritage-listed state school at 251 Alfred Street, Mackay, Mackay Region, Queensland, Australia. It was designed by Department of Public Works (Queensland) and built in 1933. It is also known as Mackay Intermediate School. It was added to the Queensland Heritage Register on 28 July 2000.

== History ==
The Mackay Central State School, the second to be built on the site, was constructed in 1933 to a design from the Office of Public Works.

In search of new pastoral land, John Mackay and his party entered and named the valley of the Mackay River in 1860 (renamed Pioneer River in 1862), and the following year he returned to establish a cattle station. In 1862, the ketch "Presto" entered the Mackay River landing stores and building materials, then surveyed the river mouth, which consequently was gazetted as a Port of Entry. The first settlers arrived in October 1862, establishing the settlement of Port Mackay on the south bank of the river. By the end of 1863, the name of the river had been changed to the Pioneer River, the first survey of the town of Mackay had been made, and the first land sale of town lots had been held.

The town of Mackay soon began to prosper through the growth of the port, the nearby pastoral holdings, and the plantations along the river which included the beginnings of the local sugar industry. River Street developed as a busy waterfront precinct with wharves (the Government wharf opened in 1868), warehouses, offices, ships' chandleries, boat builders, hotels and boarding houses, and the Customs complex which by 1870 included the Customs House, the bond store and the Sub Collectors residence.

The first school on the site, on which the Mackay Central State School was to be built, was opened on 14 September 1871 with 41 pupils. In 1885, when student numbers reached 650, the boys and girls were separated. The boys school remained on the original site, while the girls moved to a site across the road (now the Mackay Entertainment Centre). In 1933, the schools were reunited at the girls' school site.

The present school was constructed in 1933 as the Mackay Intermediate School. In 1928, Intermediate Schools were established to provide vocational training for senior primary school students. At the completion of Grade five, children wishing to have vocational training were sent to the district's intermediate school where they followed the curriculum of sixth and seventh grades as well as compulsory vocational subjects. This policy also avoided the duplication of vocational training equipment at all primary schools. Intermediate Schools were similar in room size and plan form to existing high schools. By 1937, there were Intermediate Schools in Brisbane North (1935), Brisbane South (1929), Bundaberg (1933), Charters Towers (1929), Gatton (1933), Gympie (1933), Mackay, Maryborough Girls and Boys (1936), Mount Morgan (1929), Roma, Warwick (1929) and Ayr (1937).

Designed by the Department of Public Works, the school is architecturally typical of the style of brick schools constructed during the 1930s. Brick schools were popular with architects as they were considered permanent, relatively inexpensive to maintain and labour-intensive. It is partly for the latter reason that thirty brick schools were constructed in Queensland during the 1930s Depression, providing considerable employment relief. Typically, these schools were multi-storeyed, unlike the predominant single storey, timber school buildings. They were symmetrical in plan and usually exhibited classical style elements and featured a prominent central entry. Based on this plan, the Mackay Central State School was constructed as a purpose-built Intermediate School.

The foundation stone of the Mackay Intermediate School was laid by the Queensland Premier and local MLA, William Forgan Smith, on 22 July 1933. The school catered for 600 male and female pupils and comprised fourteen classrooms, domestic science rooms in the eastern wing and manual science rooms in the western wing. Like similarly constructed schools, the classrooms in the Mackay Intermediate School were divided by folding timber partitions.

On completion of the building, the primary schools students moved to their new school and the Girls' School became the Infants School. Students attended the Infant School from grades 1 to 5, then the Intermediate School from which they could graduate to Mackay High School.

In 1967, the Infant and Intermediate Schools combined and became the Mackay Central State School. The building was extended, with a wing constructed at the rear of the building, to provide for the increased numbers of students. The extensions provided an additional three classrooms. Other buildings later constructed on the site include the pre-school and activities block.

Since 2014, the Queensland state education system converted to primary schools teaching Preparatory to 6th year with 7th to 12th year in the secondary. In 2014, as a P-6 school, Mackay Central State had an enrolment of 201 students with 14 teachers (12 full-time equivalent).

== Description ==
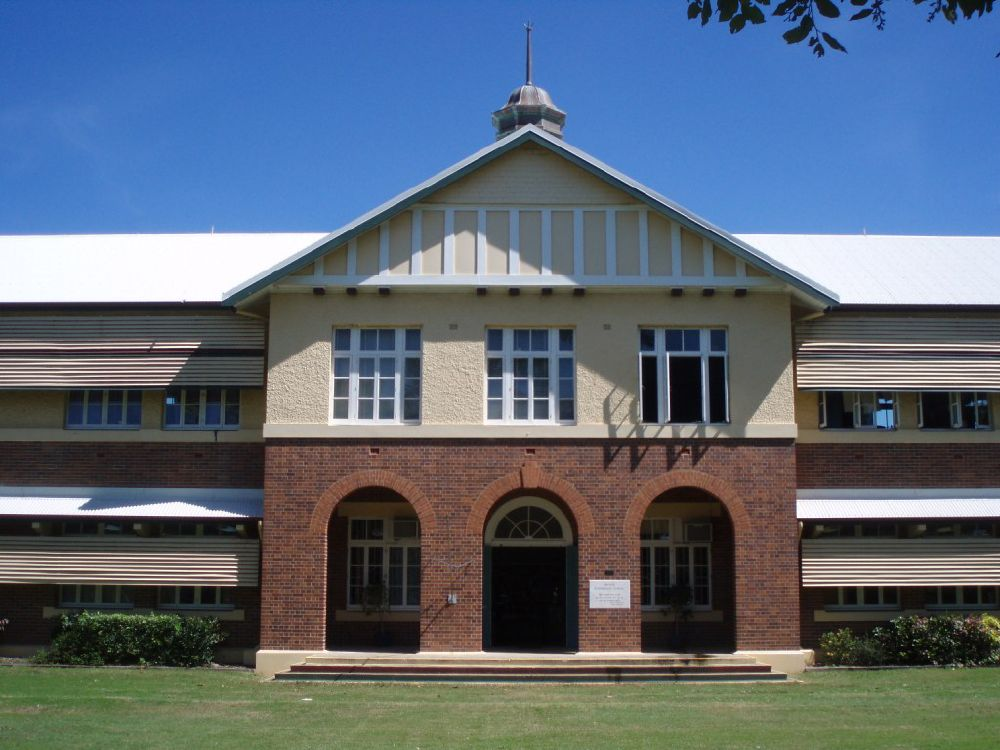
Central entrance, 2009

The Mackay Central State School is a two-storey brick and stucco building with three projecting gable bays. Its roof is clad with corrugated iron. Between each bay the main facade is recessed. There is a single storey level section at each end with a hipped roof. The central entrance comprises a porch of three archways with a half-timbered ceiling. On the roof is an octagonal fleche which has a copper cupola roof and louvred arcading around the sides. All external windows, many original, are multi-panelled casements. The internal windows are multi-panelled sash windows with hopper ventilating top lights. Paired entry doors have four pane glazed top panels set over singular rectangular panels with deep moulded borders. Internal doors are similar, but constructed of timber only.

The school is symmetrical in design. The ground level comprised six classrooms, a teachers room and a passageway. A stove recess is still evident in the domestic science classroom in the eastern wing. There are eight class rooms on the upper floor and three of these can still be subdivided by the original folding partitions. The upstairs ceilings are half timbered and original air vents are extant throughout the building. Bathroom facilities are located at each end of both floors. The main building is reasonably intact and the original configuration of the building has been retained.

The southern and western boundary of the school grounds are planted with mature Banyan figs (Ficus benghalensis). The grounds also include mature mango trees.

== Heritage listing ==
Mackay Central State School was listed on the Queensland Heritage Register on 28 July 2000 having satisfied the following criteria.

The place is important in demonstrating the evolution or pattern of Queensland's history.

Constructed in 1933, as a former Intermediate School, the Mackay Central State School is most significant in demonstrating the results of an important development in Queensland education, established in 1928, where schools provided vocational training for senior primary school student. Evidence of a practical approach can be still seen in the extant stove recess in the domestic science room in the eastern wing of the school.

Mackay Central State School is demonstrative of a government scheme, the Unemployment Relief Scheme, implemented to assist the unemployed throughout Queensland, by means of generating work projects, during the Depression of the 1930s.

The place is important in demonstrating the principal characteristics of a particular class of cultural places.

Further, the Mackay Central State School, is significant as one of the best examples of a purpose-built Intermediate School, the purpose for its use being clearly expressed in the fabric of the building, with the domestic science section located in the eastern wing and the manual arts section located in the western wing.

Constructed in 1933, the school is a good example of the types of brick schools constructed in Queensland during an era of substantial building activity.

The place is important because of its aesthetic significance.

The building is a fine example of a two-storeyed Inter-war brick school. Due to its massing and scale, the building is a landmark in the streetscape, in keeping with the Queensland Government's 1930s policy to raise the educational status of primary education through the construction of well designed, imposing buildings.

Further, the mature boundary plantings, including Banyan figs (Ficus benghalensis) contribute to the aesthetic significance of the site.

The place has a strong or special association with a particular community or cultural group for social, cultural or spiritual reasons.

The grounds on which the Mackay Central State School is built has been the site of public education for over a century, and consequently, is significant for its strong association with the local community.
