= Orient Hotel, Brisbane =

Heritage-listed hotel in Brisbane, Queensland

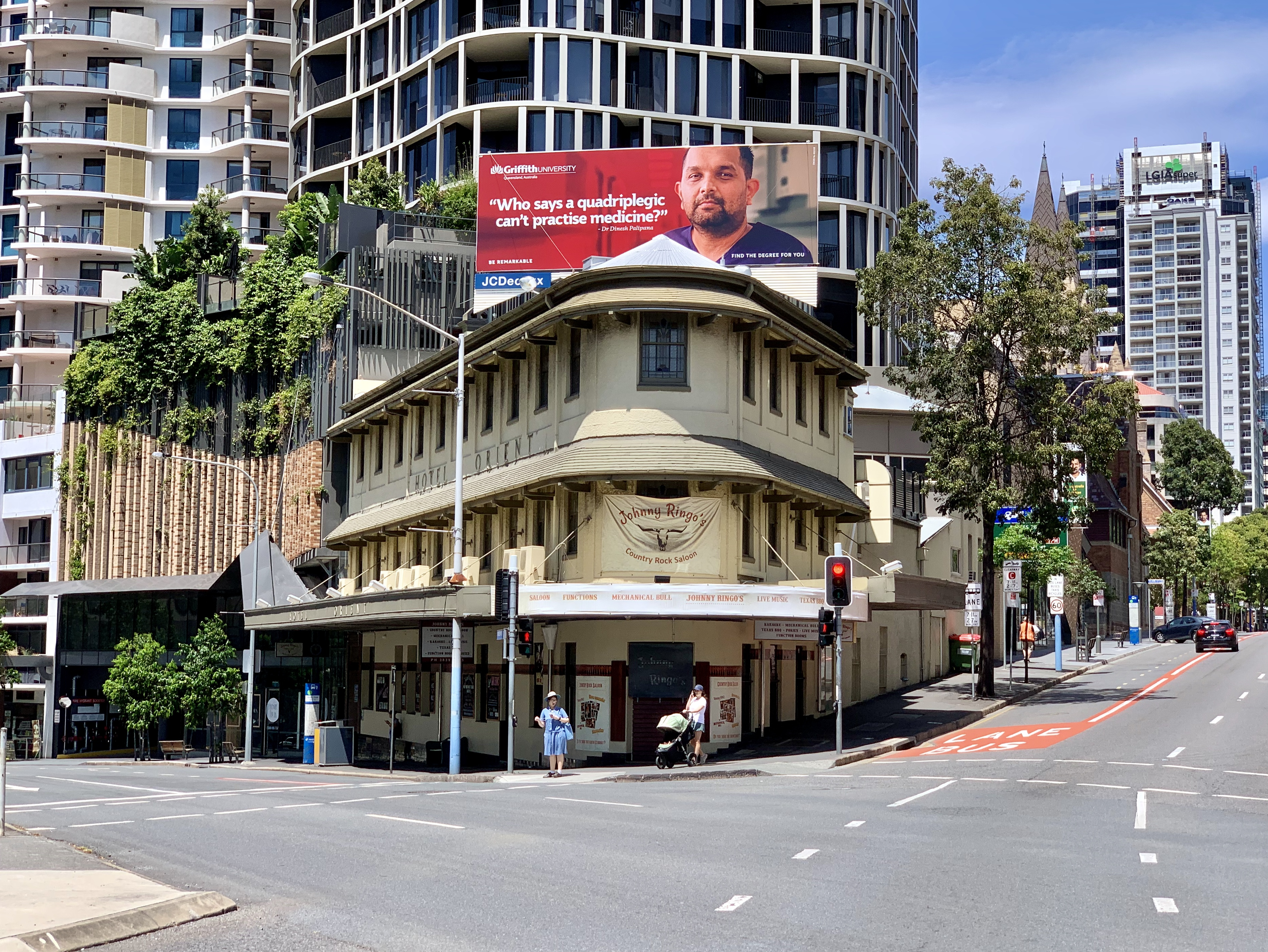
- Orient Hotel, 2019

- Location within Queensland
- 27.4627°S 153.031°E
- Location: 560 Queen Street, Brisbane CBD, Queensland, Australia

History
- Design period: 1870s–1890s (late 19th century)
- Built: 1875–1884

Site notes
- Architect: Richard Gailey

Queensland Heritage Register
- Official name: Orient Hotel, Excelsior Hotel
- Type: state heritage (built)
- Designated: 23 April 1999
- Reference no.: 602122
- Significant period: 1870s, 1880s (fabric); 1875–ongoing (historical use as hotel)
- Significant components: cellar, service wing, lead light/s

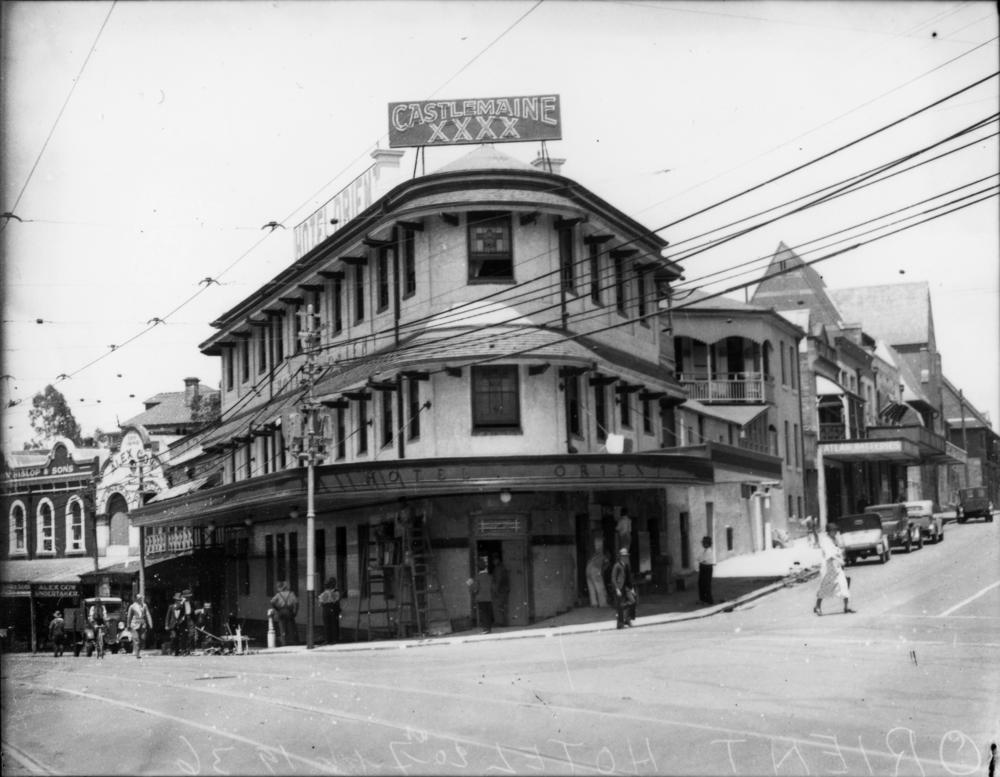
Orient Hotel in 1936

The Orient Hotel is a heritage-listed hotel at 560 Queen Street, Brisbane CBD, Queensland, Australia, on the corner of Ann Street. It was originally built as the Excelsior Hotel in 1875 and extended in 1884, both of which were designed by Brisbane architect Richard Gailey. It was added to the Queensland Heritage Register on 23 April 1999.

== History ==
The Hotel Orient, a three-storeyed brick building erected for Brisbane publican John Morse as the Excelsior Hotel, was constructed in two stages: a two-storeyed building with cellar in 1875, with a third floor and southern extension in 1884. Both stages were designed by Brisbane architect Richard Gailey. Occupying an early Queen Street subdivision, the hotel illustrates the northern extension of the Brisbane central business district around Petrie's Bight in the last quarter of the 19th century.

John Morse emigrated from England to Queensland in 1862. He held the licence to the Assembly Hotel at the corner of Edward and Margaret Streets, Brisbane, from 1865 to 1868, then followed the gold rush to Gympie, where he was licensee of the Bendigo Hotel until returning to Brisbane in 1873, taking up the licence to the Union Hotel at the corner of Ann and Wickham streets (now Centenary Place), which he held until 1875. By 1875 he was married with a young family.

In 1874 Morse purchased in two parcels a small, triangular block diagonally opposite the Union Hotel – 15.4 perches (390 m^{2}) of land at the intersection of Queen and Ann streets, Petrie's Bight. The subdivisions were part of an early town allotment alienated in 1864 by William Hobbs, and subdivided by Josiah Young in 1874. The site was strategically located along Queen Street, the principal thoroughfare between Brisbane Town and Fortitude Valley, and was close to the Union Hotel and Morse's regular client base. Petrie's Bight was then developing rapidly, stimulated by construction of municipal wharves on the Brisbane River downstream from the Customs House in 1875–1877.

Brisbane architect Richard Gailey called tenders for the construction of a hotel at the corner of Queen and Ann streets in November 1874, the same month that Morse gained title to the property. Gailey was a Derry architect who had settled in Brisbane in 1864. He established his own practice here in 1865, and over the next 60 years built up a thriving business, working until his death in 1924. Hotels were Gailey's speciality. He designed over 30 hotels or modifications to existing hotels in Brisbane alone in the period 1869–1895, with hotel work elsewhere throughout the colony. The largest and most opulent of the Gailey-designed hotels were erected during the 1880s, reflecting the general building boom in Queensland during a period of unprecedented economic growth. His impressive surviving boom era hotels include the Regatta Hotel (1886) at Toowong, and in Fortitude Valley the Wickham Hotel (1884–1885), the Prince Consort Hotel (1887–1888), the Jubilee Hotel (1887–1888), and the Empire Hotel (1887–1889). The Hotel Orient is his earliest surviving and still operating Brisbane hotel, and contributes significantly to our understanding of his work.

In mid-1875 Morse registered a £2,000 mortgage on the Queen and Ann Streets corner site, which is likely to have financed construction of the hotel. The building was completed by June 1875, when he applied for a license to operate the place as the Excelsior Hotel. At that time the building was his own property, unoccupied, yet to be licensed, and containing more than the necessary accommodation as required by the Publican's Act. An 1881 bird's-eye sketch of Brisbane shows the early Excelsior Hotel as a two-storeyed building with a cantilevered first floor verandah.

The hotel appears to have prospered with the growth in trade centred around Petrie's Bight. In September 1884 Gailey called tenders for additions to the Excelsior Hotel, consisting of an additional story on the present building, and a three-story building at the southern end, extending from Queen to Ann streets. This established the present form of the building.

About 1888 the remodelled hotel was advertised as one of the architectural features of the city – fitted up with every appliance and found with every convenience necessary to the carrying on of a large business, and the comfortable accommodation of the public. The house is situated in one of the most charming parts of the city, and from it may be gained a panoramic view of the river and the surrounding suburbs. Balconies extend round the hotel, and on these open large and comfortably-furnished rooms, thus securing to the visitor plenty of fresh air during the hot months. A sketch of the hotel which appeared in the Queensland Figaro of 20 April 1889, shows a three-storeyed building with encircling verandahs and French doors on the upper two levels, opening onto the verandahs, with a wider curved street awning at ground level supported by double timber posts. The place was advertised as a family hotel, of first-class standard.

Two decorative iron pillars in the main bar on the ground floor, bearing the lettering A Sargeant & Co., may replace earlier masonry walls. Their style suggests they were installed c. 1890s, which may indicate another period of renovation of the hotel.

John Morse held the licence to the Excelsior Hotel from 1875 until 1906, with one short-term transfer of the license to George Boreham in 1889–1890. In March 1906 Morse retired from the hotel business, moving to Dornoch Terrace in Highgate Hill, and leasing his hotel to publican John Brosnan, who renamed it the Hotel Orient. A year later Brosnan transferred the lease to Isaac Francis, and throughout most of the 20th century there has been a rapid turnover in lessees and licensees of the place. One of the longest-serving licensees was Joseph Thomas Kelly, who held the license throughout the 1930s and to at least the early 1940s.

Morse's wife, Wilhelmina, died in September 1909, and John in December the same year. The Hotel Orient passed to their daughter, Mary Ann Durham, who retained title to the property until August 1912, when it was transferred to Perkins & Co. Ltd, established Brisbane brewers and hotel owners, which became Castlemaine Perkins Limited in 1928. The Orient Hotel remained the property of this company until 1980. There have been a number of owners since.

In the 1920s and 1930s the Hotel Orient was modernised, during a period of substantial hotel renovation throughout Brisbane. Sewerage was connected in 1925, and in 1930 the Marberete Company installed a cold room and builder SS Carrick carried out alterations, both jobs to designs by Castlemaine Perkins' architects George Henry Addison and Herbert Stanley MacDonald. In 1935 Marberete Company carried out further alterations to the Orient, again to the design of Addison and MacDonald. The 1930s renovations included much use of leadlights and pressed metal ceilings, the remodelling of the ground floor private bar and entrance at the southern end of the building on the Queen Street side, and streamlining of the exterior. A photograph of the renovated Orient Hotel, published in The Sunday Truth of 20 February 1936, shows the 1880s ground level posts and awning replaced with a cantilevered flat awning, the first and second floor verandahs removed, the French doors on these levels converted to windows with narrow encircling roofs over, and a large neon sign above the main roof, displaying CASTLEMAINE XXXX. In April 1936, the Orient Hotel was valued at £16,000. Facilities at this time included 2 bars, 3 sitting rooms, 1 dining room, 4 double guest rooms, 15 single guest rooms, 6 sleeping rooms for licensee, family and staff, 4 bathrooms, 9 water closets, and 2 urinals. Although located approximately half a mile from both the Central railway station and the Australasian United Steam Navigation Company (AUSN) wharf, the place was used extensively by the travelling public, and averaged 15 guests per week.

Another significant refurbishment of the Orient Hotel was undertaken c. 1956. By this time the corner entrance was no longer in use, and the public bar was accessed from Queen Street. The 1956 renovations included changes to the public bar, and the rearrangement of guest lounge, dining room and kitchen facilities on the first floor, to permit increased accommodation for the licensee and staff.

In the early 1980s further substantial refurbishments included the gutting of much of the first floor for a new dining room, bar and kitchen, and changes to the public bar on the ground floor. In 1990 the public bar acquired its present configuration, and in 1995 the premises were converted to budget accommodation, with ensuite bathrooms installed on the top floor.

Despite the ongoing refurbishments, the Orient Hotel retains its 1880s form, and remains one of few 19th century hotels to survive in the Brisbane central business district, where once there were many. It continues to trade as a hotel, and is one of the longest licensed hotels in inner Brisbane, pre-dated only by the Victory Hotel (on the northeast corner of Edward and Charlotte Streets – originally the Prince of Wales Hotel, established 1855), the Exchange Hotel (northwest corner of Edward and Charlotte streets, from 1863), the Port Office Hotel (southeast corner of Edward and Margaret streets – initially the Shamrock Hotel, from 1864), and the Treasury Hotel (northwest corner of George and Elizabeth streets – originally the Dunmore Arms Hotel, from 1865). Social change and renovation of the central business district with high-rise office and apartment blocks, has seen the demolition of 19 major city hotels since 1970 – particularly those which occupied strategic corner positions on principal thoroughfares, as was typical of Brisbane's 19th century hotels.

The Hotel Orient demarks the juncture between Brisbane CBD and Fortitude Valley along a major inner city thoroughfare. Its landmark value is particularly noticeable since the late 20th century demolition of the nearby National Hotel, a late 1880s hotel which occupied a similar triangular-shaped corner site one block to the east, at the intersection of Queen and Adelaide streets.

== Description ==
The Hotel Orient, a three-storeyed rendered masonry structure with a hipped corrugated iron roof, is located on an acute corner site at the intersection of Queen and Ann Streets, a major intersection on the edge of the central business district. The building's highly visible location and expressive form make it a city landmark.

The building is located on a triangular site, with the earliest section at the northern end of the site fronting Queen and Ann Streets, and the later addition forming a wing across the southern part of the site linking both street frontages. A small service yard with some later infill is located on the northwest fronting Ann Street, and the wedge-shaped corner of the building fronting Queen and Ann Streets is rounded to form a sharp curve.

The ground floor has an awning to the Queen Street frontage and to the northern end of the Ann Street frontage. The awning is supported by steel tie-rods fixed to the exterior of the first floor, and has decorative pressed metal soffit and fascia, with the name HOTEL ORIENT in relief. The Queen Street frontage has an entrance at the southern end, with regularly spaced sash windows fronting the street and returning along the Ann Street frontage. The entrance is accessed via a flight of steps to recessed doors which have a leadlight fanlight panel. A metal grille above the entrance has the letters H and O intertwined, and the side walls are finished with glazed ceramic tiles with a decorative frieze and trims. The glazed ceramic tiles continue along the street frontage; however they have been covered with a textured coating with only the frieze being left exposed. The windows along the Queen Street frontage dating from the interwar refurbishment have decorative leadlight panes, and later sash windows retain evidence of being adapted from earlier doorways. The corner has evidence of earlier doorways, and currently has paired non-original timber framed glass doors with a raised threshold which aligns with an internal stage area. The windows to the Ann Street frontage have their sill heights at footpath level, with a cast iron palisade set in the sill to each window. An entrance to the bar is located at the western end of the original section of the Ann Street elevation.

The first and second floors have regularly spaced sash windows with decorative leadlight panes fronting Queen Street and returning along the Ann Street frontage. The windows have continuous window hoods to both levels supported by shaped timber members and clad with shingles. The walls are finished with a textured render.

The remainder of the Ann Street frontage consists of the end elevation of the southern wing, which has textured render and two sash windows per floor. Verandahs enclosed with fibrous cement sheeting and sliding window units are located on the northern side of the southern wing, and return along the western side of the main section. The entrance to the small service yard is located adjacent to the enclosed verandah, and has lattice screening and a skillion roof. Later infill also fronts Ann Street between the small service yard and the central section of the building, and consists of an early section to the ground level finished with textured render, and a later brick first floor section with skillion roof. The building has several rendered chimney stacks, a large billboard is mounted on the roof fronting the intersection, and a deck has been constructed over the small service yard at the level of the second floor.

Internally, the building has a cellar at the southern end, mostly located under the Queen Street end of the southern wing. The cellar has both face brick and squared rubble-coursed porphyry walls, and two brick arched alcoves are located on the western side. The cellar is accessed via concrete steps from the enclosed service yard area, which is split-level and located between the ground and first floors.

The ground floor has a large bar area at the northern end fronting both streets. The corner contains a non-original raised stage area, and the ceiling is coffered with beams possibly indicating the locations of original load bearing walls and central corridor. Two cast iron columns are located towards the stage end of the bar area, and correspond to a change in direction of the central corridor to both upper floors. The bar fit-out is non-original, and toilets are located behind the bar area fronting Ann Street. An entrance foyer with reception/office is located at the southern end fronting Queen Street, with a stair accessing the upper floors. The foyer has pressed metal ceilings, and decorative leadlight doors and fanlight separate a second smaller bar at the rear. This bar has pressed metal ceilings, and timber wall panelling to door head height. Toilets are located at the rear of the bar, and early windows with leadlight panes open to the adjacent service yard.

The first floor is entered via a stair at the southern end which access a central lobby. This lobby is located at the western corner of the intersection of the main section of the building and the southern wing. A second dogleg stair, located on the eastern side of this lobby, accesses the second floor and has turned timber balusters and timber handrail. Paired timber doors open either side of the stair, with an arched leadlight fanlight to the southern door. The northern end of the first floor has been fitted out as a nightclub, and the majority of the internal walls have been demolished and render has been removed exposing the brickwork. The form of the early corner lounge with fireplace is still visible, and window architraves and sills survive. A small bar separates this area from a pool room at the southern end of the floor, which has rendered masonry walls and fireplace. A kitchen is located on the western side of the nightclub, in an addition fronting Ann Street.

Steps to the side of the first floor central lobby access the enclosed verandah to the southern wing. A narrow timber stair, with timber balustrade and handrail, is located within the verandah and accesses the second floor, and evidence remains of it originally accessing the ground floor. The verandah detailing includes dowel balustrades, narrow louvred timber panels, and an arched timber boarded valance with rounded ends. The verandah walls to the southern wing are of painted brickwork, and have flat-arched sash windows and doors with fanlights which access store rooms and toilets.

The second floor retains the early layout of a central corridor, with rooms opening to either side, which returns to connect with the enclosed verandah to the southern wing. At this level, the enclosed verandah returns along the western side of the main section of the building. Ensuite bathrooms have been added to the rooms, by either converting an existing room into two ensuites or by constructing an ensuite in part of an existing room. Arches are located in transverse corridor walls, and some early detailing survives including doors and fanlights, architraves, skirtings and arch mouldings. The deck over the small service yard is accessed from the enclosed verandah.

== Live music and club nights ==
The Hotel Orient has been the host of numerous club nights since Lulu's in the 1980s, Popscene in the 1990s, and a venue for live music throughout. The venue created a tee shirt featuring the names of hundreds of bands which played the venue between 1989 and 1991, as well as a book including flyers for gigs during that period. Bands such as Screamfeeder, Powderfinger and Custard played at the venue in their infancy, along with lesser-known Brisbane bands such as Chopper Division, and interstate acts such as Lime Spiders, Nick Barker & The Reptiles, Screaming Jets, The Crystal Set and Def FX.

Beyond live music events, DJ sets have featured at one-off events. Electronic music producer Luke Slater played the venue in 1997.

== Heritage listing ==
Orient Hotel was listed on the Queensland Heritage Register on 23 April 1999 having satisfied the following criteria.

The place is important in demonstrating the evolution or pattern of Queensland's history.

The Hotel Orient, erected as the Excelsior Hotel in two stages, 1875 and 1884, is important in illustrating the pattern of settlement in Brisbane. The 1884 additions in particular are illustrative of the growing economic and social sophistication of colonial Brisbane.

The place demonstrates rare, uncommon or endangered aspects of Queensland's cultural heritage.

The Orient is one of a handful of surviving 19th century hotels in central Brisbane, and is important for its rarity.

The place has potential to yield information that will contribute to an understanding of Queensland's history.

It is important in illustrating the evolving nature of inner city hotels, and has the potential to reveal further information about 19th and 20th century hotel design and evolution.

The place is important in demonstrating the principal characteristics of a particular class of cultural places.

Despite numerous refurbishments, the place retains its 1870s-80s footprint, form, streetscape presence, and much early fabric, illustrating some of the principal characteristics of a 19th-century three-storeyed, masonry, first-class hotel, including the corner siting and clear evidence of a former corner entrance, a footprint which follows the shape of the land subdivision, provision of ample accommodation on the top floor, a rear service wing, and stone cellar.

The place is important because of its aesthetic significance.

Much of the fine 1930s refurbishment survives, including the street awning and continuous window hoods, internal and external finishes, highly decorative leadlights, and pressed metal ceilings and cornices. These elements, together with the building's expressive form and highly visible location, contribute to its considerable aesthetic and architectural significance.

The place has a strong or special association with a particular community or cultural group for social, cultural or spiritual reasons.

The Hotel Orient demarks the juncture of the Brisbane Central Business District and Fortitude Valley along a major inner city thoroughfare, and as such has landmark significance with strong social value.

The place has a special association with the life or work of a particular person, group or organisation of importance in Queensland's history.

The place is important for its association with the work of architects Richard Gailey, George Frederick Addison and Herbert Stanley MacDonald.
