= Royal George Hotel and Ruddle's Building =

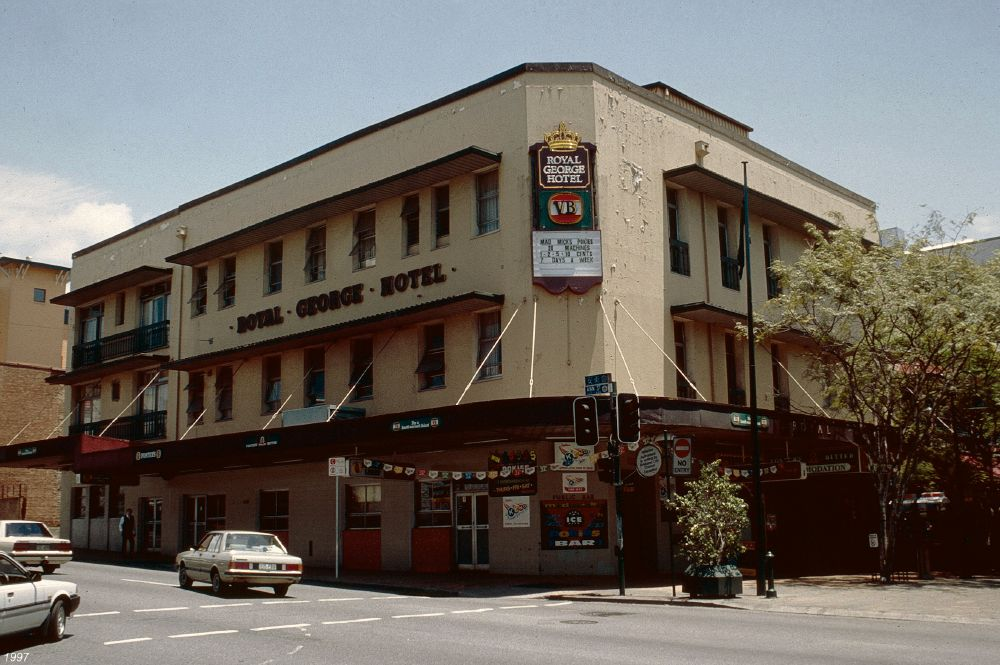
- Royal George Hotel and Ruddle's Building, 1997

- Location within Queensland Location within Australia
- 27.4585°S 153.0346°E
- Location: 323–335 Brunswick Street, Fortitude Valley, City of Brisbane, Queensland, Australia

History
- Design period: 1840–1860s (mid-19th century)
- Built: c. 1850–1960s

Queensland Heritage Register
- Official name: Royal George Hotel and Ruddle's Building, Bush and Commercial Inn (aka Commercial Inn), Freemasons Arms, Ruddle's Corner
- Type: state heritage (built)
- Designated: 3 August 1998
- Reference no.: 601248
- Significant period: 1850s–1920s (fabric); 1850–ongoing (historical use of hotel); 1901–1942 (Bank in Ruddle's Building)
- Significant components: shop row, loggia/s, hotel / inn, basement / sub-floor, bank

Royal George Hotel and Ruddle's Building is a heritage-listed hotel at 323–335 Brunswick Street, Fortitude Valley, City of Brisbane, Queensland, Australia. It was built from c. 1850 to the 1960s. It is also known as Bush & Commercial Inn, Commercial Inn, Freemasons Arms, and Ruddle's Corner. It was added to the Queensland Heritage Register on 3 August 1998.

== History ==
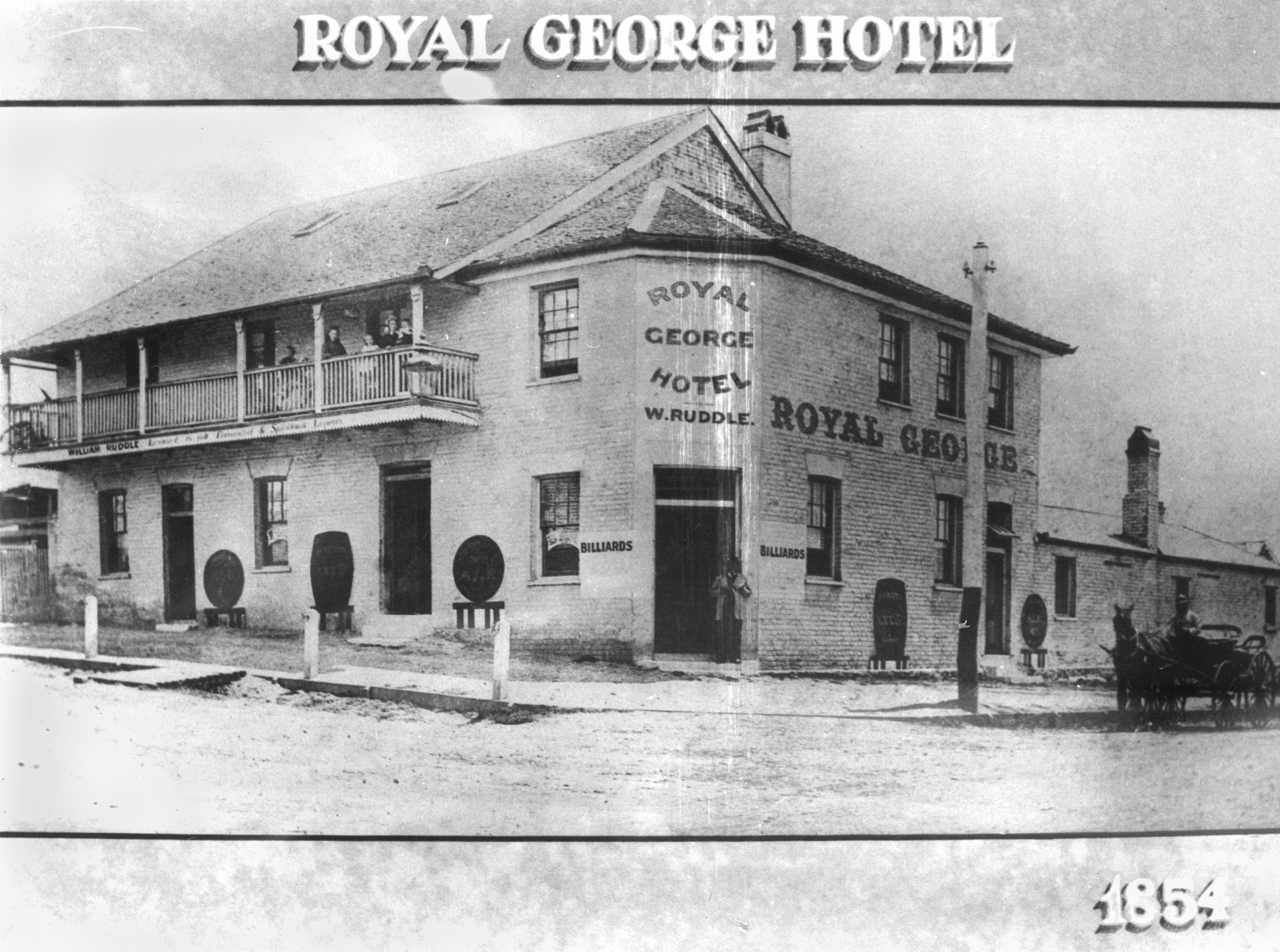
Royal George Hotel, circa 1876

The Royal George Hotel and Ruddle's building are located on the strategic intersection of Ann and Brunswick Streets (now Brunswick Street Mall), Fortitude Valley. A hotel is known to have existed on this site since 1850. The three-storey brick Royal George Hotel contains an early (possibly as early as 1850) two-storey core to which several major stages of works have been undertaken. In 1886 major additions transformed the hotel into a late Victorian building; by 1924 a third floor had been added; works undertaken in the 1960s (the current manifestation of the hotel) stripped much of this Victorian decoration from the building. The adjoining two-storey brick Ruddle's building was erected in 1901 by William Ruddle whose family operated the Royal George for some 60 years. The building was designed by Brisbane architect Robin Dods to complement the hotel (as it then was) and to accommodate a number of different tenancies including the Commercial Banking Company of Sydney. Together the two buildings form what was known as Ruddle's corner.

The site originally comprised part of Eastern Suburban Allotment 71 alienated in 1850 by James Gibbon. In that same year some 54 perches of ESA 71 was acquired by William Sam Sutton, licensee of the Bush and Commercial Inn at Kangaroo Point. In December of that year Sutton was granted permission to transfer his publican's license to his new premises also known as the Bush and Commercial Inn (also known as the Commercial Inn), the forebear of the Royal George. Sutton's hotel was one of only a dozen or so licensed premises in Brisbane at this time including one other in Fortitude Valley, Jeremiah Scanlin's the Strangers Home located diagonally opposite the Commercial Inn.

The two inns were well situated on a strategic intersection of what were then known as the roads to (the former penal establishments of) Eagle Farm and New Farm. In addition to passing trade they serviced the fledgling settlement of Fortitude Valley, established in 1849 as a temporary village by some 256 immigrants privately sponsored by John Dunmore Lang, in response to the refusal of government assistance upon their arrival at Moreton Bay. By 1851 however, the Commercial Inn was no longer licensed and Sutton was in financial trouble; his property being offered for sale by the Sheriff in execution of a judgment obtained by Brisbane businessman John Richardson. The Sheriff's advertisement provides the first description of the earliest known hotel on the site; Sutton's Commercial Inn being described as "a large brick Building – one portion carried up one story, and the corner portion roofed in and occupied as a Public-house ... There is also an excellent detached Brick Kitchen, Sleeping Rooms, and Stables, securely fenced in with a high Fence".

Based on a combination of evidence (including the Sheriff's advertisement, a later photograph of the hotel, and 1960s floor plans) it is believed that the hotel at this stage comprised a two-storey brick section with slate roof and cantilevered verandah fronting Ann Street with a single storeyed brick wing wrapping around the corner of Ann and Brunswick Street (the distinctive chamfered section) attached to the northern end of the Ann Street section.

The property was not apparently sold at this time but instead passed to Sutton's creditor, John Richardson. In addition to his business interests, Richardson was the local representative in the New South Wales Legislative Council and a supporter of both John Dunmore Lang and separation. It is not known whether Richardson resided at the property although all buildings were apparently occupied (albeit the Commercial Inn was no longer licensed). In 1853 Richardson advertised the property for sale in two lots, the first lot containing the hotel described as "a corner two-story House, two Cottages, and two Brick Houses in an unfinished state. The House contains two sitting rooms, kitchen, and three bed rooms, and is well adapted for a Public House or Store. The Cottages are plastered and comfortably finished; the whole substantially enclosed, and all occupied". The properties were described as "well worth the attention of all who either require a house of their own or a good investment for their money, as they will be sold fifty per cent, under what they could now be built for".

In October the Moreton Bay Courier reported that the unfinished brick building at Fortitude Valley, formerly in the occupation of Mr Sutton, has been sold by Mr Richardson, the proprietor for £600, and will be opened as a hotel. The property described as subdivisions 2, 3, and 4 of block 3 and sub 1 of block 6 of ESA 71 was acquired by William John Loudon (sometimes called London) who established the Freemasons Arms (also known as the Freemasons Hotel) on the site, obtaining a license in April 1854 becoming the only licensed premises in the Valley, the nearby Strangers Home Inn losing its license in that year.

By 1854, only five years after the arrival of the immigrants of the Fortitude, the (Fortitude) Valley was a thriving village exhibiting the most visible changes in Brisbane: there was a "good brick inn" (Loudon's Freemasons Hotel) in the main street and a constable to keep order; North Brisbane and Fortitude Valley were almost joined with perhaps a kilometre of vacant land between the buildings of the two communities; the land through to Breakfast Creek was opening up; and Fortitude Valley became part of the suburban spread with the subdivision and sale of the early large allotments.

Given that the hotel building was described on its sale to Loudon as unfinished, it is believed he must have undertaken some building works at this time, possibly adding a second storey to the corner section. During 1854 regular horse and cattle sales were held at the hotel which was apparently considered convenient for its abundant stabling, yards, and excellent paddocks close at hand for the reception of stock previous to day of sale without any extra charge. Loudon remained as licensee of the Freemasons Hotel (renamed the Lamb Inn in 1857) until 1859 although in 1858 the premises (including the hotel and 3 cottages) were sold to Jeremiah Daly. In 1860 George Challenger became licensee and in the following year John Harvey who remained until the hotel license was taken up in 1863 by George Dickens, who had acquired the hotel in 1861. It is Dickens who is believed to have changed the name of the hotel to the Royal George (in 1863). Apparently on account of ill health, Dickens advertises the hotel for let in July 1864:

THE ROYAL GEORGE HOTEL fronting Ann and Brunswick Streets Fortitude Valley. Comprising 18 rooms, out houses, good stabling, spacious yard, and capital cellar. The above is a corner allotment fronting Ann Street being the main road to Breakfast Creek, Eagle Farm, German Station, Bald Hills, Sandgate, and Pine River with a frontage to Brunswick Street leading to Bowen Bridge, Kedron Brook & c. The House is an old established one, and doing a good business, and the proprietor's reason for relinquishing business is on account of ill health in his family ...

A new licensee was not apparently found until the following year when the license was transferred to Henry Penfold and in 1866 to Michael Daly and in the same year back to Dickens (until 1868). In 1868 the property was conveyed to Dickens' mortgagee, the Anglican Bishop of Brisbane. A Sam Loudon (also written as London) is listed as licensee from 1869–1870 when Henry Farley assumes the license until 1872. 1872 is to mark the beginning of a more stable proprietorship of the Royal George. In that year William Ruddle leases the hotel from the Anglican Church (officially the Corporation of the Synod of the Diocese of Brisbane) who owned in addition to the Royal George several other blocks of land on this part of Brunswick Street. A photo taken during this time (between 1872 and 1886) shows the Royal George hotel much as it is believed to have existed in the 1850s. By this time a second storey had been added to the chamfered corner section; an adjoining single-storey building on Brunswick Street also formed part of the hotel site.

In 1885 Ruddle purchased the hotel with a mortgage back to the Anglican church of £3,000. The 30.5 perches of land included the site (to the west of the Royal George) on which the Ruddle's building was later to be erected. In the following year major alterations and additions were undertaken to the hotel, the first of two stages of work which transformed the building into a late Victorian hotel, a form the Royal George would take until the 1960s. This transformation was the work of prominent architect Francis Drummond Greville Stanley. Stanley (1839–1897) emigrated from Scotland to Queensland in 1861 joining the Office of the Queensland Colonial Architect in 1863 becoming Superintendent of Roads and Buildings (later called Colonial Architect) from 1872–1881. Queensland's longest serving Colonial Architect, his work included the Brisbane's Supreme Court (1874–79) and the General Post Office (1871–1872). Described as the best known of all Queensland's early architects because of the quality, diversity, and extent of his work, his private clients included several banks including the Queensland National Bank (for whom Stanley designed their headquarters in Queen Street (1880–1885)) and the Anglican Church. His hotel work included:

- The Grands in Maryborough (1884–1885) and Bundaberg (1885–1886)
- Transcontinental Hotel in George Street, Brisbane (1884)
- Lennon's Hotel, George Street, Brisbane (1883–1885) (demolished)
- Clarence Hotel at Clarence Corner, Woolloongabba (1888–1889)

A contemporary report describes Stanley's additions as including taking off the roof of the present building and raising it 4 feet (1.2 m), extending the hotel further along Brunswick Street, making a large cellar underneath, and the addition of cast iron verandahs to the Ann and Brunswick Street elevations. Internally there were new bedrooms, parlours, bar, large dining room, kitchen and offices.

The new Royal George was part of an 1880s hotel boom in the Valley including the nearby Empire Hotel, Prince Consort Hotel, Wickham Hotel, and Jubilee Hotel, all built between 1885 and 1888. Each was a substantial building located on a prominent site, designed to be conspicuous and offering extensive accommodation and the most modern facilities. Significantly each was funded by a Valley businessman investing in the local community. Such buildings (albeit the Royal George in a somewhat more modest way) reflected the optimism and bravado of the booming Queensland economy of the 1880s, a period of unprecedented economic growth when Brisbane was virtually rebuilt as a prosperous late 19th century Victorian era city, an image sustained until well after the Second World War.

Despite a downturn in the Queensland economy in the 1890s the Valley continued to develop, led by the large retailers TC Beirne and James McWhirter, who both established stores on Brunswick Street in the 1890s which quickly grew to become large department stores and further fuelled by the developing Brisbane tram network in which the Valley was a central node. By the turn of the century the Valley was established as the second major commercial district of the city supplanting South Brisbane and the Woolloongabba Fiveways.

For several years after the completion of the additions (until c. 1894) the Royal George was leased to Thomas Proe, then Perkins & Co, and back again to Proe. Apart from that period the hotel remained under the proprietorship of the Ruddle family until 1936. Against the backdrop of a flourishing Fortitude Valley, William Ruddle expanded his enterprise. In 1901 he purchased the adjoining block on Ann Street from Samuel Cohen. An 1898 plan shows two double storeyed brick buildings on the site; one facing Ann Street at the southern end of the site and the other adjoining the Royal George. Based on later (1960s) floorplans this adjoining building may in fact have been two buildings already joined. This was later to be incorporated as part of the Royal George.

In the same year (1901) Ruddle mortgaged his hotel block to the church for £10,000 apparently to finance the erection of the Ruddle's building; Hall & Dods called for tenders for the erection of 3 shops banking premises and additions etc. Robin Dods (1868–1920) had a highly developed architectural imagination; his introduction of the formal and philosophical ideas of both the British Arts and Crafts movement and Edwardian classicism and his significant functional solutions to the problems of living and building in Queensland combined to achieve an architectural revolution in Brisbane. The two storeyed Ruddle's building situated between the Royal George and the TC Beirne Department Store (for whom Hall & Dods carried out several large commissions including substantial works to the Valley store) comprised several different tenancies whose presence was variously articulated in the form and decoration of the building. The western portion of building was designed and used as premises for the Commercial Banking Company of Sydney (previously the tenants of TC Beirne the bank in the building until 1942 when they moved to their new premises on the opposite side of Brunswick Street). The ground floor portion housed the banking chamber; the first floor with its recessed loggia overlooking Brunswick Street (illustrative of Dod's interest in climatic adaptations) may have provided accommodation for the manager. The portion adjoining the hotel housed several commercial tenancies initially including a jeweller, a ham and beef store and a dentist. Above the stores was a photographer's studio occupied by William Ruddle's son, Roland until 1930/31.

In 1902 William Ruddle's son, Ernest became the licensee. During his proprietorship a number of changes were made. By 1914 part of the adjoining Ann Street building (purchased by William Ruddle in 1901) had been incorporated as part of the hotel. By 1924 the second stage of the Victorian manifestation of the hotel had occurred with the addition of a third floor containing guest accommodation. This work involved the replacement of the semi-circular pediments by triangular pediments (echoing the eastern pediment on Ruddle's building) and included the addition of a third floor to the adjoining Ann Street building (or buildings) with verandahs at the two upper levels and pediment detailing continued from the hotel building to complete the visual incorporation of the building with the Royal George. An advertisement in the Brisbane Centenary Official Historical Souvenir (1924) proclaims the Royal George as "One of Brisbane's Oldest Establishments" (evidenced by a photograph dated 1854 to 1886 showing the early brick hotel) but also as "A First-class New and Up-to-date Modern Hotel" (illustrated by a contemporary photograph of the three-storey Victorian hotel; dated 1886 to 1923).

Following the death of William Ruddle in 1919, the hotel and Ruddle's Building passed in trust to his two sons Ernest and Roland. In 1927 the properties were acquired by Ernest Ruddle. In that same year internal alterations were undertaken by architects GHM Addison and Son and builders FJ Corbett and Sons. The modern hotel was described by the Architecture and Building Journal of Queensland although none of the work described appears to have survived:

The public bar is unique as far as Queensland is concerned having two island bars in the one room. These bars are both built of marble as are also the floors, and as the walls are tiled, the whole of the bar can be hosed out when required. Special attention has been given throughout to the fittings, which are of Queensland silky oak

In 1936, the Telegraph trumpeted the sale of the hotel to brewers Castlemaine Perkins: "HISTORIC ROYAL GEORGE HOTEL IN VALLEY SOLD AT A RECORD PRICE". This was to mark the end of a 60-year association by the Ruddle family.

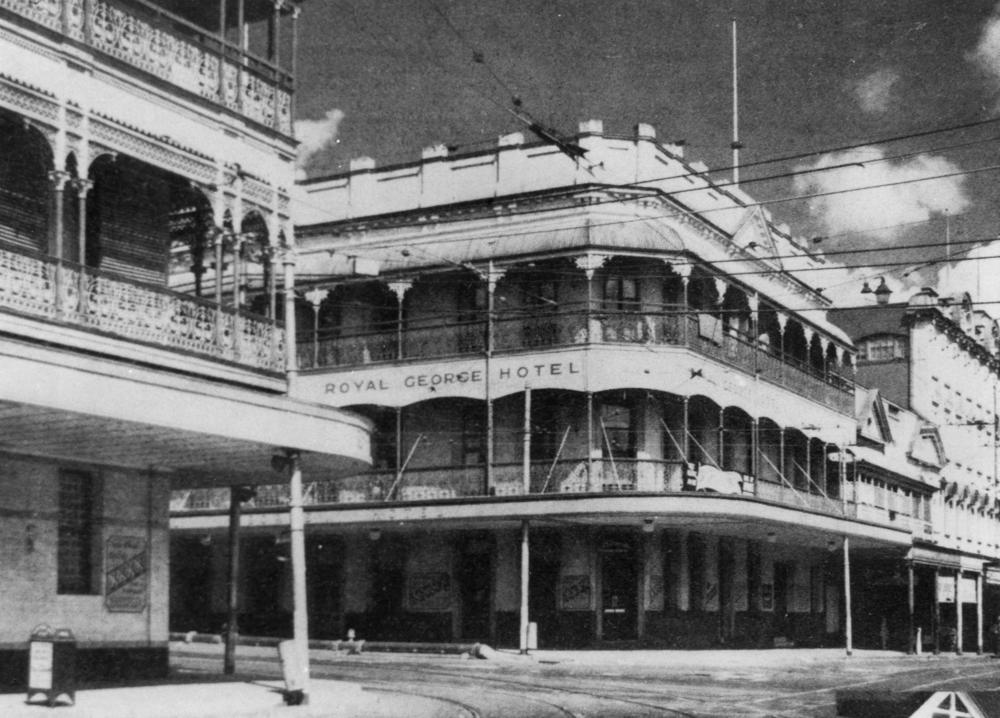
Royal George Hotel, circa 1942

Work undertaken during this period included prior to 1949 a cantilevered awning being installed to the former bank section of Ruddle's building. By 1951 other changes to the Ruddle's building included the removal of various ancillary structures to the rear of the building, the erection of toilets at ground level to the rear of what was now the former bank section, and additions to the rear of the eastern end of the Ruddle's building. In 1961 drawings for the second major transformation of the Royal George were prepared by architect HS McDonald. The works costing £100,000 were undertaken by contractor Frederick Allan Pidgeon. They involved the removal of the Victorian verandahs; the conversion of some French doors to windows, the removal of the entry from the chamfered corner, and the incorporation of part of the ground floor of Ruddle's building into the hotel.

In 1986 the properties were acquired by Quetel Pty Ltd (later Royal George Hotel Holdings). More recent 1990s changes have followed on the formation of the Brunswick Street mall which saw the construction of a raised platform across the former footpath outside the hotel and part of Ruddle's building and the removal of walls on the ground floor of Ruddle's building. Both the Royal George Hotel and Ruddle's building continue as active parts of the social fabric of the Valley: the Royal George accommodating both pub patrons and residents; Ruddle's building currently houses a bar and live music venue in the former bank and a cafe and two bars in the other section.

== Description ==
The Royal George Hotel is located on the western corner of Brunswick and Ann Streets, opposite the Empire Hotel on the southern corner. Ruddle's Building adjoins the Royal George Hotel to the northwest, and also adjoins the former TC Beirne Department Store to the southeast.

=== Royal George Hotel ===
The Royal George Hotel is a three-storeyed rendered masonry structure with a corrugated iron hipped roof concealed behind a parapet. The street corner of the building is chamfered, and the core of the building consists of the c. 1850 section, but essentially what is presented is a 1960s make-over of the Victorian hotel. It is believed that the surviving elements of the c. 1850 core consist of the relative sections of exterior walls, chamfered corner, door/window openings, and some internal structural walls.

The ground floor has an awning to both Ann and Brunswick Streets. The awning is supported by metal tie rods fixed to the face of the building at the first floor window head height. The first and second floors have predominantly regularly spaced aluminium-framed hopper windows to the Ann Street elevation, and aluminium framed French doors with metal balustrades to the Brunswick Street elevation, with continuous cantilevered metal awnings. The ground floor has predominantly regularly spaced aluminium-framed door and window units accessing the public bar and lounge along the Ann Street elevation, and the main entrance which accesses the first and second floor accommodation fronts onto Brunswick Street. The ground floor walls are finished with ceramic tiles, and the Ann Street elevation has the name ROYAL GEORGE HOTEL in relief below the second floor windows.

The southwest end of the Ann Street elevation comprises a visually distinct section of the hotel, which was constructed prior to 1898 as a separate building (or buildings) and was amalgamated into the hotel during the addition of the second floor and verandahs by 1924. Whilst the external treatment of this section is similar to the main section of the Royal George Hotel, it is distinguished by a slightly recessed elevation, changes in floor levels and a stepped street awning. The first and second floors have aluminium framed sliding glass door and window units, with continuous metal balustrades and cantilevered awnings. The southwest end elevation has timber-framed sash windows to the second floor, and a number of non-original openings have been introduced to the first floor.

The rear of the building has a series of metal fire escape stairs, and most of the windows have been replaced with metal-framed units. The rear of the site consists mainly of a service area with access via a driveway from Ann Street on the southwest side.

Internally, the building has a public bar on the ground floor fronting Ann Street, with a lounge at the southwest end. A lobby entrance fronts Brunswick Street, with a lift and main stair accessing the first and second floor accommodation. A second bar, located at the northwest end of the Brunswick Street elevation, opens into the southern tenancy of the adjoining Ruddle's Building and onto a timber deck constructed over the footpath. Toilets and service areas are located at the rear. A central stair accesses a basement to the corner section of the hotel which is connected to the basement areas of Ruddle's Building to the northwest. The basement contains evidence of the original structure, particularly the structural walls.

The first and second floors comprise hotel rooms opening off a central corridor, with communal facilities at the rear, and a smoking lobby facing Brunswick Street. Original transverse structural walls survive at the first floor level, as well as the external walls fronting Ann Street. The southwest section has a higher floor level, and the hotel rooms in this section each have bathroom en suite. The northwest end of the first floor level also has hotel rooms with bathroom en suites, and the central corridor opens through to the first floor level of Ruddle's Building adjacent.

=== Ruddle's Building ===
Ruddle's Building is a two-storeyed rendered masonry structure with three parallel corrugated iron hipped roof sections concealed behind a parapet. The northwest hipped roof has a small non-original clerestory section with a curved roof which provided light to an internal stair which is no longer extant.

The building consists of the former Commercial Banking Company of Sydney premises on the northwest side, and three tenancies adjacent to the southeast. This is expressed on the Brunswick Street elevation at ground level as four shopfronts. The first floor elevation comprises a separate tenancy at the northwest end (the former Commercial Banking Company of Sydney), with the remaining three tenancies composed as a single unit with a unifying verandah.

The building is essentially an infill structure which has the overall effect of creating a gradual change of scale and proportion which responded to the adjoining Royal George Hotel (in its 1886 form) to the southeast, and an earlier form of the former TC Beirne Department store to the northwest. The unifying architectural elements included pedimented parapet details, comprising triangular and curved pediments on the Royal George Hotel which were later incorporated into the redevelopment of the former TC Beirne Department store, and which were consciously linked and referenced through the utilisation of triangular and broken apex curved pediments on Ruddle's Building.

The rear of the building, constructed of rendered masonry, has single-storeyed additions containing amenities, kitchens and store areas with corrugated iron roofs. Non-original steel framed stairs and walkways access the first floor.

==== North-west tenancy ====
The northwest tenancy (the former Commercial Banking Company of Sydney), currently a bar/live music venue, has a non-original awning to Brunswick Street. The awning is supported by metal tie rods fixed to the face of the building at the first floor window sill height, and comprises a deep metal fascia and pressed metal ceiling. The ground floor comprises a non-original timber framed shopfront with central paired timber framed glass doors, with a recessed original doorway at the northwest end. This doorway retains original fanlight and architrave detailing, and originally accessed a corridor leading to the rear internal stair and rear offices. The doorway is currently not used, and the internal planning has changed. The first floor elevation is composed of a central recessed section which continues to the parapet, with an arch with expressed extrados and keystone flanked by wall sections which appear as oversized pilasters each with a central window. The arch opens to a recessed loggia with projecting curved balcony with a wrought steel balustrade, and each window has non-original glass louvres. Expressed drip moulds frame the arch and window openings. An oversized keystone and arched drip moulding, which originally framed the arched entry to the banking premises, is extant below the balcony and above the non-original awning, however much of the original detailing of the ground floor elevation has been removed. The parapet comprises a broken apex curved pediment, and the entablature has oversized dentils.

The building has a two-storeyed section at the rear, with an angled side boundary wall, which forms an access way at the ground level and houses toilets at the first level.

Internally, the ground floor of the northwest tenancy contains a stair on the northwest side accessing the first floor, a bar and seating area, and a separate room at the rear housing a pool table. The rear room has an original tall sash window with architraves, some original detailing such as picture rails, and evidence of early openings in the rear wall. The bar and seating area has a tiled floor, and the walls and ceiling are finished with compressed sheeting. The first floor houses a function room with three large openings onto the recessed loggia fronting Brunswick Street. The clerestory lights the rear of the space, and a door opens into the rear office which has a tall sash window and original details such as architraves and skirtings. A short corridor accesses a bathroom at the rear, which has a boarded ceiling with timber cornice, and original panelled door and architraves.

==== Other tenancies ====
The remaining section of the building, which comprises three tenancies, has an awning to Brunswick Street which steps between the adjacent awnings of the Royal George Hotel and the northwest tenancy of the building. The awning has a deep timber fascia, raked boarded timber ceiling and is supported by four columns with Ionic capitals, above each of which is a single sphere. The ground floor comprises three tenancies, currently comprising a cafe and two bars, none of which have original shopfronts. The cafe has a timber framed shopfront with central paired timber framed glass doors. The middle bar has one large opening with a roller door, and the southern bar has been incorporated into the adjoining Royal George Hotel. The southern bar has a raised timber deck constructed over the footpath, and the front wall consists of two sets of folding timber framed glass doors either side of a timber framed window servery.

The first floor elevation is original and comprises a central cantilevered verandah with turned timber posts and balusters, and an ogee shaped corrugated iron awning with oversized dentils to the eaves. A pediment with oversized dentils to the entablature surmounts the awning fronting the parapet, and is flanked by the letters WR on the southern side, and the date 1901 on the northern side. Above these are short sections of balustrade to the parapet. The verandah has a raked boarded ceiling, a central timber partition, and multi-paned French doors with fanlights and expressed architrave mouldings.

The rear of the building has a unifying first floor verandah which has been enclosed with a combination of multi-paned windows, weatherboards and vertical boarding.

Internally, the ground floor of the remaining section of the building houses three tenancies, consisting of a cafe and two bars. The cafe has a non-original raised ground floor, which functions as a mezzanine and affords views of the basement seating area. The cafe has a seating area fronting Brunswick Street to both the basement and raised ground floor, a kitchen and amenities at the rear, original deep cornices and a non-original stair at the rear. Both bars have non original fit-outs, and the southern bar functions as an extension of the adjacent Royal George Hotel. Both bars have basements, with brick arches in adjoining walls. The first floor, which consists of rooms opening off a central corridor, is currently used as accommodation for the staff of the Royal George Hotel, and is accessed via the first floor corridor of the hotel. Sash windows and French doors with tall fanlights open onto the rear enclosed verandah, which has a boarded raked ceiling and face brick exterior wall.

== Heritage listing ==
Royal George Hotel and Ruddle's Building was listed on the Queensland Heritage Register on 3 August 1998 having satisfied the following criteria.

The place is important in demonstrating the evolution or pattern of Queensland's history.

The forebear of the Royal George Hotel was established on this site in 1850. Known as the Bush and Commercial Inn (later called the Freemasons Arms, Lamb Inn, and from 1863 the Royal George), that early hotel building comprising two brick sections including the distinctive chamfered corner section still apparent today, is believed to form the core of the Royal George Hotel.

The evolution of the Royal George Hotel over several stages from the 1850s is important in illustrating the development of Fortitude Valley. The surviving 1850s core is important and rare surviving evidence of the beginnings of the area; its transformation in 1886 to a late Victorian hotel during Queensland's economic boom in the 1880s was part of a substantial rebuilding of the Valley at this time including the building and rebuilding of a number of Valley hotels. Despite the removal of much of the Victorian decoration in the 1960s the form of the Victorian hotel remains to illustrate this period when the Valley rivalled North and South Brisbane as one of the principal commercial precincts of Brisbane. Erected in 1901 by Royal George owner and licensee, William Ruddle, Ruddle's building was built to cater for the continued commercial growth of the Valley despite the general downturn in the Queensland economy during the 1890s.

The place demonstrates rare, uncommon or endangered aspects of Queensland's cultural heritage.

The surviving 1850s core is important and rare surviving evidence of the beginnings of the area; its transformation in 1886 to a late Victorian hotel during Queensland's economic boom in the 1880s was part of a substantial rebuilding of the Valley at this time including the building and rebuilding of a number of Valley hotels.

The place has potential to yield information that will contribute to an understanding of Queensland's history.

Built just one year after a settlement was established in the area by the immigrants of the SS Fortitude, that core (including masonry load bearing walls in the basement and first floor) constitutes rare surviving early fabric which has the potential to reveal evidence of both the workings of a hotel and building practices in the mid 19th century.

The place is important in demonstrating the principal characteristics of a particular class of cultural places.

Although the Royal George Hotel has been substantially altered on several occasions, the building retains sufficient elements such as masonry load bearing construction, basement, ground floor public areas, accommodation to the upper floors, and the pattern of external openings which formerly opened onto verandahs, to sufficiently demonstrate the typical characteristics of a late nineteenth century hotel. Ruddle's Building is important in exhibiting the principal characteristics of the work of architect RS (Robin) Dods, including a considered response to climate, robust detailing, and carefully composed elevations which, with the use of architectural elements, perform an important role in consciously linking and referring to adjacent buildings to create a coherent streetscape.

The place is important because of its aesthetic significance.

Located on a prominent street corner, the Royal George Hotel and Ruddle's Building are important elements in the Fortitude Valley streetscape. Ruddle's Building is of architectural and aesthetic importance, and through its form, scale and materials, illustrates a skilled design approach. Elements such as the recessed loggia and cantilevered first floor verandah demonstrate a considered response to climate, and surviving fabric (particularly in the rear rooms) provide important evidence of the building's original robust internal detailing.

The place has a strong or special association with a particular community or cultural group for social, cultural or spiritual reasons.

Apart from two very short periods when the hotel premises were unlicensed, this site, strategically located on the corner of Ann and Brunswick Streets, once known as the roads to the (former penal settlements) of Eagle Farm and New Farm, has been in continuous use as a hotel site for over 140 years giving the site considerable social significance.

The place has a special association with the life or work of a particular person, group or organisation of importance in Queensland's history.

Known together as Ruddle's corner, the Royal George Hotel and Ruddle's building, has a long association with the Ruddle family, members of whom were well known "Valley" people.
