= Regatta Hotel =

Historically significant hotel in Brisbane, Australia

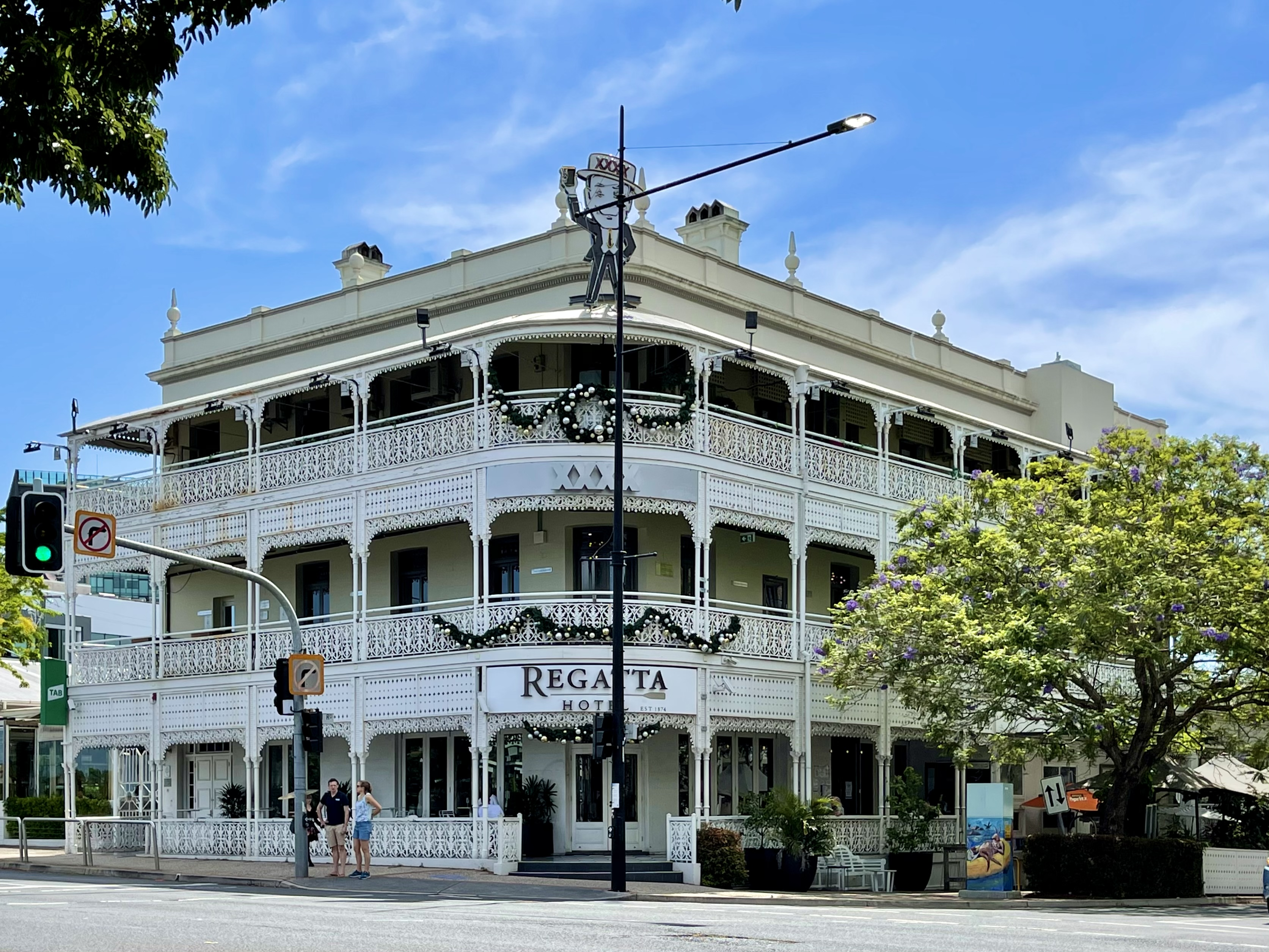
- View from Coronation Drive, 2020

- Location within Queensland
- 27.4825°S 152.9962°E
- Location: 543 Coronation Drive, Toowong, City of Brisbane, Queensland, Australia

History
- Design period: 1870s–1890s (late 19th century)
- Built: 1886

Site notes
- Architect: Richard Gailey
- Architectural style: Victorian Filigree
- Website: http://www.regattahotel.com.au/

Queensland Heritage Register
- Official name: Regatta Hotel
- Type: state heritage (built)
- Designated: 21 October 1992
- Reference no.: 600331
- Significant period: 1880s (fabric); 1886–ongoing (historical use)
- Significant components: cellar
- Builders: George Gazzard

Regatta Hotel is a heritage-listed hotel at 543 Coronation Drive on the corner of Sylvan Road, Toowong, City of Brisbane, Queensland, Australia. It faces the Toowong Reach of the Brisbane River and was named after the rowing regattas held there. It was designed by Richard Gailey and built in 1886 by George Gazzard. It was added to the Queensland Heritage Register on 21 October 1992.

== History ==
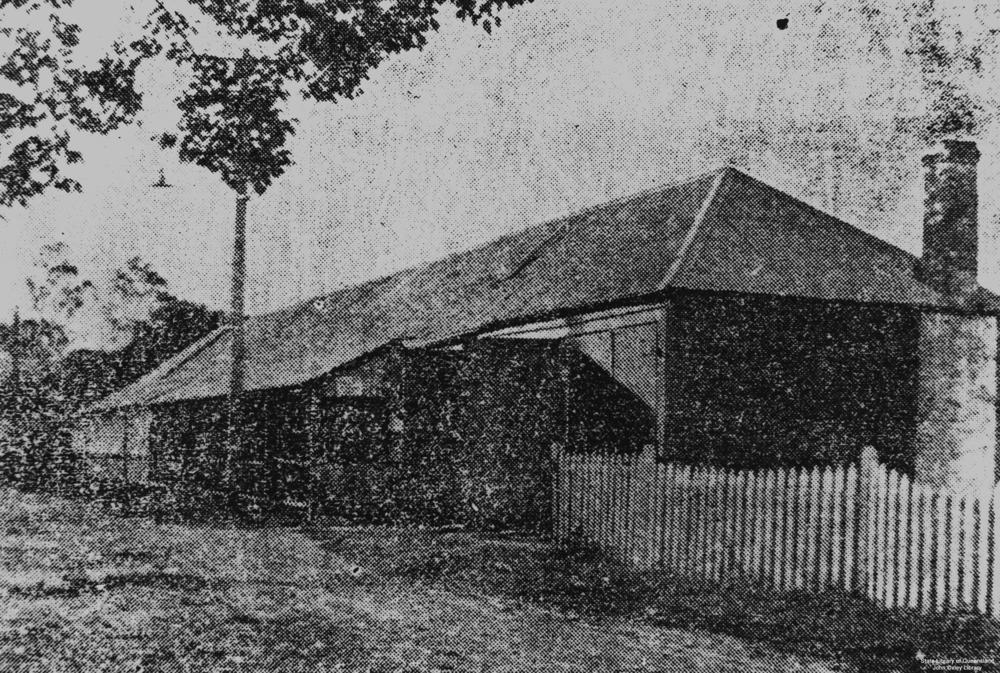
First Regatta Hotel, circa 1880

The first hotel was established on the site in 1874, as a single-storey wooden building.

In 1886, the current and second Regatta Hotel, three-storeyed brick building, was erected for Brisbane publican William Winterford. The first building was removed to make way for the new premises. The new Regatta was designed by Brisbane architect Richard Gailey, who called tenders in February 1886. It was constructed by contractor George Gazzard, at a cost of £4,800.

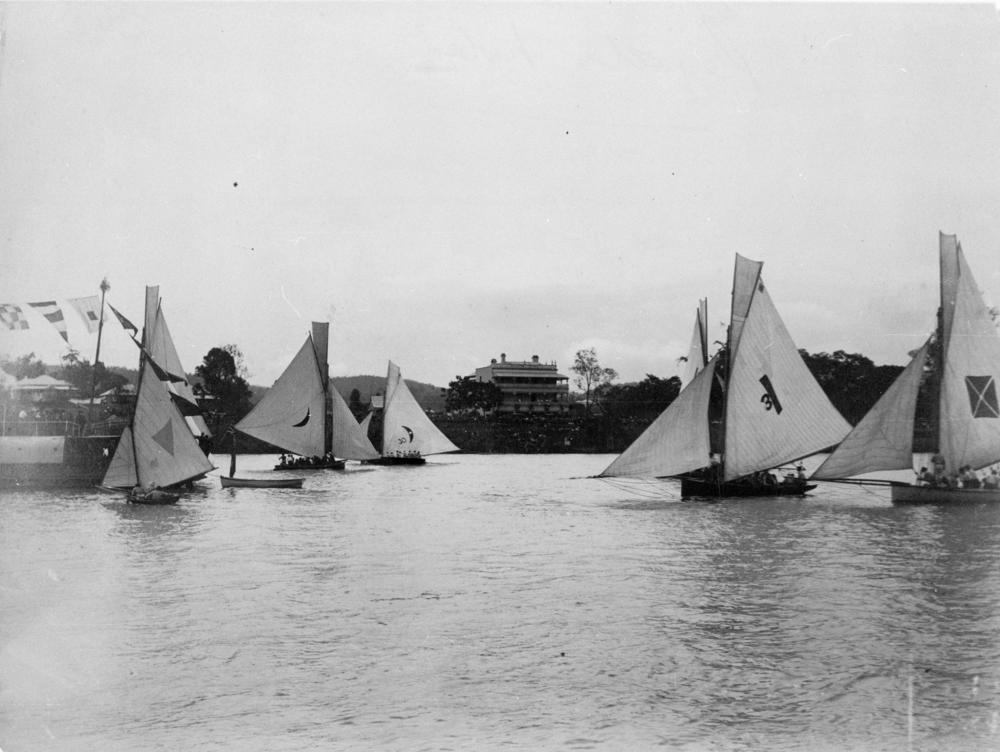
Yachts in the Toowong Reach in front of the Regatta Hotel, 1897

The Regatta was one of a number of large, masonry, first-class hotels designed by Gailey in the 1880s. Amongst these were the Wickham Hotel (1885), Prince Consort Hotel (1887), Jubilee Hotel (1888) and Empire Hotel (1889). They were designed not just for local patronage, but to attract travellers and visitors. Each replaced an earlier and much humbler hotel on the site, and in their ornate exteriors, they reflected the optimism and bravado of the booming Queensland economy of the 1880s.

Winterford opened his new hotel in 1887, anticipating a clientele who would be enticed by the river views, the proximity to town and to the Toowong railway station, the weekend regattas on the doorstep, entertainments such as billiards and boating, a well-stocked wine cellar, large well-ventilated bedrooms, family suites, the luxury of hot and cold baths, and good stabling accommodation. However, neither the hotel's comforts nor the Toowong scenery succeeded in attracting the desired patronage.

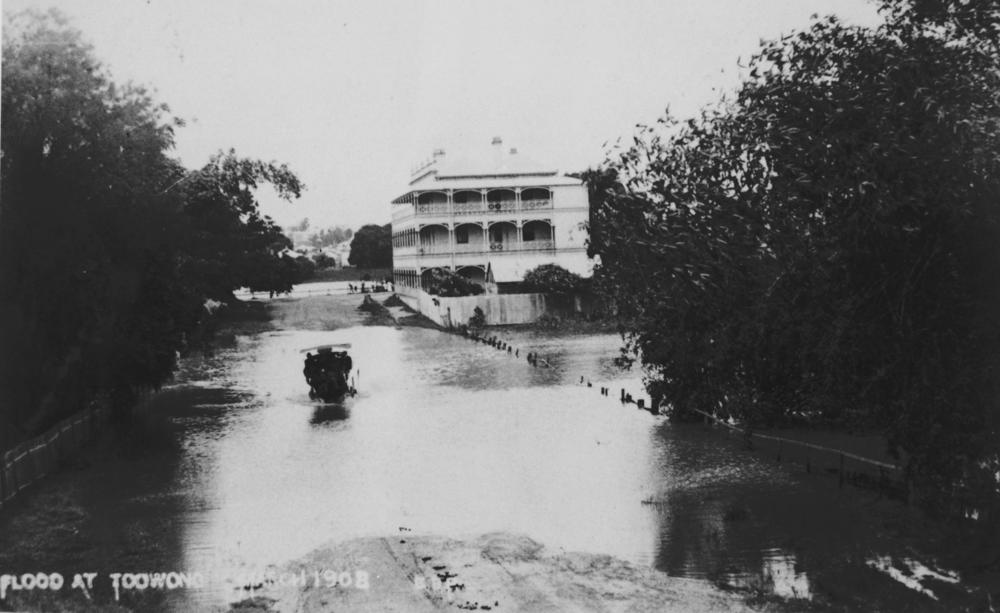
Flood water rising on Coronation Drive (then River Road) approaching the Regatta Hotel, March 1908

It was first flooded in 1887, then again in 1893. Lack of wider custom, the financial depression of the early 1890s, and the floods of 1893, nearly ruined Winterford. In 1897, he forfeited the Regatta to his mortgagees.

Ultimately, the Regatta survived and flourished through a number of owners and lessees.

A famous women's liberation protest took place in the public bar in 1965, when two women, Merle Thornton and Rosalie Bognor, chained themselves to the public bar footrail in protest at Queensland's restriction of being served drinks in public bars to men only. The protest was the starting point which led to the law being changed in Queensland in 1970. In 2014 the hotel celebrated the protest by renaming the bar at the hotel Merle's Bar. In 2009 as part of the Q150 celebrations, "All chained up for women's rights" was announced as one of the Q150 Icons of Queensland for its role as a "Defining Moment".

The hotel was refurbished in 1981 and then progressively renovated between 2001 and 2004. It was converted into several modern bars and nightclubs.

In the late 20th century, the Regatta attracted University of Queensland staff and students to its bars.

The Regatta Hotel was damaged during the 2010–2011 Queensland floods. $10 million was spent on renovations before an official reopening in September 2012.

== Description ==
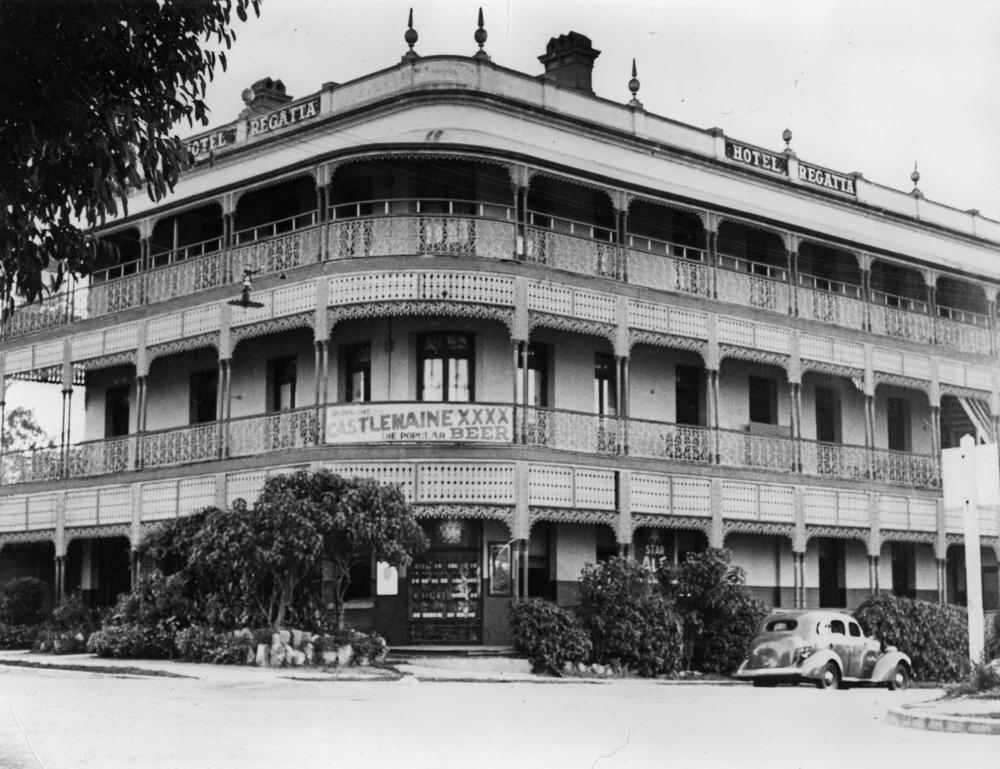
Regatta Hotel, circa 1940

[[File:Regatta Hotel back verandahs , Toowong, Queensland 02.JPG|thumb|Western elevation with fire stairs, 2014]] The Regatta Hotel, located on a prominent site adjacent to the Toowong Reach of the Brisbane River, is a brick building with hipped corrugated-iron roofs. Composed of three storeys and a basement, it is encircled by wide verandahs, except for a section on the southern side.

The street-facing, plastered facades feature an elaborate use of cast-iron balustrading railings on the balconies, paired cast-iron Corinthian columns, and friezes (decorative bands) crafted from cast iron and wood. At the very top of these facades—which curve along the street corners—sits a solid masonry parapet, adorned with finials (ornamental, spire-like elements) also made of masonry.

The more modest verandahs on the southern and western sides, now somewhat altered, have paired chamfered posts and brackets, and a continuation of the patterned timber frieze. A painted brick elevator shaft has been added to the southern elevation and a fire escape stair to the western elevation.

The ground floor, consisting of three bars, service areas and an entry foyer, has been refurbished. Original openings to the verandah have been replaced by sliding glass windows and doors. Sections of the verandah have been enclosed in brick to house toilet facilities. The entry foyer retains the original entry doors and arched openings. The unusual timber staircase located at the rear of the entry foyer runs in a single flight between floors, curving at the lower end of the flight.

Rooms on the first floor include a bar, a guest dining room, offices, kitchen, toilets and a guest suite. The bar, formerly a dining room, features a marble fireplace and a pair of curved French doors opening onto the northeast corner of the verandah. The manager's residence and guest accommodation occupy the second floor.

The interiors of the first and second floors retain original finishes including pressed metal ceilings and plastered masonry walls ornamented by arches and mouldings. Panelled timber doors with fanlights open off the central hallway. French doors with fanlights lead from the bedrooms and principal public areas to the verandahs.

Parts of the first-floor northern and western verandahs have been enclosed with glass walls. The Regatta Hotel retains a substantially intact exterior and a visual prominence along the Toowong Reach of the Brisbane River.

The Heritage Bar on the ground floor features leather lounges and a large fireplace.

== Heritage listings ==
The Regatta Hotel is classified by the National Trust of Queensland and was entered into the Register of the National Estate.

Regatta Hotel was listed on the Queensland Heritage Register on 21 October 1992 having satisfied the following criteria.

The place is important in demonstrating the evolution or pattern of Queensland's history.

The Regatta Hotel is important in demonstrating the evolution of Queensland's history, being evidence of the optimism and exuberance of the 1880s economic boom and evidence of the former use of this part of the Brisbane River for sporting and recreational activities.

The place is important in demonstrating the principal characteristics of a particular class of cultural places.

It is important in demonstrating the principal characteristics of a large, ornate 1880s hotel which remains substantially intact.

The place is important because of its aesthetic significance.

It exhibits aesthetic characteristics valued by the community, being a prominent landmark contributing to the riverscape along the Toowong Reach of the Brisbane River.

The place has a special association with the life or work of a particular person, group or organisation of importance in Queensland's history.

The Regatta Hotel has a special association with the work of architect Richard Gailey, being one of a group of large 1880s hotels designed by him, which contribute to the architectural character of Brisbane through their imposing presence, extensive use of cast-iron and classical detailing.

== Gallery ==
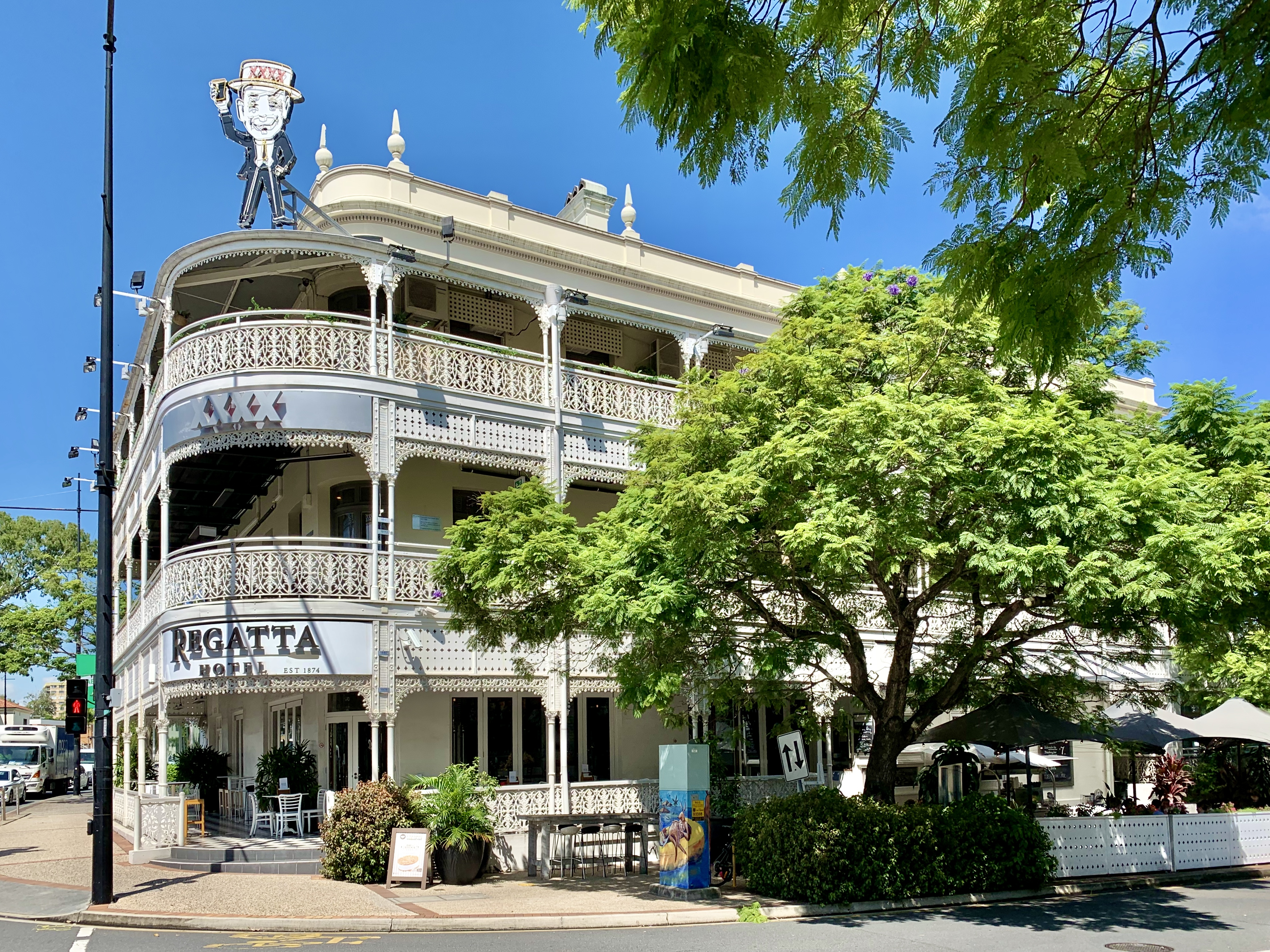
Regatta facade as seen from Sylvan Rd

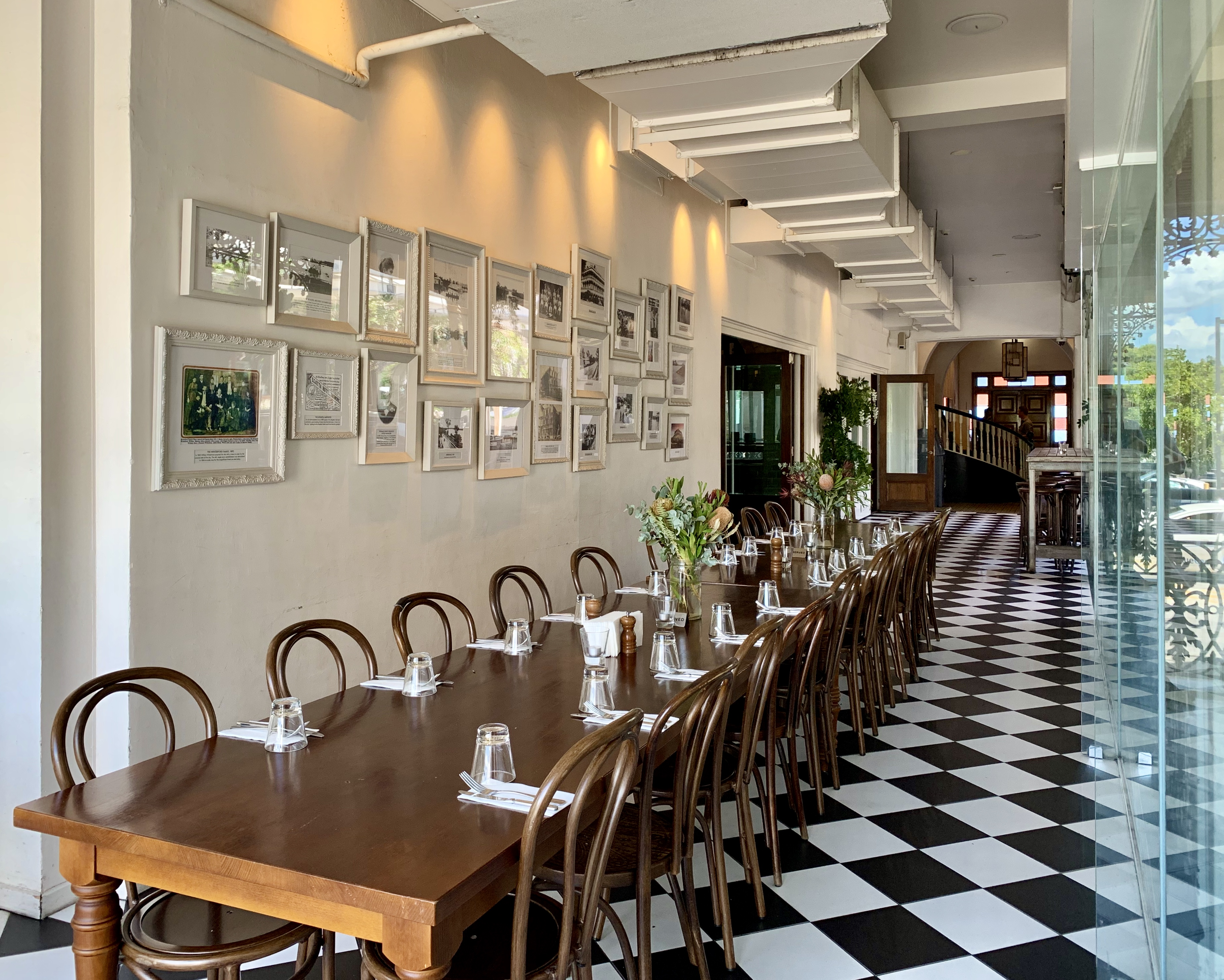
Regatta function room

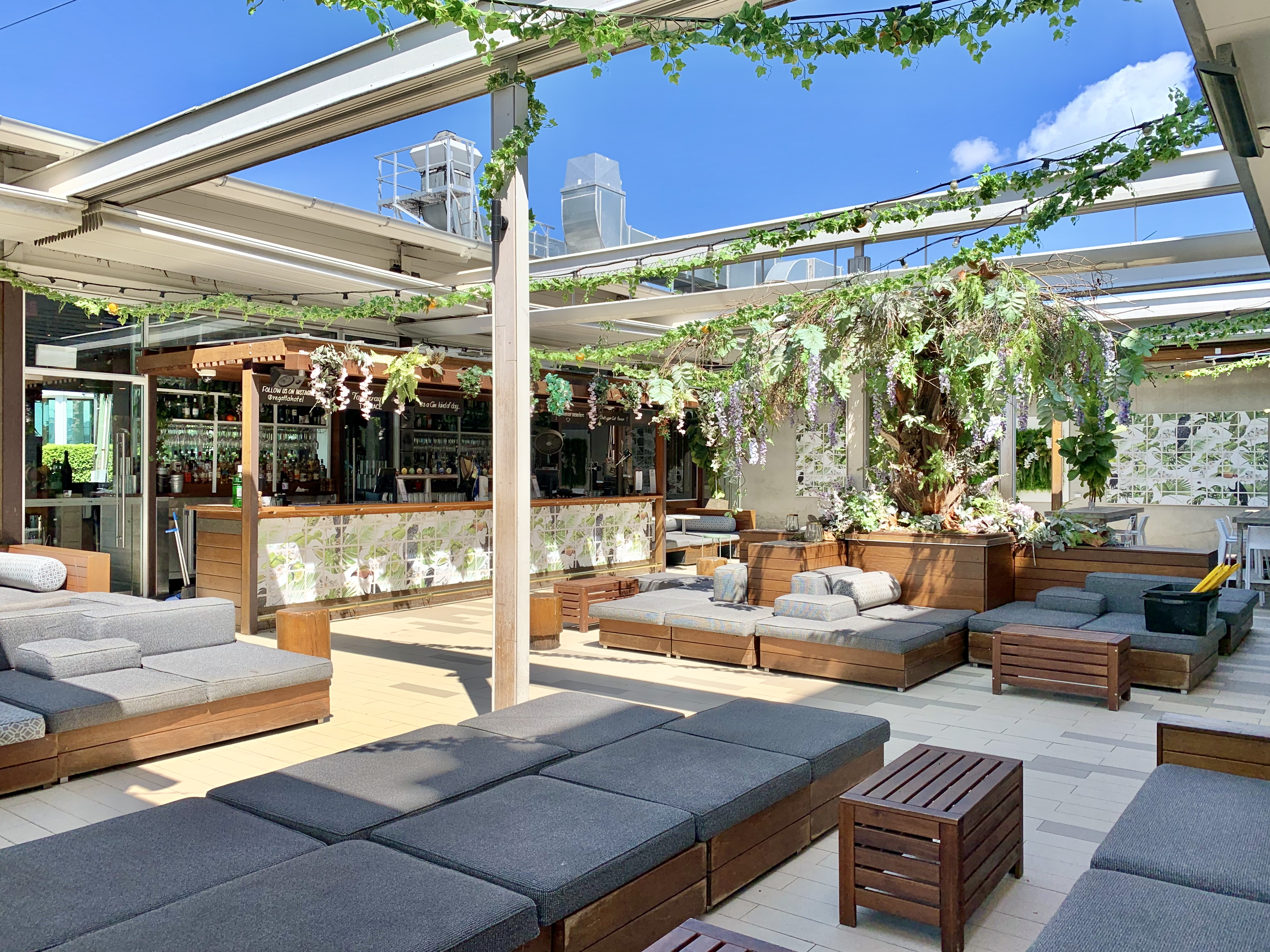
The Courtyard

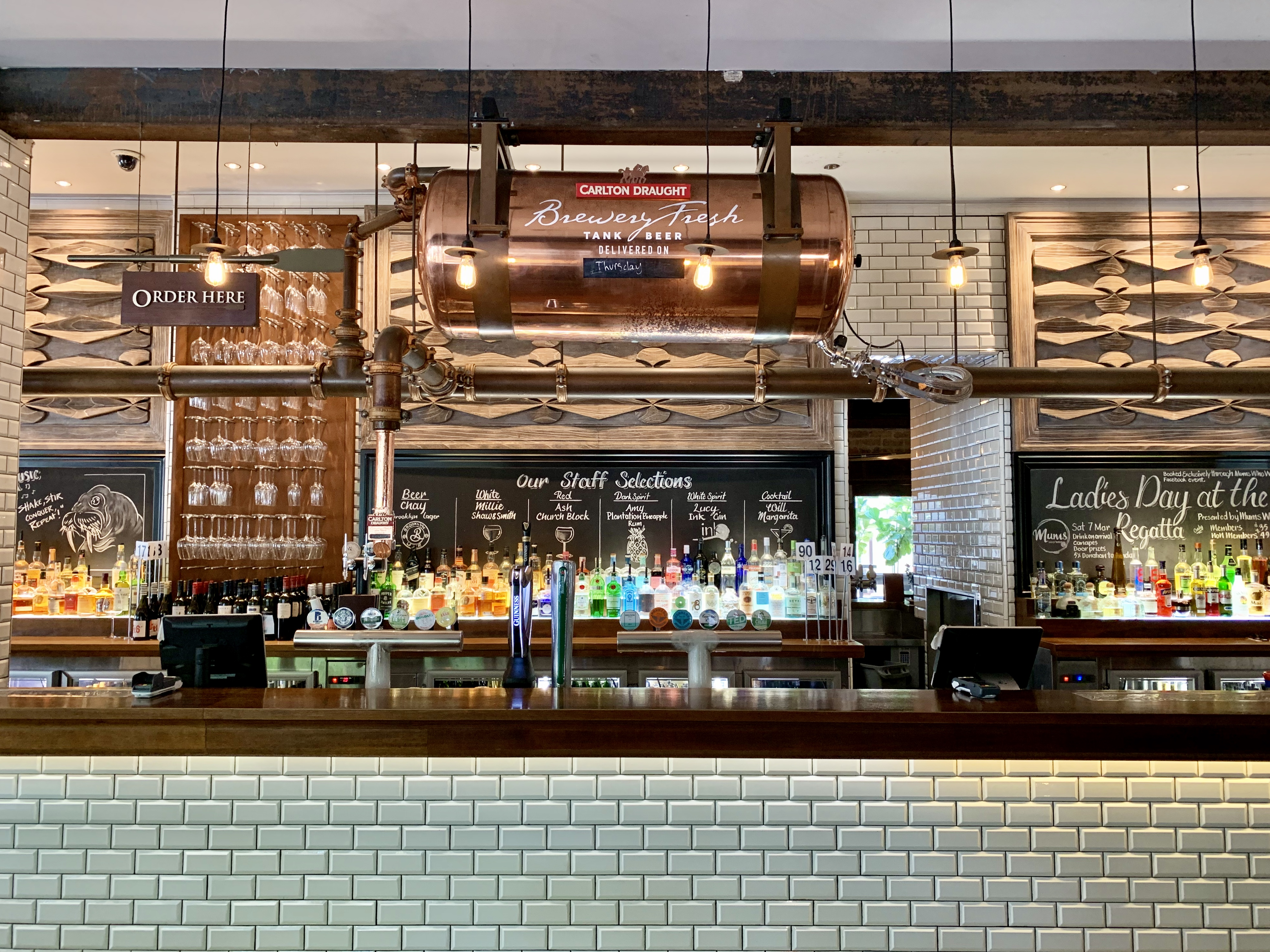
Main Bar

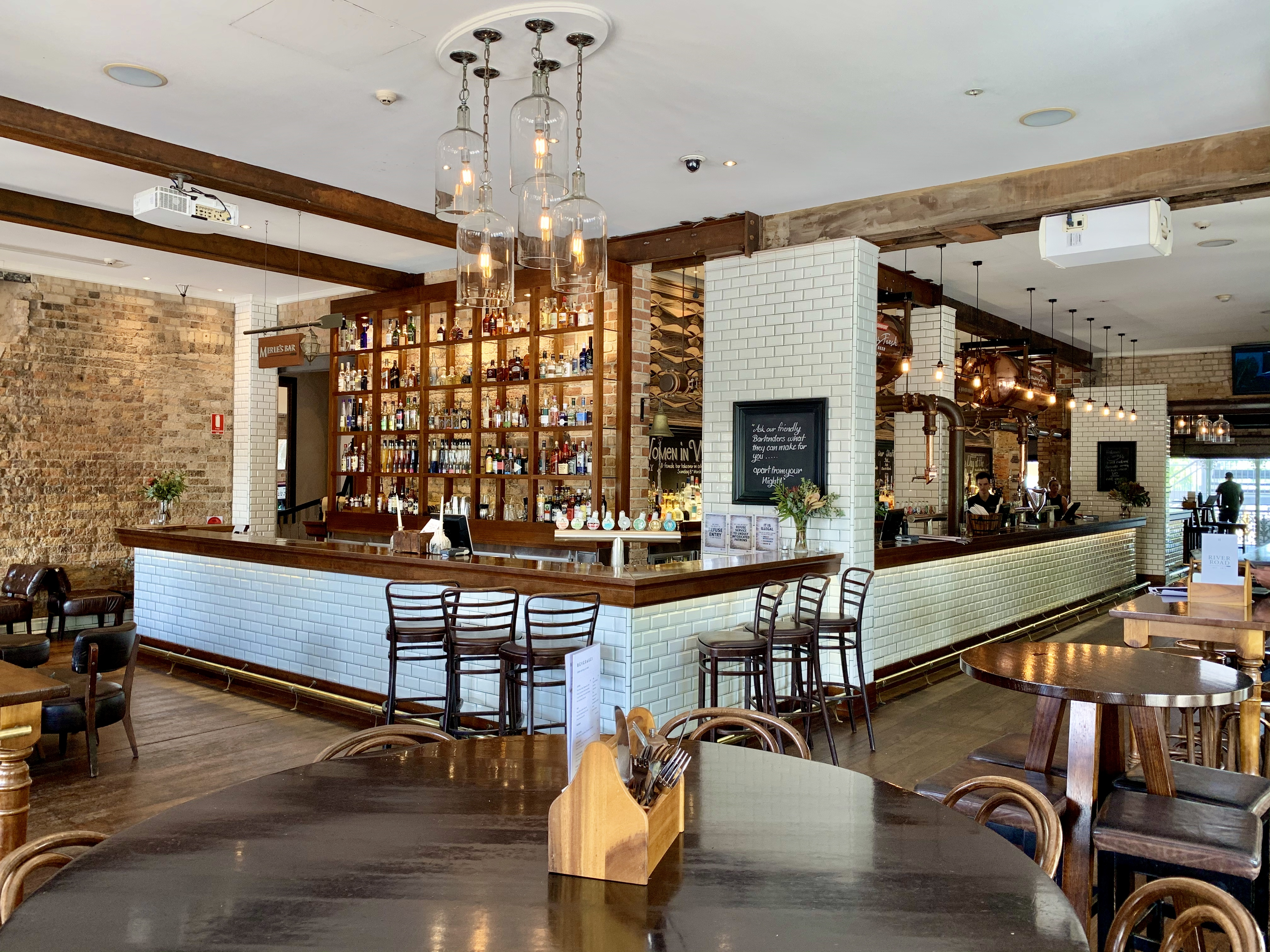
Merle's Bar

== See also ==
- Regatta ferry wharf
- List of public houses in Australia
