= John Daniel Heal =

Australian politician

John Heal
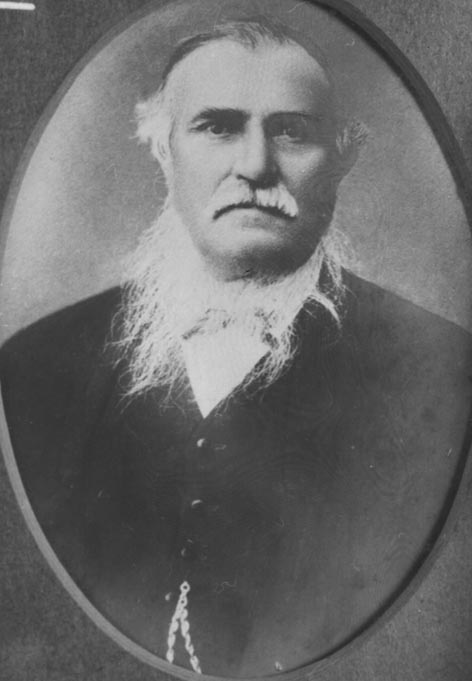

14th Mayor of Brisbane
- In office 1879–1879
- Preceded by: Alfred Hubbard
- Succeeded by: John Sinclair

Personal details
- Born: John Daniel Heal; 18 January 1825 Turleigh, Wiltshire, England
- Died: 18 August 1908 (aged 83) Brisbane, Queensland, Australia
- Resting place: Toowong Cemetery
- Spouse(s): Elizabeth Scriven (m.1852 d.1863), Harriet Street (m.1863 d.1872)
- Occupation: Publican

John Daniel Heal (1825–1908) was an alderman and mayor of Brisbane, Australia.

== Private life ==
John Daniel Heal was born in Turleigh (spelt Turley at the time) near Bradford-on-Avon, England on 18 January 1825, and was baptised in the parish church, St Nicholas', Winsley on 17 April 1825. He was the son of Ambrose Heal(e) ('Mason of Turley') and Elizabeth Smith. He emigrated from England to Brisbane in mid-1856.

His first wife is unknown.

He married his second wife Elizabeth Scriven (born 1830, Wootton Rivers, England), daughter of William and Harriott Scriven, on 18 December 1852 in St Mary's Church, Marlborough. They had a number of children, including:

- a son, John Heal, born 10 February 1859, married Nora(h) Mahon(e)y 31 January 1880, died 4 December 1935.

Elizabeth died in Brisbane on 8 June 1863.

He married his third wife Harriet Street, the daughter of John Street and Martha Wallace, on 15 August 1863 in Brisbane and they had the following children:

- a daughter, Harriet Emily, born 26 April 1864
- a daughter, Elizabeth Annie (Lizzie), born 14 December 1865
- a son, Alfred George, born 22 April 1868 and died 15 June 1890 aged 22 years
- a daughter, Edith Lydia Grace, born 22 October 1870 and died 4 August 1882 aged 11 years 9 months
- a son, Ernest Edward, born 16 Nov 1872 and died on 26 Dec 1872 aged 5 weeks and 5 days

His wife Harriet died 11 December 1872 aged 28 years, possibly from complications of childbirth.

In 1903, John Heal was living in retirement with his unmarried daughter Lizzie at his residence, Bath Villa, 555 Leichhardt Street, Fortitude Valley.

John Daniel Heal died in Brisbane on 18 August 1908. He was buried in Toowong Cemetery but the grave has now been demolished.

== Business life ==
In Brisbane, John Daniel Heal worked at his trade as a stonemason.

In 1863, he leased the Prince Consort Hotel in Wickham Street, Fortitude Valley and became a publican. He bought the hotel in 1879 and by 1887 had acquired a number of adjoining properties. In 1887–1888, Heal tore down the old hotel and had a larger hotel erected, the now heritage-listed Prince Consort Hotel which was designed by Richard Gailey, a well-known Brisbane architect. When completed, the new hotel had one of the largest bars in Brisbane, three parlours, a large dining room, billiard room, kitchen, cellar, six bathrooms, twenty-eight bedrooms with four large shops on the ground floor.

He became a major contractor and prominent businessman in Brisbane.

== Public life ==
He was very involved in community affairs and was a great advocate for the progress of Fortitude Valley. In 1870 he was elected to the Brisbane Council as an alderman for the Fortitude Valley Ward. He served his electorate in this role from 1870 to 1873, losing to Nicholas Corrigan in 1874. However, the following year, Heal won the ward of Fortitude Valley back (Corrigan did not stand for election) and held it until 1894, after which he did not seek re-election. He was mayor in 1879. He served on the following committees:

- Bridge Committee 1870
- Lighting Committee 1870
- Improvement Committee 1870, 1872, 1875, 1876, 1878–1880
- Finance Committee 1871, 1873, 1877, 1881, 1883, 1884, 1886, 1888, 1890, 1892, 1893
- Legislative Committee 1871, 1872, 1878, 1882, 1885, 1888, 1892
- Works Committee 1882, 1885, 1887, 1889, 1891, 1894
- Health Committee 1884, 1886, 1887, 1890, 1891, 1893
- Town Hall Committee 1885, 1886
- Street Lighting Committee 1892

Heal Street in New Farm was named after him. He is also mentioned on a monument in Brisbane commemorating the heroic acts of a fireman who died in the line of duty while he was mayor.
