= Wickham Hotel =

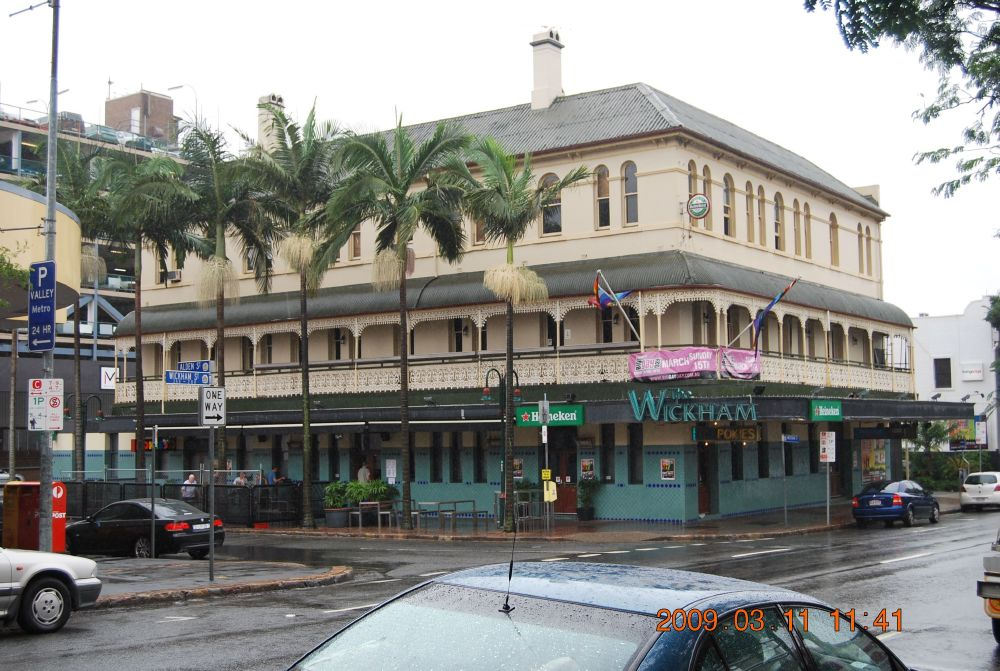
- Wickham Hotel, 2009

- Location within Queensland Location within Australia
- 27.456°S 153.0348°E
- Location: 308 Wickham Street, Fortitude Valley, City of Brisbane, Queensland, Australia

History
- Design period: 1870s–1890s (late 19th century)
- Built: 1885
- Built for: Timothy O'Shea

Site notes
- Architect: Richard Gailey
- Architectural style: Classicism

Queensland Heritage Register
- Official name: Wickham Hotel
- Type: state heritage (built)
- Designated: 21 October 1992
- Reference no.: 600213
- Significant period: 1880s (fabric); 1885–ongoing (historical, use as hotel)
- Significant components: cellar
- Builders: Cussack & O'Keefe

Wickham Hotel is a heritage-listed hotel at 308 Wickham Street, Fortitude Valley, City of Brisbane, Queensland, Australia. Originally trading as the Oriental, it was designed by Richard Gailey and built in 1885 by Cussack & O'Keefe. It was added to the Queensland Heritage Register on 21 October 1992.

== History ==
The Wickham Hotel is a three-storeyed masonry hotel, constructed by the firm Cussack and O'Keefe in 1885 for Timothy O'Shea who had amalgamated a number of blocks in 1881.

The design was by architect Richard Gailey who was also responsible for the design of several other hotels in Brisbane during the 1880s. These included the Regatta at Toowong, and the Prince Consort Hotel, Empire and Jubilee in Fortitude Valley.

It was bought in 1895 by Denis O'Connor who owned it until his death in 1937. In 1972 it was sold to Carlton & United Breweries. For most of its existence, the Wickham Hotel has been leased to licensees. The hotel has undergone a number of modifications primarily on the ground floor. Single storeyed extensions have been built on the north-east and north-west sides, and a drive-in bottle shop was at one stage located at the hotel

From 1996 the Wickham attracted members of the LGBTI community and was known to be gay-friendly. Mark Alsop was a resident DJ between 1997 and 1999. In 2014, it was renovated, re-opened and rebranded to attract a wider range of clientele, with the former car park being turned into an outdoor laneway type of space. The upstairs balcony was opened to patrons.

== Description ==
The Wickham Hotel, a three-storeyed rendered brick building with basement, is located on the corner of Wickham, Ballow and Alden Streets.

An awning with pressed metal ceilings cantilevers over the footpath on the main facades facing Wickham and Ballow Streets. Below the awning the external wall of the ground floor is finished with mosaic tiles, now painted. The walls above the awning are rendered and lined to suggest stonework and are embellished by horizontal bands at the sill and impost levels of the windows.

The ground floor has rectangular timber sash windows. Windows on the first and second floors are arranged in an alternating pattern of paired narrow arched windows and wider single arched windows. A timber-framed verandah projects from the first floor. It has a rolled corrugated iron roof and ornamental cast-iron balustrade, posts, post brackets and frieze. The building has painted corrugated iron hip roofs with narrow overhangs supported on paired modillions. Three rendered chimney stacks are located along the ridges of the roof.

An L-shaped verandah is located on the northern corner of the first and second floors at the rear of the building. This verandah is enclosed on the north-western side by a three-storeyed painted brick extension housing bathrooms. Timber posts, balustrade, brackets and boarded frieze remain on the north east.

Five sets of timber double doors provide entry from the street. The main entry, located on the Wickham Street facade, opens to a foyer which has a richly embellished plaster ceiling and cornice and contains a generously proportioned timber stair leading to the first floor. The remainder of the ground floor has been refurbished and is occupied by bars, service areas and a bottle shop.

Except for a bar located in the southern corner of the first floor, the first and second floors are used for accommodation. The main stair leads only to the first floor. It is connected by an L-shaped corridor to a narrow timber stair that runs between first and second floors. Internally the first and second floor retain much of the original fabric including rendered masonry walls, plaster cornices and skirtings. Timber doors with transom lights open off the central hallway while doors leading to the verandah are half glazed with fanlights above.

The finishes and detail of the facade and much of the interior of the ground floor have been altered. The rest of the building remains largely unchanged.

== Heritage listing ==
Wickham Hotel was listed on the Queensland Heritage Register on 21 October 1992 having satisfied the following criteria.

The place is important in demonstrating the evolution or pattern of Queensland's history.

The Wickham Hotel is associated with a major phase in the development of Fortitude Valley.

The place is important in demonstrating the principal characteristics of a particular class of cultural places.

The Wickham Hotel is an example of a large 1880s three-storeyed hotel with intact, cantilevered single storey verandah and contributes to the Wickham Street streetscape.

The place is important because of its aesthetic significance.

The Wickham Hotel is an example of a large 1880s three-storeyed hotel with intact, cantilevered single storey verandah and contributes to the Wickham Street streetscape.

The place has a special association with the life or work of a particular person, group or organisation of importance in Queensland's history.

The building is one of a group of hotels designed by architect Richard Gailey which contribute to the architectural character of Brisbane through their imposing presence, extensive use of ornamental cast-iron and classical detailing.
