= Richard Gailey =

Irish-born Australian architect

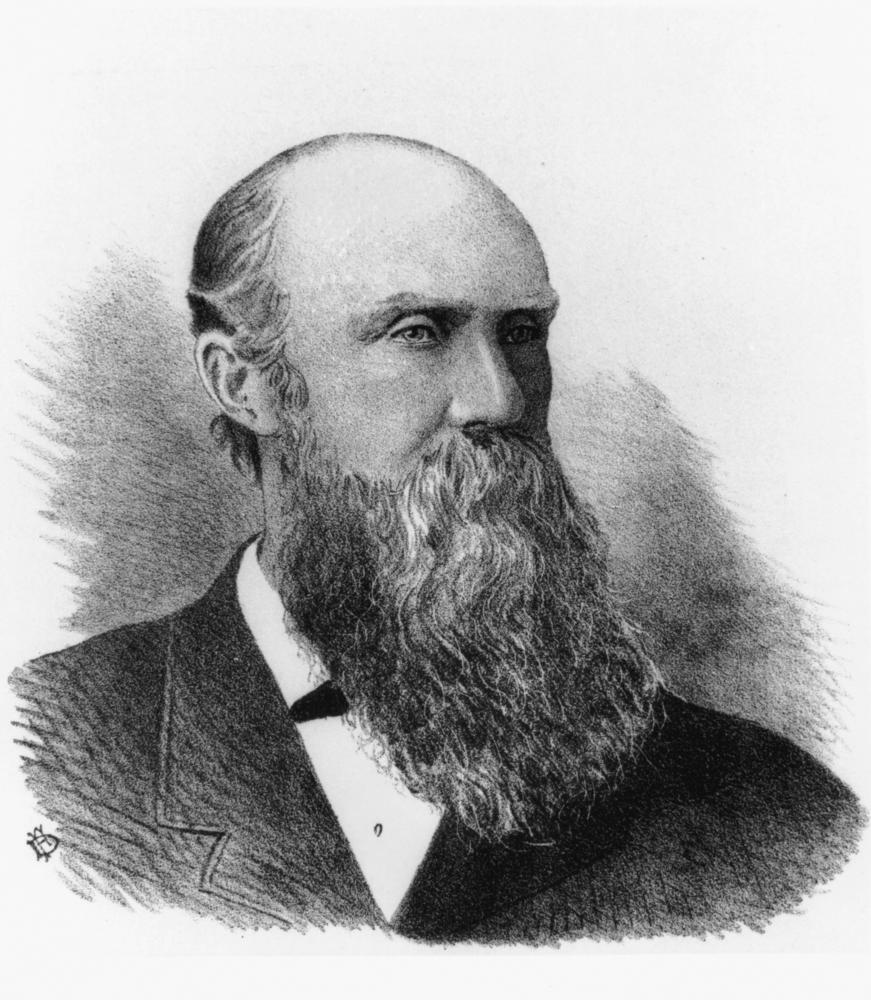
- Richard Gailey (1834–1924)
- Born: 22 April 1834; County Donegal, Ireland
- Died: 24 April 1924 (aged 90); Brisbane, Australia
- Occupation: Architect
- Buildings: Brisbane Girls Grammar School

Richard Gailey, Sr. (22 April 1834 – 24 April 1924) was an Irish-born Australian architect.

Gailey was born in County Donegal, Ireland and emigrated to Australia in 1864, becoming an influential and prolific architect in colonial-era Brisbane. He died in Brisbane on 24 April 1924, two days after his ninetieth birthday, and is buried in Cleveland Cemetery along with his wife Mary, née Rice.

== Body of work ==
His substantial body of work includes many commercial and residential buildings in Brisbane that today are considered colonial treasures. Some of these include:

- Wickham Hotel at Fortitude Valley (1885)
- Regatta Hotel at Toowong (1886)
- Jubilee Hotel at Fortitude Valley (1887)
- Watson Brothers Building in Brisbane City (1887)
- Sandgate Baptist Church (1887)
- Prince Consort Hotel at Fortitude Valley (1888)
- Moorlands at Auchenflower (1892)
- Brisbane Girl's Grammar School at Spring Hill
- Empire Hotel in Fortitude Valley
- Orient Hotel in Queen Street (formerly the Excelsior)
- Oddfellows Hall at Fortitude Valley
- Baroona Labor Hall in Caxton Street
- Musgrave House at Shorncliffe
- Masonic Hall at Toowong
- Sandgate Town Hall
- Windermere, 14 Sutherland Avenue Ascot
- Thomas Dixon Centre (Previously Thomas Dixon Company -Bootmaker) - West End

In addition to his architectural work, Gailey was also a licensed surveyor and responsible for surveying and laying out the town of Bowen.

== Characteristics of Gailey's work ==
Gailey's work combines the practical value in a sub-tropical environment of high-thermal mass masonry walls with the aesthetic value of finely detailed arches creating a wide veranda to shade the load-bearing walls from the sun during the hottest part of the day. This is best seen in the Brisbane Girls Grammar School.

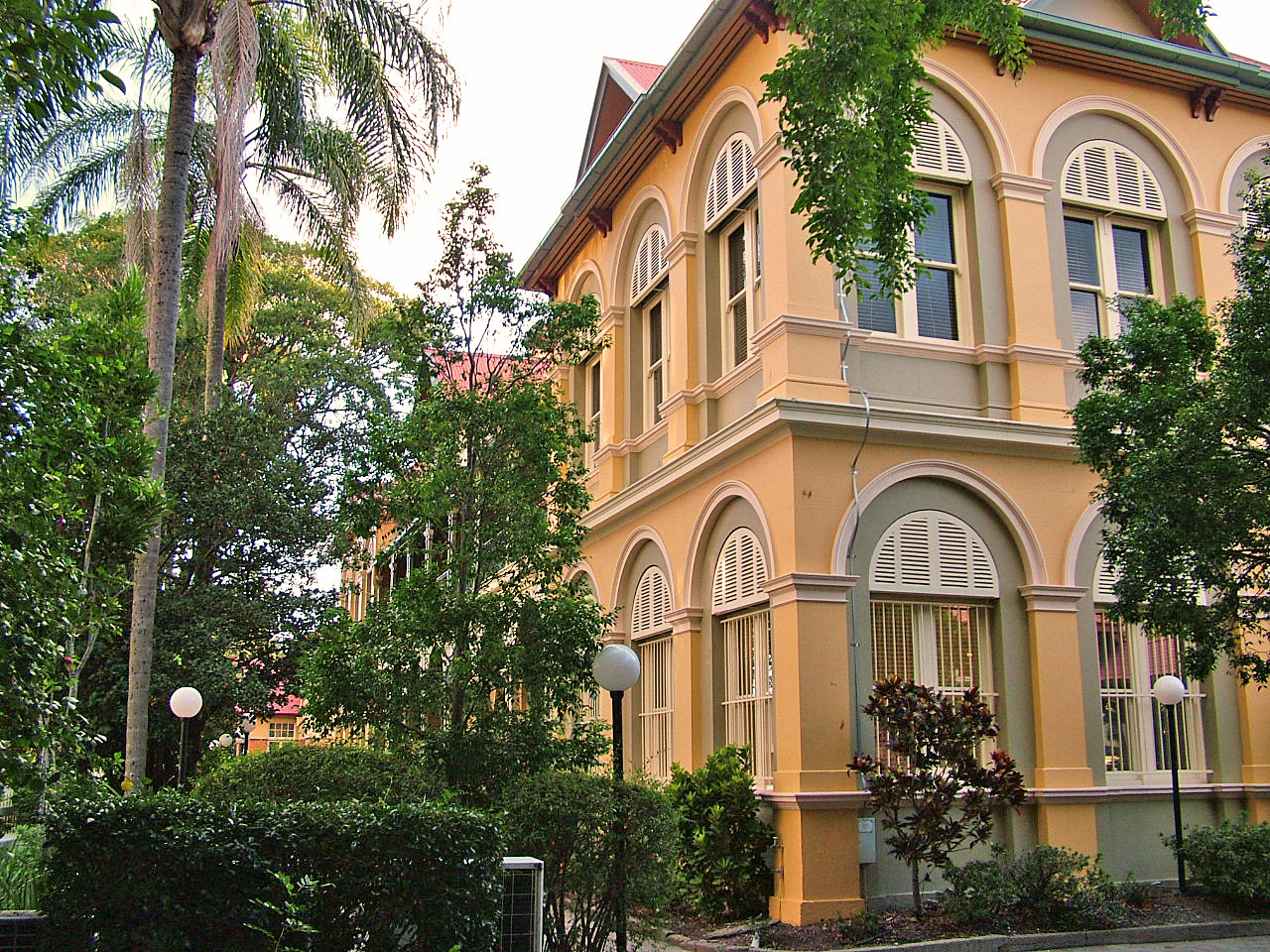
Brisbane Girls Grammar School Main Bldg, Spring Hill, 2011.

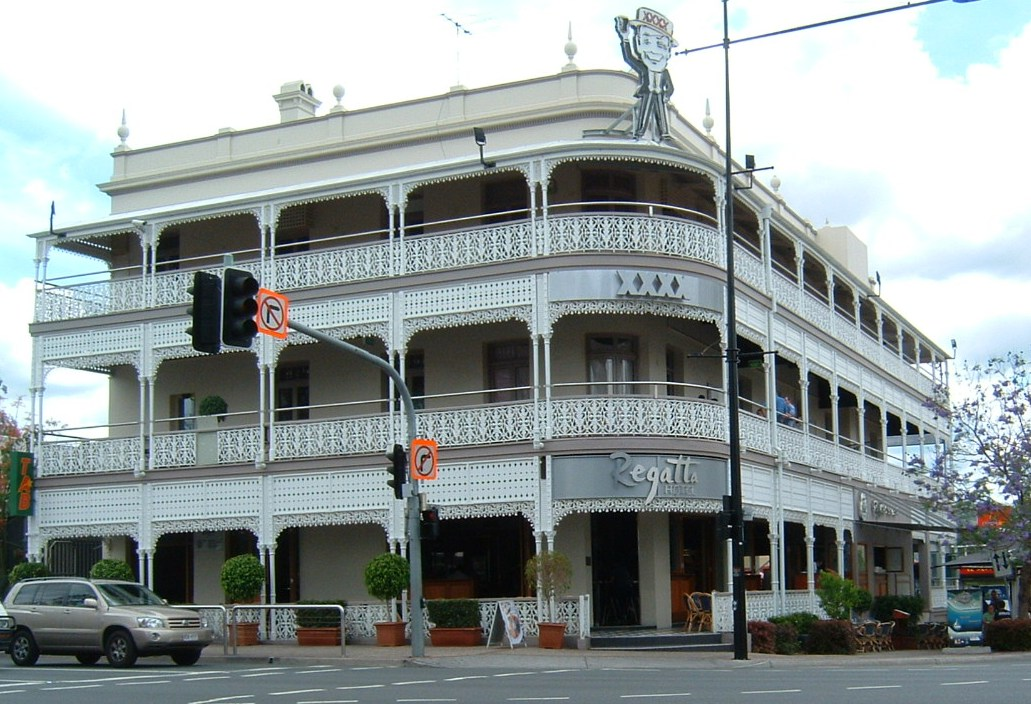
Regatta Hotel

A cost-reducing alternative to masonry arches is seen in commercial buildings like the Regatta Hotel. The wrought-iron filigree lacework replaces the masonry arches of the outer veranda. This elegant and practical approach has become known as Queenslander architecture. Its use became widespread in early Queensland residential properties of substance.

== Gailey Road, Taringa ==
Richard Gailey owned property in the area that came to be known as Taringa. His name is commemorated in Gailey Road.

== See also ==
- Category:Richard Gailey buildings for his works
