= Prince Consort Hotel =

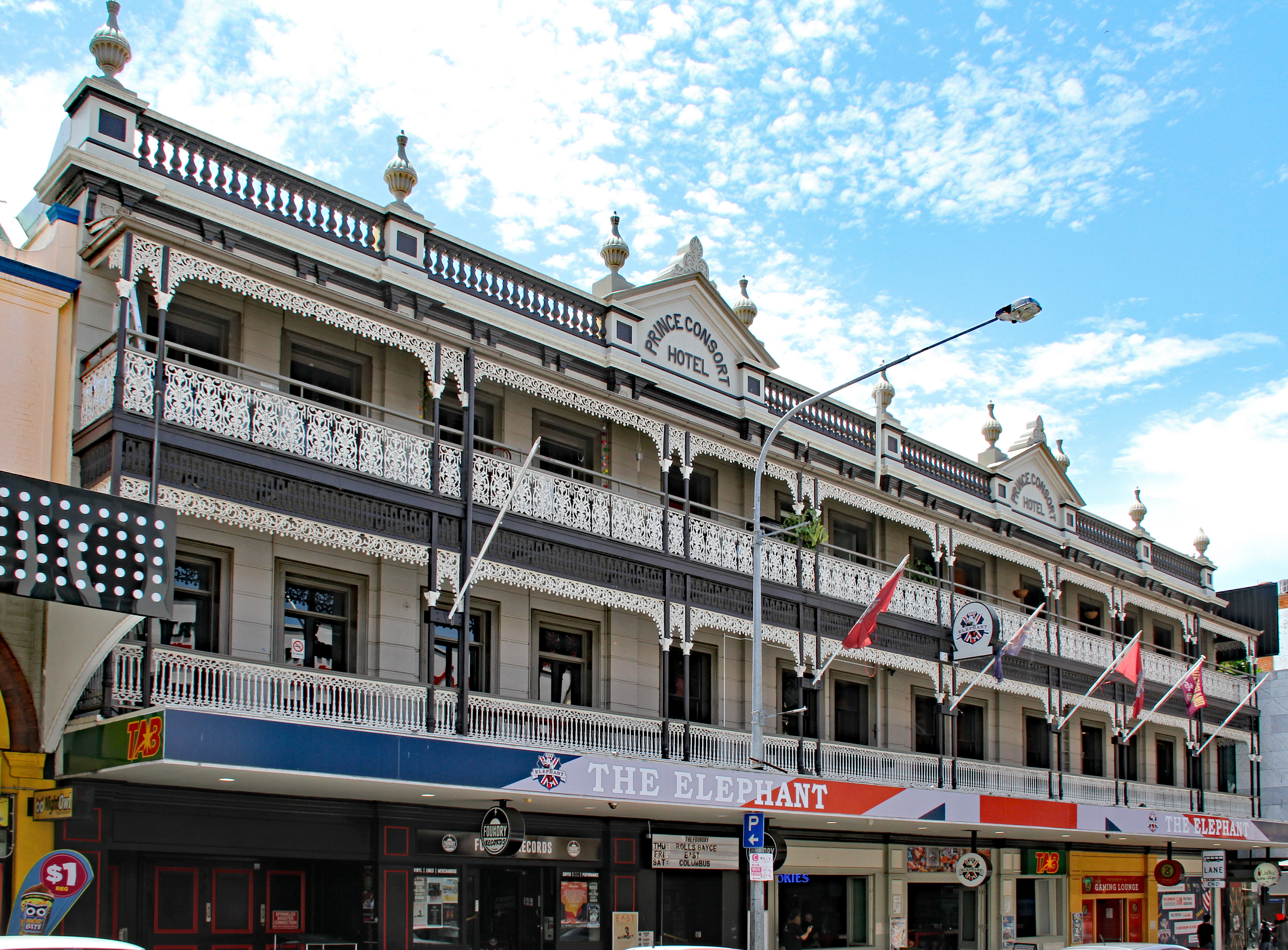
- Prince Consort Hotel façade

- Location within Queensland Location within Australia
- 27.4575°S 153.0332°E
- Location: 230 Wickham Street, Fortitude Valley, City of Brisbane, Queensland, Australia

History
- Design period: 1870s–1890s (late 19th century)
- Built: 1887–1888 (with extensions in 1932)
- Built for: John Daniel Heal

Site notes
- Architect: Richard Gailey

Queensland Heritage Register
- Official name: Prince Consort Hotel
- Type: state heritage (built)
- Designated: 21 October 1992
- Reference no.: 600212
- Significant period: 1887–c. 1942 (fabric); 1888–ongoing (historical – use as Hotel)
- Significant components: air raid shelter, shop/s, cellar

Prince Consort Hotel is a heritage-listed hotel at 230 Wickham Street, Fortitude Valley, City of Brisbane, Queensland, Australia. It was designed by Richard Gailey and built from 1887 to 1888 with later extensions. It was added to the Queensland Heritage Register on 21 October 1992. In 2014, it is trading as the Elephant Hotel.

== History ==
The present Prince Consort Hotel, a three-storeyed masonry building, was erected in 1887–1888 for Brisbane publican John Daniel Heal. David Thomson and his wife Mary ran the hotel for a period in the 1890s.

It was the second Prince Consort Hotel to occupy the site. The first was built c.1863 and leased by Heal. In 1879 Heal purchased the hotel and by 1887 he had acquired several adjoining subdivisions as well. The old building was demolished and its larger replacement took twelve months to build.

The new Prince Consort Hotel was designed by architect Richard Gailey, who called tenders in mid-1887.

It was erected by contractor William Ferguson at a cost of £9,400, and was completed in August 1888. Ferguson died before the hotel was finished, but the contract was completed by his executors.

Its construction in the 1880s reflected the general building boom in Queensland which accompanied a period of unprecedented economic growth. During the second half of the 1880s, Valley residents witnessed the construction of four large hotels all designed by architect Richard Gailey. The Wickham Hotel (1885), the Empire Hotel (1887), the Jubilee Hotel (1887) and the Prince Consort contained extensive accommodation and were located on prominent sites. Gailey also designed the Regatta Hotel at Toowong in 1886.

When completed, the new Prince Consort boasted one of the largest bars in Brisbane, three parlours, a large dining room, billiard room, kitchen, cellar, six bathrooms and twenty-eight bedrooms. Four large shops were also built on the ground floor.

Running the whole length of the first floor facade was a reception area, known as the Club Room, divided by a folding partition into two rooms. It was a regular meeting venue for local Valley groups such as lodges.

In 1935 the hotel underwent alterations and additions, the architect was John Patrick Donoghue and the contractor J Corbett. The hotel's curved, post-supported awning was probably replaced with the flat cantilevered awning at this time.

== Description ==
The hotel consists of two, three storey, masonry buildings connected by timber verandahs.

The principal range along Wickham Street is rendered to resemble ashlar. It has balconies to the two upper floors with cast iron twin posts, and balustrades and friezes of differing designs to each floor. The upper balcony has a curved galvanised iron roof below a corbelled and bracketed string course, a rendered parapet with two triangular pediments, and concrete balusters and urns. French doors with fanlights, between pilasters, open onto the balconies. Changes to the street elevation have been confined to the ground floor shopfronts and the replacement of the original curved, post-supported awning with a flat cantilevered awning.

The second building at the rear, is at right angles to the main building. The two buildings are connected by verandahs, which although partially enclosed contain much of the original fabric including timber railings and valances.

A number of small accretions have been built at the rear of the building. In the yard behind the building is a large air raid shelter now used as a store room.

Internally the hotel retains its original layout and much of its 1880s detailing and finishes. The basement under the main building has openings knocked through the walls. The bars on the ground floor have been renovated a number of times. The main staircase is intact, as are plasterwork and joinery.

== Heritage listing ==
Prince Consort Hotel was listed on the Queensland Heritage Register on 21 October 1992 having satisfied the following criteria.

The place is important in demonstrating the evolution or pattern of Queensland's history.

Erected during a period of rapid growth in the development of Fortitude Valley, the Prince Consort Hotel is significant as an excellent and intact example of a large, ornate hotel constructed in the late 1880s.

The place is important in demonstrating the principal characteristics of a particular class of cultural places.

Erected during a period of rapid growth in the development of Fortitude Valley, the Prince Consort Hotel is significant as an excellent and intact example of a large, ornate hotel constructed in the late 1880s.

The place is important because of its aesthetic significance.

The Prince Consort Hotel contributes to the Wickham Street streetscape, and is significant as one of a group of hotels designed by architect Richard Gailey which contribute to the architectural character of Brisbane through their imposing presence, extensive use of ornamental cast-iron and classical detailing.

The place has a special association with the life or work of a particular person, group or organisation of importance in Queensland's history.

The Prince Consort Hotel contributes to the Wickham Street streetscape, and is significant as one of a group of hotels designed by architect Richard Gailey which contribute to the architectural character of Brisbane through their imposing presence, extensive use of ornamental cast-iron and classical detailing.
