= Empire Hotel, Fortitude Valley =

Empire Hotel
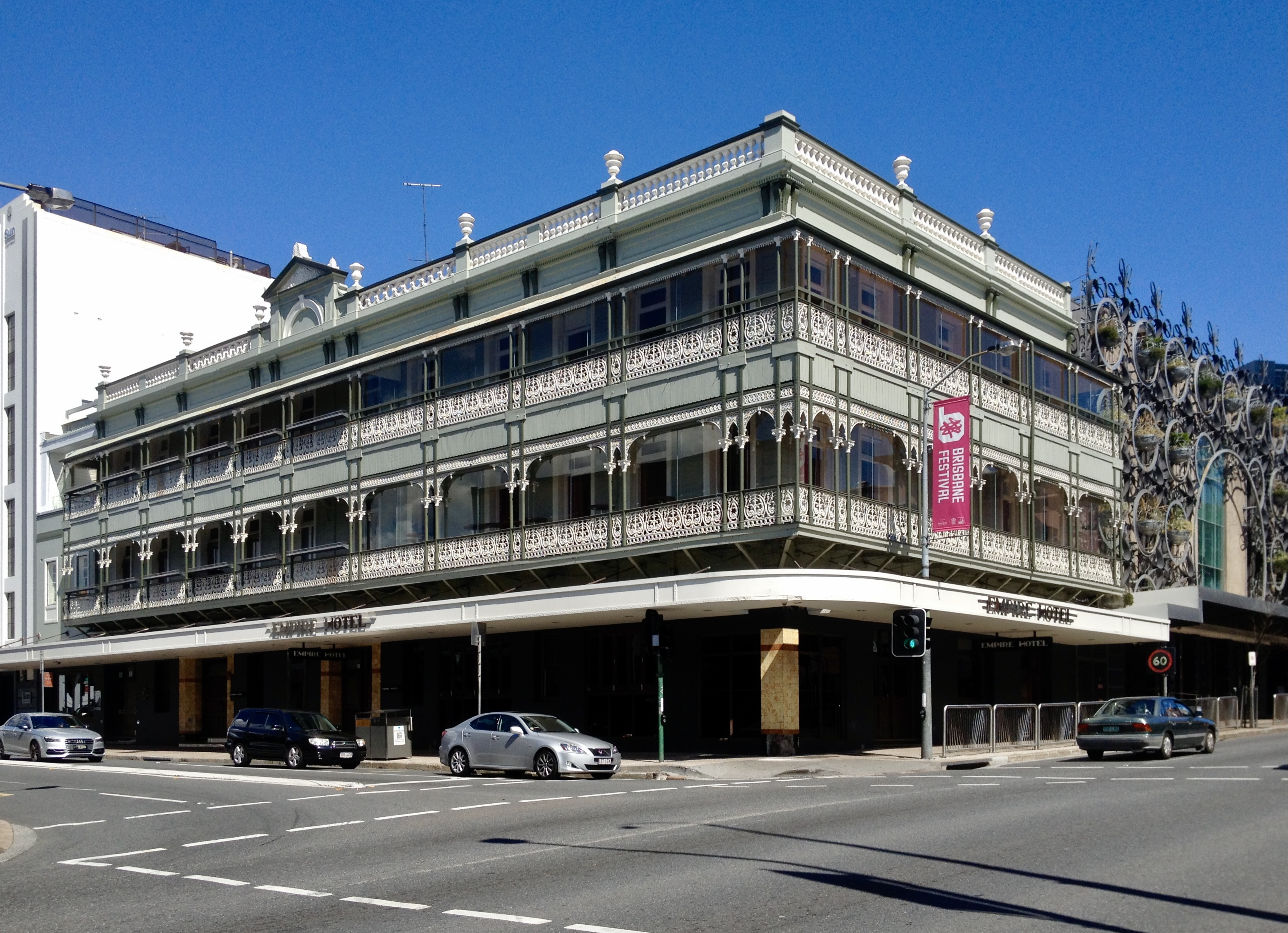
- Empire Hotel, 2014

- Location within Queensland Location within Australia
- 27.4588°S 153.0351°E
- Location: 339 Brunswick Street, Fortitude Valley, City of Brisbane, Queensland, Australia

History
- Design period: 1870s–1890s (late 19th century)
- Built: 1888, 1925, 1937

Site notes
- Architect(s): Richard Gailey, Richard Gailey, Junior, Hall and Phillips
- Architectural style: Victorian Filigree

Queensland Heritage Register
- Official name: Empire Hotel
- Type: state heritage (built)
- Designated: 21 October 1992
- Reference no.: 600199
- Significant period: 1888–1937 (fabric); 1888–ongoing (historical use)
- Significant components: elevator, cellar, toilet block/earth closet/water closet
- Builders: Smith and Ball

Empire Hotel is a heritage-listed hotel at 339 Brunswick Street, Fortitude Valley, City of Brisbane, Queensland, Australia. It was designed by Richard Gailey and built in 1888 by Smith and Ball. It was renovated in 1925 to a design by Richard Gailey, Junior. It was further renovated in 1937 to incorporate apartments designed by Hall and Phillips. It was added to the Queensland Heritage Register on 21 October 1992.

== History ==
This three-storeyed, rendered brick hotel was erected in 1888 for Nathaniel Corrigan. It replaced an earlier Empire (Family) Hotel (1865) which had been bought by Corrigan on 19 June 1871 for £950.

The new hotel was designed by prominent architect Richard Gailey who also designed the nearby Prince Consort Hotel, Wickham Hotel and Jubilee Hotel. The construction of these hotels in the late 1880s reflected the confidence of the period and development that occurred in Fortitude Valley.

The Empire was constructed by Smith and Ball Contractors and the first publican was Walter McFarlane. The hotel extended 130 feet (40 m) along Ann Street and 120 feet (37 m) along Brunswick Street, and contained over sixty rooms.

In February 1923, following the death of Nathaniel Corrigan, the hotel and adjoining buildings were sold to Messrs Perkins & Co (brewers) for about £40,000.

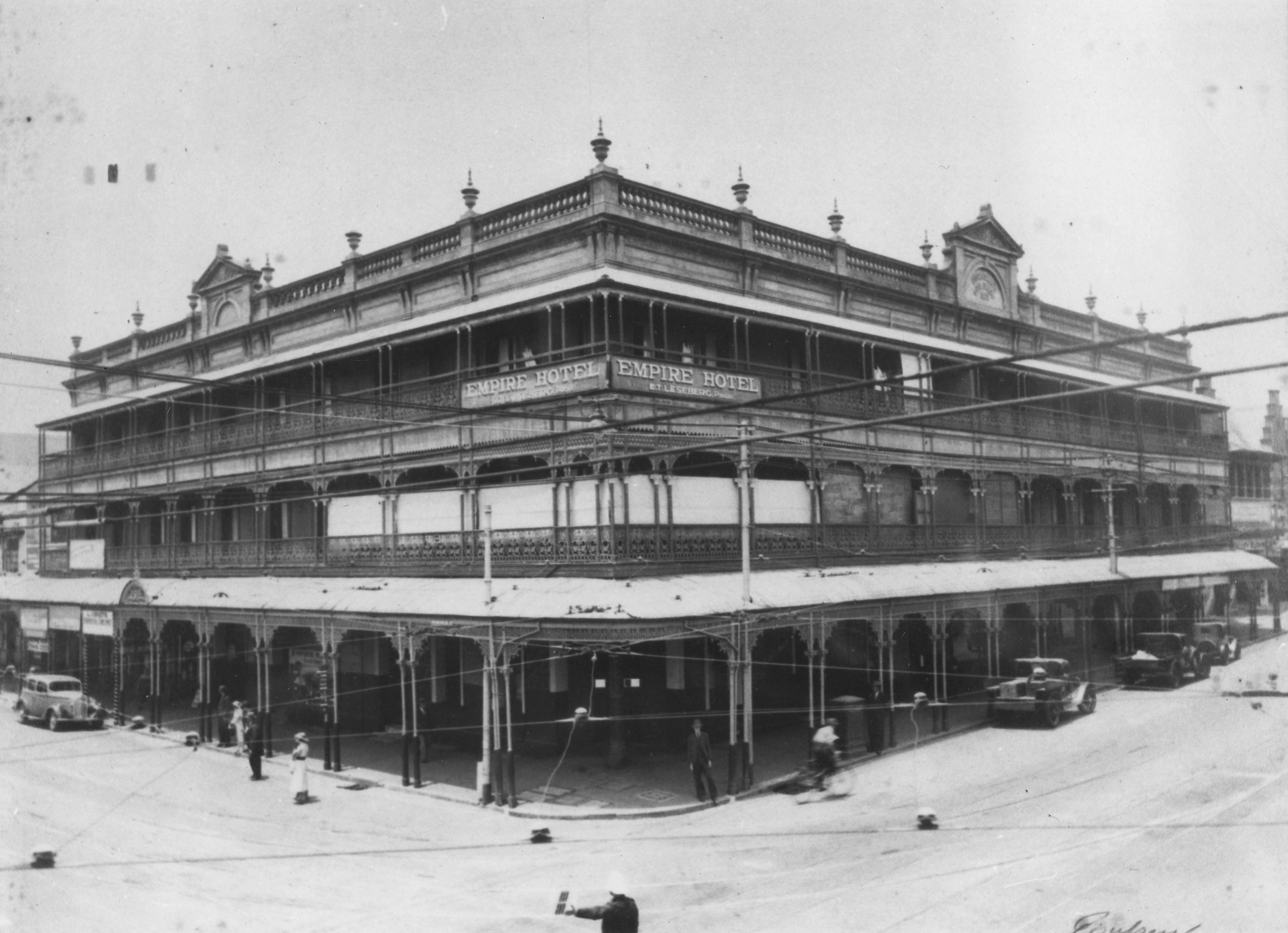
Empire Hotel, circa 1934

The hotel was renovated in 1925 to plans by Richard Gailey Jnr and again in 1937 to plans by architects Hall and Phillips. This latter work involved converting part of the Ann Street section to the "Empire Apartments". These apartments were later demolished in the 1960s, reducing the Ann Street frontage from seven bays to three. The original convex iron and post awning has been replaced by one with a cantilevered design.

== Description ==
A rendered building constructed of brick and stone, the Empire Hotel is located at a prominent intersection in Fortitude Valley. It consists of a main three storeyed L-shaped structure with basement, a two storeyed section on the south-western end facing Brunswick Street, a one storeyed skillion roofed section adjoining the rear of the main building, and a detached one-storeyed rendered masonry toilet block, also at the rear.

The Brunswick Street elevation comprises six bays and the Ann Street elevation contains three bays. A cantilevered awning extends along the two street frontages which are tiled at ground level.

Above the awning are two levels of projecting verandahs. These highly ornate verandahs are supported by twin cast-iron columns and feature timber handrails, cast-iron balustrades and brackets and a timber and cast-iron frieze at the junction between the first and second levels. French doors open onto the verandah which is roofed with rolled corrugated iron.

Painted corrugated iron hip roofs are concealed on the street elevations by an ornate masonry parapet wall. Supported on shallow twin brackets, the parapet consists of masonry balusters and pillars at the junction of each bay topped by urns. A projecting pediment in the Brunswick Street facade which breaks the line of the parapet is flanked by interlocking circles, instead of balusters.

The ground floor contains a bottle shop entered from the street corner, a public bar with entry from Brunswick Street, an entry foyer also opening off Brunswick Street, a lounge bar and bistro and a loading bay. There are remnants of art deco plaster work throughout. The entry foyer, now in the art deco manner, features decorative plaster ceilings, patterned floors, tiled walls, timber doors with etched glass panels, and a 1930s lift. The original 1889 staircase has been refurbished with metal balustrade and tiled walls to the first floor level but retains its original timber joinery and balustrade between the first and second floor. Two arched windows, the lower one being leadlight, illuminate the stairwell.

A lounge, dining room, kitchen, private bar and staff rooms are located on the first floor. These rooms have ornate plaster cornices and ceilings. The lounge and dining rooms have timber parquetry floors and coloured leadlight windows in distinctive art deco patterns.

On the second floor bedrooms and bathrooms are linked by a central corridor. Much of the fabric dates from 1889 including doors, architraves and skirtings, plasters arches over the hallway and main stairwell. A second staircase, with original timber panelling and balustrades, links the first and second floors at the south-western end of the Anne Street elevation.

== Heritage listing ==
Empire Hotel was listed on the Queensland Heritage Register on 21 October 1992 having satisfied the following criteria.

The place is important in demonstrating the evolution or pattern of Queensland's history.

The Empire Hotel is significant for its association with a major phase in the development of Fortitude Valley.

The place is important in demonstrating the principal characteristics of a particular class of cultural places.

The Empire Hotel is significant as an excellent example of a large ornate 1880s hotel which was partly refurbished in the 1930s and makes a dominant contribution to the streetscape at the intersection of Ann and Brunswick Streets.

The place is important because of its aesthetic significance.

The Empire Hotel is significant as an excellent example of a large ornate 1880s hotel which was partly refurbished in the 1930s and makes a dominant contribution to the streetscape at the intersection of Ann and Brunswick Streets.

The place has a special association with the life or work of a particular person, group or organisation of importance in Queensland's history.

The Empire Hotel is significant as one of a group of hotels designed by architect Richard Gailey which contribute to the architectural character of Brisbane through their imposing presence, and extensive use of ornamental cast-iron and classical detailing.
