= Jubilee Hotel =

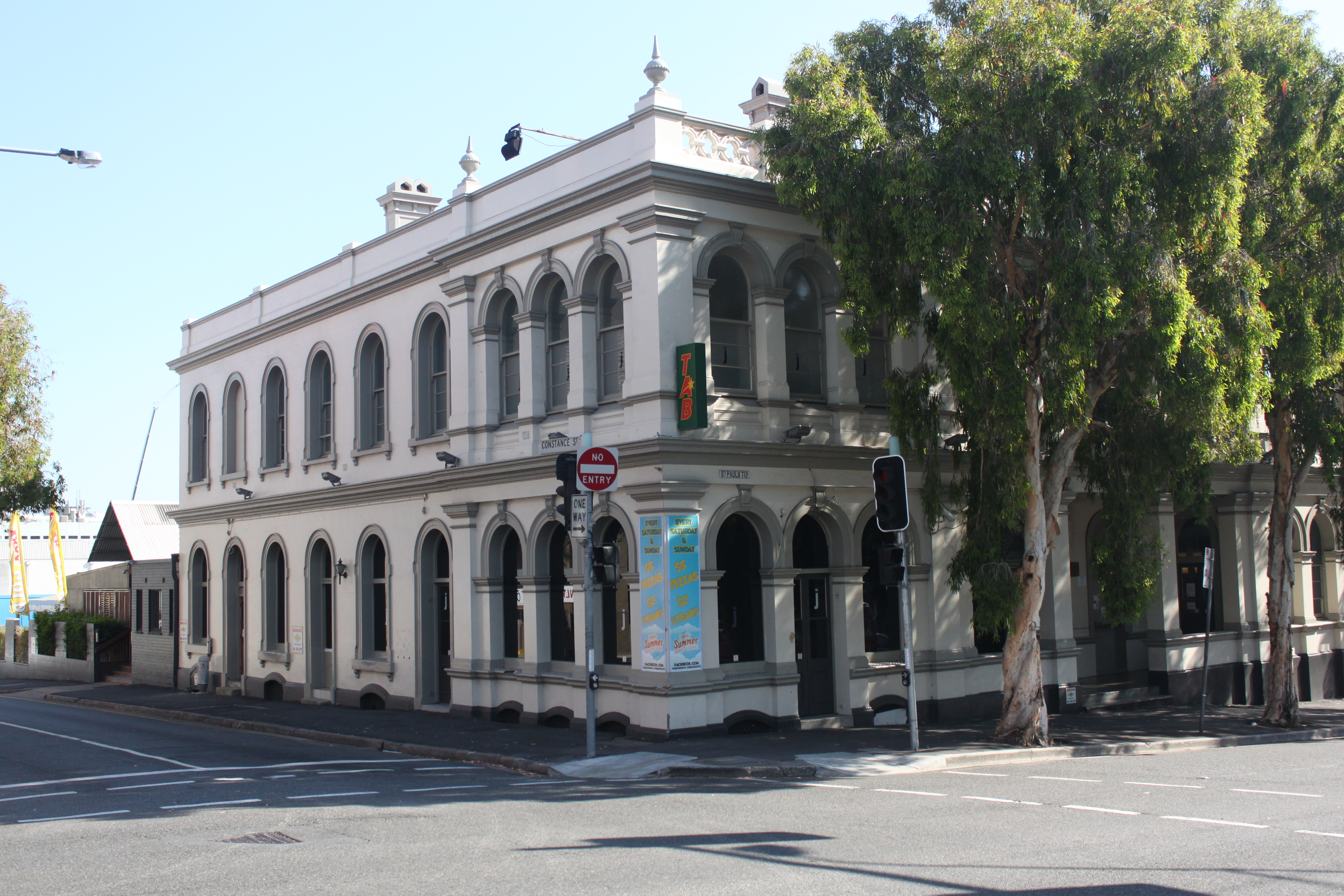
- Jubilee Hotel, 2012

- Location within Queensland Location within Australia
- 27.4536°S 153.0336°E
- Location: 464–468 St Pauls Terrace, Fortitude Valley, City of Brisbane, Queensland, Australia

History
- Design period: 1870s–1890s (late 19th century)
- Built: 1887–1888
- Built for: William Gooley

Site notes
- Architect: Richard Gailey
- Architectural style: Classicism

Queensland Heritage Register
- Official name: Jubilee Hotel
- Type: state heritage (built)
- Designated: 21 October 1992
- Reference no.: 600211
- Significant period: 1880s (fabric); 1888–ongoing (historical use as Hotel)
- Significant components: loggia/s

Jubilee Hotel is a heritage-listed hotel at 464–468 St Pauls Terrace, Fortitude Valley, City of Brisbane, Queensland, Australia. It was designed by Richard Gailey and built from 1887 to 1888. It was added to the Queensland Heritage Register on 21 October 1992.

== History ==
The Jubilee Hotel was constructed for William Gooley in 1887–88. It was designed by architect Richard Gailey who had designed a number of other hotels in Fortitude Valley. This was a boom year for hotel construction in the Valley with the Gailey-designed Empire Hotel and Prince Consort Hotel also opening in 1888.

The Jubilee differed from these other hotels in size and location. It was built to a smaller scale yet remained an imposing building because of its location in what was then a residential area.

The first licensee was Isabella Atwell who ran the hotel, later with her husband, until 1902. William Gooley's widow, Margaret, sold the hotel to Castlemaine Perkins in 1926. It was sold to the present owners in 1986. The ground floor was refurbished and a beer garden added at the rear.

== Description ==
The Jubilee Hotel, located on the corner of Constance Street and St Pauls Terrace, is a two-storeyed rendered brick building with a basement. L-shaped in plan the building has ornate street facades featuring arched window and door openings and an ornamented parapet. Small arched openings at the base of the street elevations ventilate the basement.

Windows and doors in the ground floor street elevations have been replaced with fixed glass with the exception of double timber doors opening off Constance Street and three double hung timber windows in the public bar.

The St Pauls Terrace elevation, articulated with classical detailing, is divided into three bays. The central bay is recessed to form loggias on the ground and first floors. The main entrance is framed by an arched open top pediment. This entrance, a timber door with fanlight and sidelights, opens onto a central hallway. Much of the ground floor interior has been altered. Plaster ceilings with ornate ceiling roses and cornices remain in the hallway and lounge bar. The hallway retains its rear doors and a richly detailed set of double doors leading to the public bar. Timber stairs at the back of the hallway lead to the first floor.

The doors at the rear of the hallway open onto an L-shaped, skillion roofed, rear verandah. It has been enclosed on the ground floor by subsequent extensions and on the first floor by glass louvres. A second timber stair runs in a single flight between the two levels of verandah.

The first floor has undergone minor alterations. The hallway has been blocked by a partition wall and bathrooms have been built at both ends of the rear verandah. A section of masonry wall has been removed to create a large room on the southern corner of the first floor. The remainder of the first floor is used for accommodation.

A beer garden consisting of timber decks and skillion roofs has been added to the rear of the hotel amalgamating a previously freestanding masonry structure with a corrugated iron hip roof.

== Heritage listing ==
Jubilee Hotel was listed on the Queensland Heritage Register on 21 October 1992 having satisfied the following criteria.

The place is important in demonstrating the evolution or pattern of Queensland's history.

Its association with a major phase in the development of Fortitude Valley

The place is important in demonstrating the principal characteristics of a particular class of cultural places.

An example of an 1880s hotel of simple massing, and with classical embellishments internally and externally

The place is important because of its aesthetic significance.

Its contribution to the St Pauls Terrace Streetscape

The place has a special association with the life or work of a particular person, group or organisation of importance in Queensland's history.

One of a group of hotels designed by architect Richard Gailey which contribute to the architectural character of Brisbane
