= Brisbane Marathon =

Annual running event

- Date: April (2001-2003, 2005-2008); May (1992-1995, 1997-2000, 2004); June (1996, 2019-2026); August (2009-2018)
- Location: Brisbane, Australia
- Event type: Road
- Distance: Marathon
- Primary sponsor: EVA Air
- Established: 1992
- Course records: Men's: 2:21:38 (2025) (Japan) Takaki Mori; Women's: 2:43:44 (2025) (Australia) Kathryn Parkinson
- Website: Brisbane Marathon
- Participants: 2,377 finishers (2025 42.2km)

The Brisbane Marathon was first run in 1992 and is Brisbane's only marathon distance running event. Other races in the marathon festival include a half marathon, a 10 km run, a 5 km run/walk and a children's 2 km 'mini marathon'.

The marathon course is IAAF-AIMS certified and accepted as a Boston Marathon qualifier.

The 2012 race saw more than 5,000 participants from 18 countries race along inner city streets. 2024 saw a milestone of over 10,000 participants across all events with over 8,700+ confirmed finishers.

There was no marathon in 2020. Entrants got automatic entry deferral to 2021 besides running a virtual race for no charge.

== Marathon Results ==
* = Gender Course Record

The Brisbane Marathon website holds an Honour Roll for winners of the Marathon and Half-Marathon events in their respective years.

=== Marathon Winners ===
Edition	Year	Men's winner	Time (h:m:s)	Women's winner	Time (h:m:s)	Finishers
33rd	2025	Takaki Mori (JPN)	2:21:38*	Kathryn Parkinson (AUS)	2:43:44*	2,377
32nd	2024	Saeki Makino (JPN)	2:24:01	Eve Mure (AUS)	2:54:37	1,481
31st	2023	Jonathan Peters (AUS)	2:25:22	Kathryn Parkinson (AUS)	2:45:04	946
30th	2022	Wayne Spies (AUS)	2:28:06	Erchana Murray-Bartlett (AUS)	2:57:33	568
29th	2021	Nicholas Lee (AUS)	2:29:40	Marina Wong (AUS)	2:44:03	683
28th	2019	Clay Dawson (AUS)	2:33:40	Sidney Andrew (AUS)	2:54:11	453
27th	2018	Saeki Makino (JPN)	2:23:18	Leah Fitzgerald (AUS)	2:53:36	621
26th	2017	Clay Dawson (AUS)	2:28:15	Roxie Fraser (AUS)	2:55:54	626
25th	2016	Klarie McIntyre (AUS)	2:35:27	Marita Eisler (AUS)	2:57:31	601
24th	2015	Samuel Woldeamanuel (ETH)	2:21:50	Sally Matsubara (AUS)	2:57:27	511
23rd	2014	Clay Dawson (AUS)	2:30:43	Roxie Fraser (AUS)	2:54:35	519
22nd	2013	Sammy Tum (KEN)	2:31:23	Renee White (AUS)	3:04:50	546
21st	2012	Ralf Hamann (AUS)	2:43:53	Sandi Rabie (AUS)	3:12:05	429
20th	2011	Justin Creek (AUS)	2:44:31.7	Jane Christinson (AUS)	3:13:43.7	325
19th	2010	Richard Gardiner (AUS)	2:37:28.8	Kirsten Molloy (AUS)	2:49:52.5	276
18th	2009	Darren Moyle (AUS)	2:41:00.5	Lucy Blaber (AUS)	2:55:02.9	277
17th	2008	Aidan Hobbs (AUS)	2:43:38.6	Roxie Schmidt (AUS)	2:49:34.1	185
16th	2007	Abdullah Batal (MAR)	2:39:17	Gayle Clark (AUS)	3:30:14	135
15th	2006	Justin Hunter (AUS)	2:43:45	Siri Terjesen (USA)	3:13:13	165
14th	2005	Andrew Thompson (AUS)	2:39:27	Wendy Stewart (AUS)	3:23:53	118
13th	2004	Andrew Thompson (AUS)	2:38:00	Robyn Wallace (AUS)	3:23:15	113
12th	2003	Bradley Smith (AUS)	2:34:00	Robyn Wallace (AUS)	3:18:06	118
11th	2002	Bradley Smith (AUS)	2:34:02	Lisa Polizzi (AUS)	2:56:48	140
10th	2001	Mark Jackson (AUS)	2:34:36	Corallea Edwards (AUS)	3:04:50	143
9th	2000	Mark Jackson (AUS)	2:29:46	Linda Fox (AUS)	2:50:23	136
8th	1999	Robert Ellis (AUS)	2:22:12	Rachel Gibney (AUS)	2:59:26	197
7th	1998	Ron Peters (AUS)	2:30:42.3	Janine Reid (AUS)	2:59:57.7	179
6th	1997	Nigel Ball (NZL)	2:28:10	Birgit Schuckmann (GER)	2:45:53	235
5th	1996	Nigel Ball (NZL)	2:25:23	Bev Lucas (AUS)	2:55:00	232
4th	1995	Don Wallace (AUS)	2:24:48	Bev Lucas (AUS)	2:50:46	151
3rd	1994	Rod Cedaro (AUS)	2:24:53	Bev Lucas (AUS)	2:46:02	136
2nd	1993	Rod Cedaro (AUS)	2:23:29	Bev Lucas (AUS)	2:53:03	152
1st	1992	Ian Kent (AUS)	2:24:20	Rina Bradshaw (AUS)	2:51:18	101

== Other Event Results ==
=== Half Marathon Winners ===
Edition	Year	Men's winner	Time (h:m:s)	Women's winner	Time (h:m:s)	Finishers
18th	2025	Gishi Abdi Wake (ETH)	1:06:44	Riime Ringi (AUS)	1:15:32	4,457
17th	2024	Tim Vincent (AUS)	1:04:07*	Tennille Ellis (AUS)	1:19:03	3,711
16th	2023	Jason Hunt (AUS)	1:11:06	Cassie Fien (AUS)	1:17:52	2,769
15th	2022	Aidan Hobbs (AUS)	1:06:05	Cassie Fien (AUS)	1:16:02	1,766
14th	2021	Kieren Perkins (AUS)	1:06:41	Marnie Ponton (AUS)	1:13:33*	1,937
13th	2019	Isaias Beyn (AUS)	1:05:27	Melanie Panayiotou (AUS)	1:17:12	1,367
12th	2018	William Chebon (KEN)	1:09:35	Bec Bailey (AUS)	1:25:55	1,759
11th	2017	Jonathan Peters (AUS)	1:11:36	Clare Geraghty (AUS)	1:23:13	1,780
10th	2016	Isaias Beyn (AUS)	1:07:50	Cassie Fien (AUS)	1:15:48	1,653
9th	2015	Haile Tesfaye (ETH)	1:12:14	Cassie Fien (AUS)	1:15:03	1,626
8th	2014	Hintsa Mebrahtu (AUS)	1:13:06	Lou Abram (AUS)	1:24:22	1,614
7th	2013	Ben Toomey (AUS)	1:09:33	Melanie Panayiotou (AUS)	1:19:47	1,799
6th	2012	Tony Craig (AUS)	1:12:43	Clare Williams (AUS)	1:24:40	1,623
5th	2011	Trent Harlow (AUS)	1:12:45	Clare Geraghty (AUS)	1:19:12	1,285
4th	2010	Geoffrey Berkeley (AUS)	1:14:18	Tara Gorman (AUS)	1:23:52	1,035
3rd	2009	Brendon Seipolt (AUS)	1:15:59	Roxie Schmidt (AUS)	1:18:44	880
2nd	2008	Peter Eason (AUS)	1:10:44	Felicity Abram (AUS)	1:20:49	1,120
1st	2007	Andrew Walters (AUS)	1:11:55	Clare Geraghty (AUS)	1:16:08	812

== See also ==
- Bridge to Brisbane
- List of marathon races in Oceania
- Sport in Brisbane
