= Brunswick Street, Brisbane =

Street in Brisbane, Australia

Brunswick Street Queensland
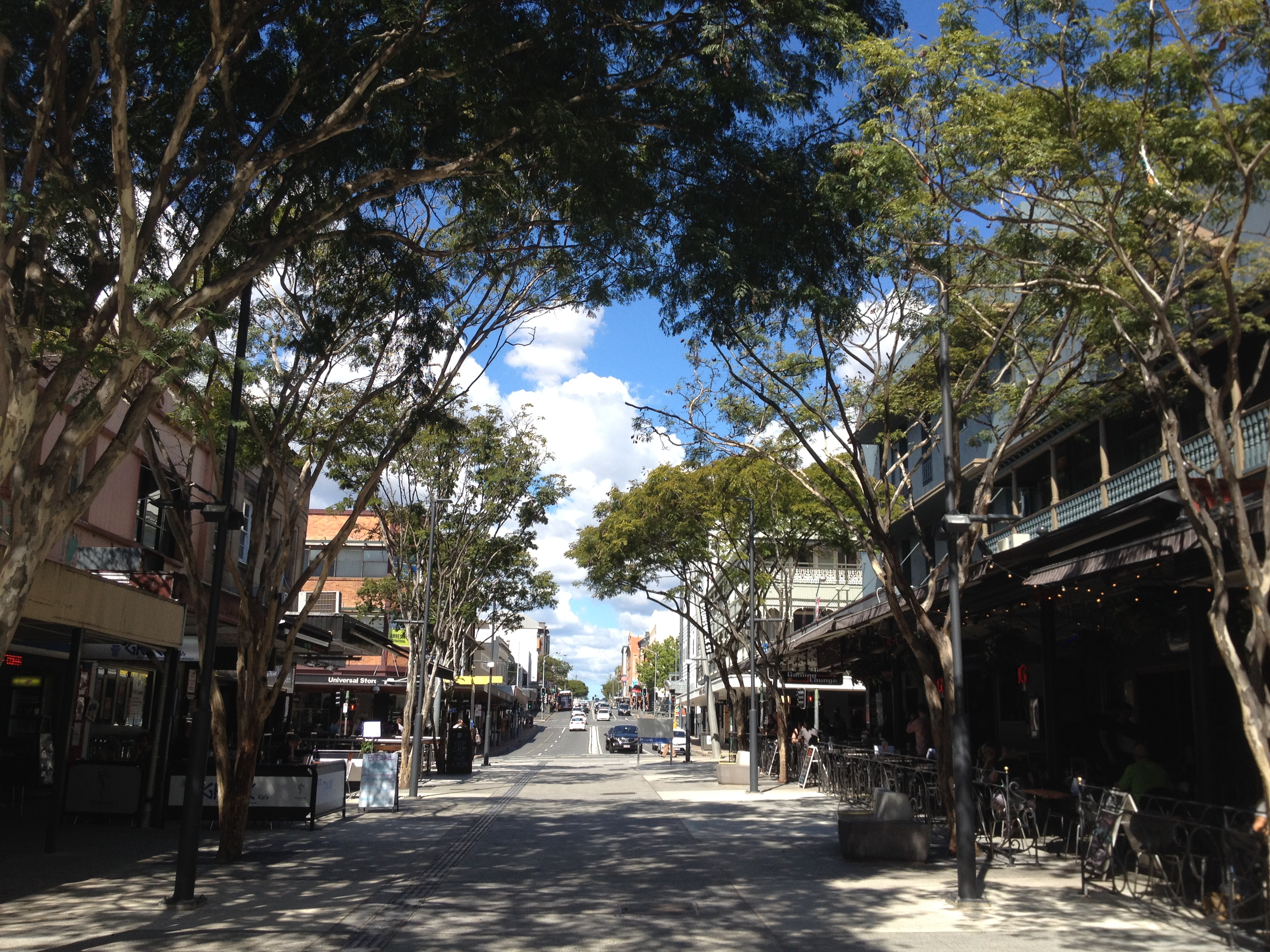
- Brunswick Street from the pedestrian mall

General information
- Type: Street
- Length: 4.5 km (2.8 mi)
- Route number(s): State Route 15

Major junctions
- North end: Bowen Hills
- South end: New Farm

Location(s)
- Suburb(s): Fortitude Valley

Brunswick Street is a main thoroughfare within the suburbs of New Farm and Fortitude Valley (known locally as the Valley) in Brisbane, Australia. The street is not entirely roadway but is a pedestrian mall for a hundred metres near its centre.

It is known as the major nightclub precinct in Brisbane, having many bars and clubs as well as restaurants located along its length. The McWhirters department store is situated on the corner of the Brunswick Street mall and Wickham Street.

One street to the west adjacent to the mall is their Chinatown. The heritage listed Corbett and Son Store and Coronet Flats were built along the street. The street is used for the Queensland Pride rally and march.

== Major intersections ==
- Gregory Terrace
- Water Street
- St Pauls Terrace
- Wickham Street
- Ann Street
- McLachlan Street
- Harcourt Street
- Kent Street
- Merthyr Road
- Oxlade Drive

== Heritage listings ==
Brunswick Street has a number of heritage-listed sites, including:

- McWhirters
- 323–335 Brunswick Street: Royal George Hotel and Ruddle's Building
- 339 Brunswick Street: Empire Hotel
- 446–452 Brunswick Street: former Corbett and Son Store
- 483 Brunswick Street: Fortitude Valley Primitive Methodist Church
- 517 Brunswick Street: La Scala
- 701 Brunswick Street: New Farm Cinemas
- New Farm Park
- Coronet Flats

== See also ==
- List of road routes in Queensland
