= Cedaro =

Cedaro is an Italian surname. Notable people with the surname include:

- Leandro Cedaro (born 1988), Argentine-born rugby union player
- Rod Cedaro, Australian triathlete
