= Coronet Flats =

Apartment building in Queensland, Australia

Coordinates: 27°28′13″S 153°03′00″E

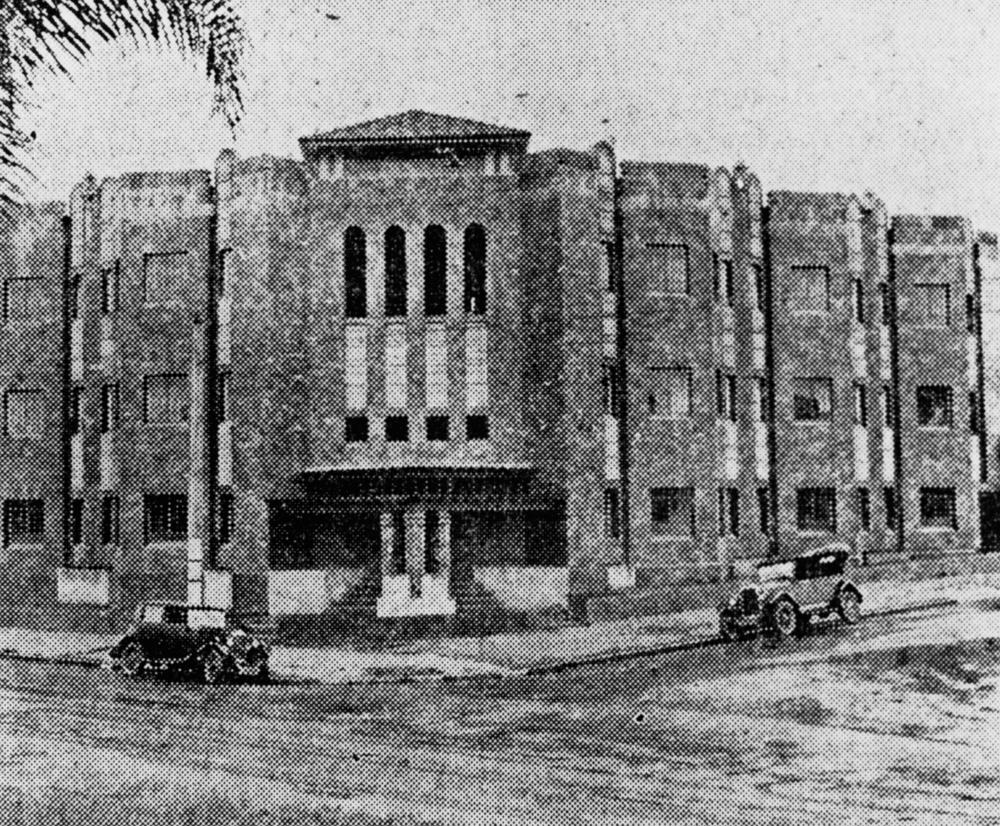
Coronet Flats in New Farm, Brisbane, 1933

Coronet Flats (also known as Coronet Court) is a residential apartment building on the corner of Brunswick Street and Elystan Road, New Farm, Queensland, Australia. With its prominent siting, unusual form, and striking Art Deco style, Coronet Flats is considered one of the most beautiful and recognisable private buildings of the 1930s in Brisbane.

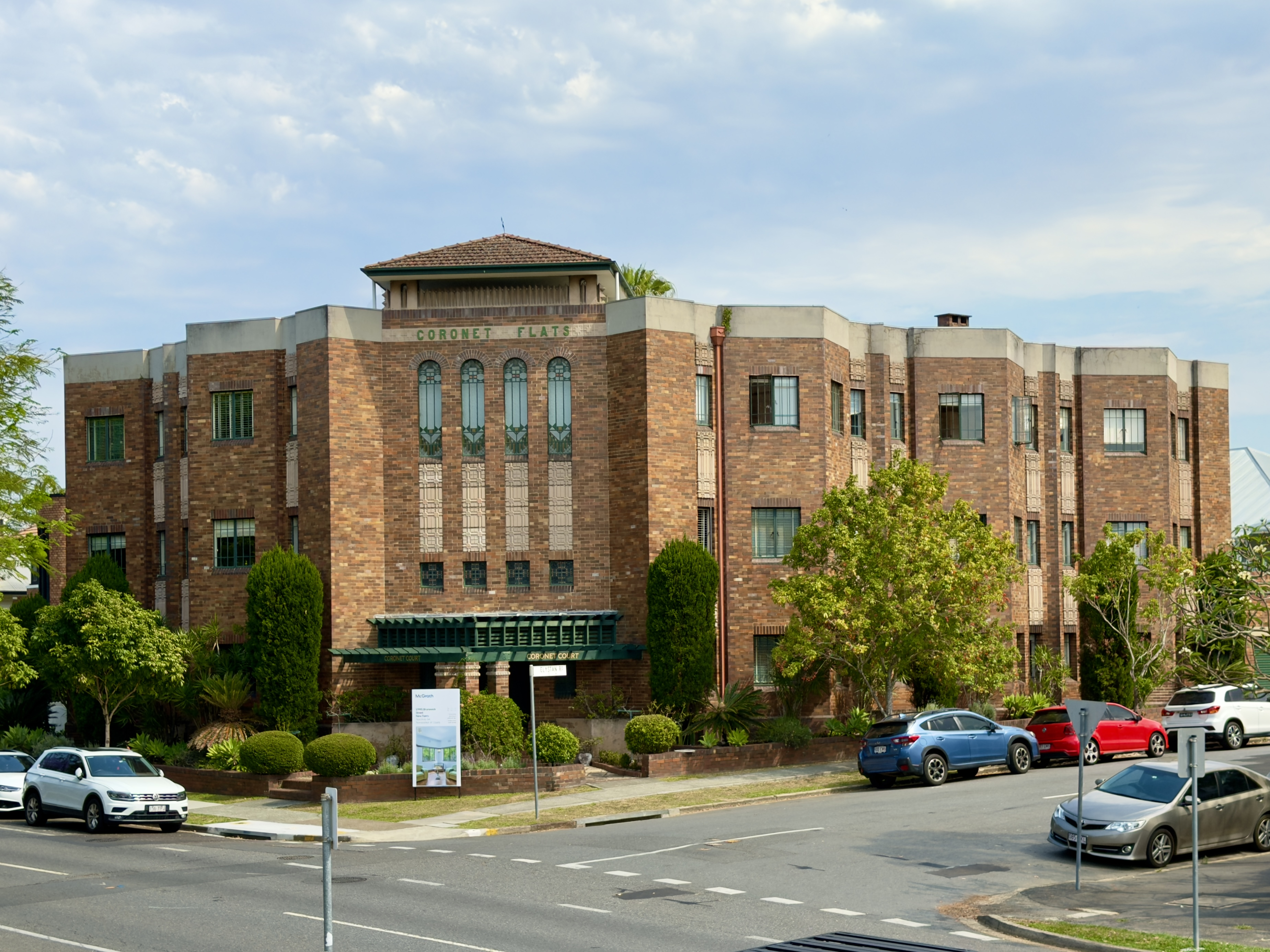
Coronet Flats in New Farm, Brisbane, 2025

== History ==
Coronet Flats was completed in November 1933 and was described at the time as having "the architectural dignity of a mansion". Max Strickland, Melbourne businessman and building developer, determined that Brisbane was lacking "up-to-date, well serviced" flats and contracted to have Coronet Flats built. Initially, Strickland planned an extension to be constructed adjacent (at 999 Brunswick Street) that would double the size of the building if the development proved successful. The two buildings would have formed a courtyard between them for a swimming pool, extra garages, and laundries. This is probably where the alternative name "Coronet Court" is derived. This was never realised with Strickland constructing a detached house on the site at a later date. The building was very popular at the time (with four of the nine flats let prior to completion) and remains so today. Strickland sold the building in 1939; since then it has stayed within the O'Connor family.

== Design ==
The site overlooks New Farm Park across Brunswick Street enjoying an open, north-eastern aspect and Strickland was keen to capitalise on this through climate-appropriate design. The brick building is three-storeys with a central entrance foyer angled to face the intersection of Brunswick Street and Elystan Road with wings extending parallel to the roads. Described at the time as arresting and original, the accomplished and cohesive design of the building owes a great deal to the untrained Strickland's desire to "suit the climate and to meet the desires of flat-dwellers in the matter of a pleasing outlook". The walls of the flats are characterised by angled bays of windows designed to catch prevailing breezes from across the park and also to provide sweeping views of the landscape. The Art Deco features of this stunning apartment building include a grand galleried staircase, tall arched stained glass windows, unique ceiling plasterwork, and custom pendant lights.
