= Brunswick Street Mall =

Pedestrian mall in Brisbane, Australia

Coordinates: 27°27′28″S 153°2′3″E

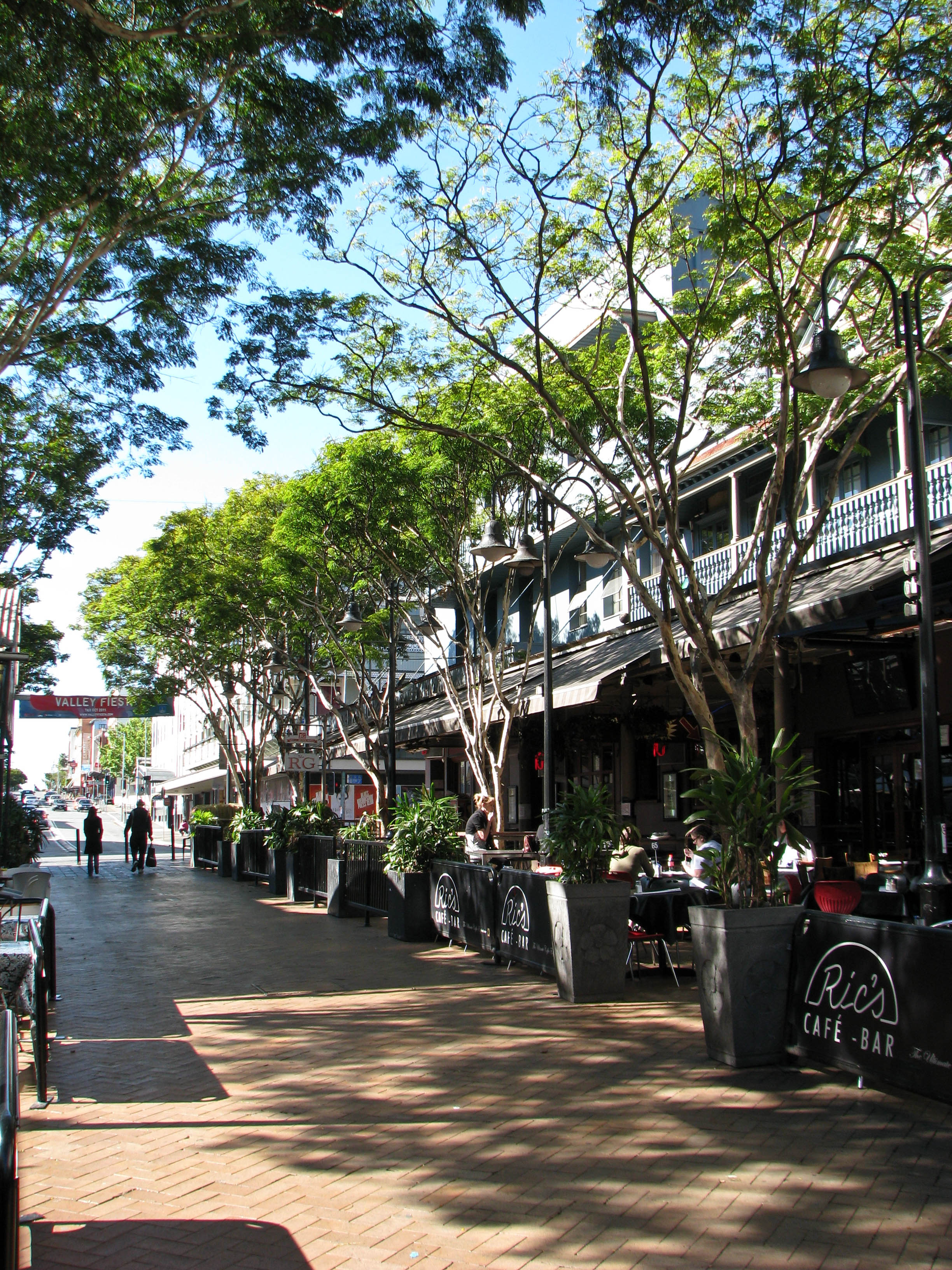
Brunswick Street Mall, facing towards Ann Street.

Brunswick Street Mall is a pedestrian mall in Fortitude Valley, Brisbane, Australia. The Mall occupies all of Brunswick Street between Wickham Street and Ann Street.

== History ==
Brunswick Street Mall was constructed in 1991, and renovated in 1995.

Brisbane City Council began a redevelopment the Mall in January, 2014. The project was built by JMac Constructions (a subsidiary of BMD Group) at a cost of $4,000,000, and was expected to take six months. The redevelopment was originally due to take place in 2016, but was pushed forward to make it ready for the G-20 Summit.

== See also ==
- Brunswick Street
