= Battle of the Tech Bands =

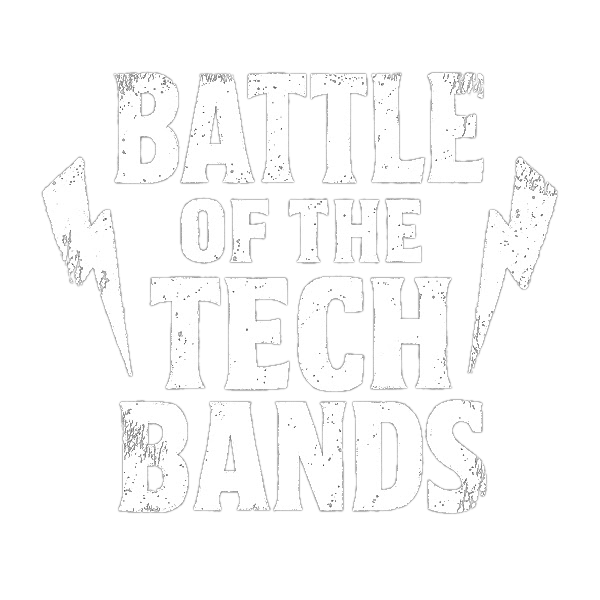
- Logo for the event (above).
- Status: Active
- Genre: Charity music event
- Frequency: Annual
- Location: Australia
- Inaugurated: 2022
- Participants: Technology company employee bands
- Website: www.battleofthetechbands.com

Battle of the Tech Bands is an Australian charity music event featuring bands formed by employees of technology companies. Established in 2022, the event has been held in Brisbane and Sydney, with proceeds supporting the disability charity Youngcare.

The event received national media attention in 2025 following criticism from musicians and industry groups over the involvement of large technology companies amid debates about artificial intelligence and copyright.

== History ==
The first Battle of the Tech Bands was held in 2022 at Black Bear Lodge in Brisbane. The inaugural event featured bands made up of employees from several Brisbane-based technology companies and was organised as a community charity fundraiser.

Subsequent editions were held annually in Brisbane, including events at The Triffid.

In 2025, the competition also expanded to Sydney, with the Sydney edition held on 23 October at the Factory Theatre in Marrickville.

== Format ==
Battle of the Tech Bands follows a battle of the bands format, with each band representing a technology company. Performers are employees rather than professional musicians, and performances typically consist of cover versions of well-known songs. Ticket sales and donations are directed to charity.

== Participating companies ==
Companies whose employee bands have participated include:

- Amazon
- Atlassian
- Canva
- Google
- Salesforce

Participation varies by year and location.

== Charity ==
The event has previously raised funds for Youngcare, an Australian charity that supports young people with high physical support needs. According to the organisers and Youngcare, proceeds from ticket sales and donations are directed to the charity's programs.

== Controversy ==
In October 2025, Battle of the Tech Bands became the subject of criticism from musicians and music industry representatives amid broader disputes between artists and technology companies over copyright and artificial intelligence.

Musicians including Holly Rankin (Jack River) and Paul Dempsey criticised the involvement of major technology companies, arguing that while licences were obtained to perform cover songs at the charity event, some of the same companies were lobbying for exemptions that would allow AI systems to train on copyrighted works without licensing.

Industry bodies including APRA AMCOS and ARIA confirmed that the performances were appropriately licensed and used the event to highlight wider concerns about fair compensation for artists.
