= Corbett and Son Store =

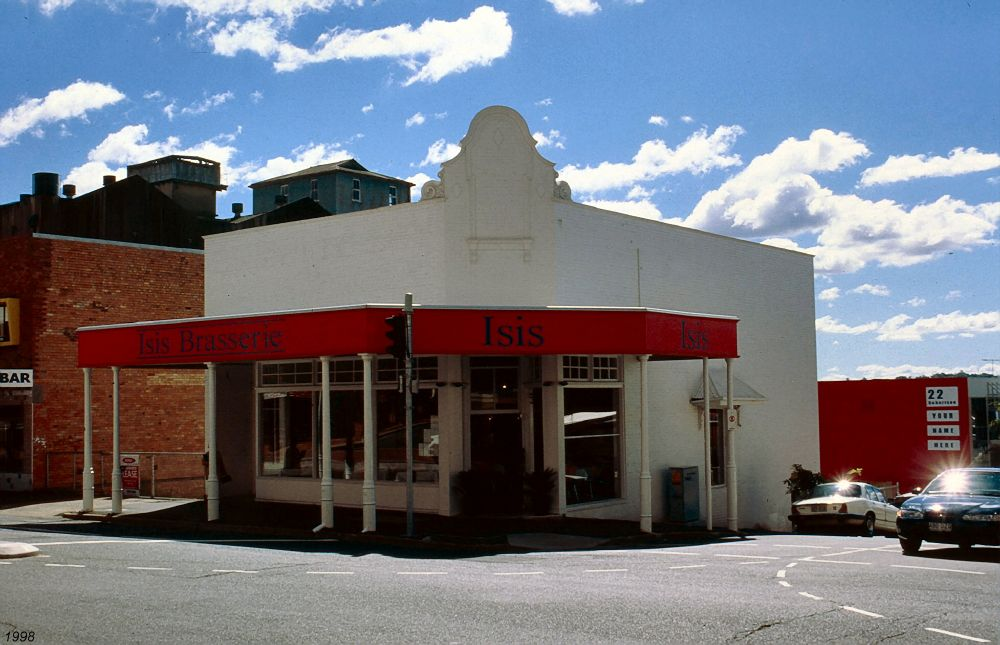

- Location within Queensland Location within Australia
- 27.4599°S 153.0373°E
- Location: 446–452 Brunswick Street, Fortitude Valley, City of Brisbane, Queensland, Australia

History
- Design period: 1900–1914 (early 20th century)
- Built: 1908
- Built for: Patrick and Michael Corbett

Site notes
- Architect: Robin Dods

Queensland Heritage Register
- Official name: Corbett and Son Store (former), Diamonds Dry Cleaners, Isis Restaurant, Peerless Dry Cleaners
- Type: state heritage (built)
- Designated: 26 May 2000
- Reference no.: 601022
- Significant period: 1900s (fabric); 1908–1930s (historical use as grocery store).
- Significant components: basement / sub-floor, shed/s

Corbett and Son Store is a heritage-listed store at 446–452 Brunswick Street, Fortitude Valley, City of Brisbane, Queensland, Australia. It was designed by Robin Dods and built in 1908. It was also known as Diamonds Dry Cleaners, Peerless Dry Cleaners and Isis Restaurant. It was added to the Queensland Heritage Register on 26 May 2000.

== History ==
This brick single-storied with basement store was designed by architect RS (Robin) Dods in 1908 for wine merchants and grocers, Patrick and Michael Corbett.

The site, located on the corner of Brunswick and Robertson (then Jane) Streets, was purchased in 1907 by the Corbett's (who had operated a grocery store from the site since 1885) from the estate of Angus Ross subject to an easement, which provided rear access to nearby properties fronting Brunswick St. Ross had acquired the site, which formed part of the eastern suburban allotment (ESA) 37 by deed of grant in 1851, just two years after John Dunmore Lang's privately sponsored immigrants made their settlement in what became known as Fortitude (after one of the immigrant ships) Valley. According to the post office directories, the site remains unoccupied until 1878, when part of it is leased to builder and grocer, Frederick T Smith. By this time, this part of Brunswick Street, which provided the major thoroughfare to New Farm, is starting to develop as a mixed use area, combining small commercial and residential premises.

During the 1880s, development of this section of the Valley intensifies: Brunswick Street between John and Jane Streets now includes a number of commercial premises (music teacher, collar and harness maker, dyer and furrier, painter, and fruiterer) as well as two stores located on the subject site, including from 1885 a grocery store at no.450 operated by Patrick Corbett. Nearby on the opposite side of Jane Street, John Lennon's two story masonry premises (ground floor shop with residence on upper floor) are erected in 1885; and on the opposite side of Brunswick Street, two substantial tobacco factories are constructed in 1889 (Cameron Bros, later to become a brewery and Robert Dixson and Co).

In the 1890s, despite a downturn in the Queensland economy, the Valley continued to develop, led by the large retailers, TC Beirne and James McWhirter whose Brunswick Street drapers stores quickly grew to become large department stores, and further fuelled by the developing Brisbane tram network in which the Valley was a central node. By the turn of the century the Valley was established as the second major commercial district of the city supplanting South Brisbane and the Woolloongabba Fiveways. Corbett's store, although on the fringe of the main Valley commercial area, would conceivably have benefited from this development as well as from the increasing residential population as the land on both sides of Brunswick Street was subdivided.

In 1908, following purchase of the site, Patrick Corbett and his son Michael erect their new masonry premises. Architect RS (Robin) Dods (1868–1920) was to make the most of the sloping corner site. Although single storied, the height of the parapet and the simple bold enrichment of red brickwork relieved with bands of white brickwork (now obscured by paint) and cement dressings enabled the building to robustly address Brunswick and Jane Streets, as well as its nearby more substantial neighbours. The main entrance of the new shop was from the corner, a secondary door from Brunswick Street provided access to the basement level via an internal staircase. The shopfront was constructed to provide a generous display area as well as ventilation and light to the lower floor (via the setback of the floor). A separate delivery entrance to the upper floor was located on Robertson Street via sliding timber doors.

Although a relatively modest example of the work of Robin Dods, Corbett's store is a fine example of his commercial work, much of which has been demolished. From 1896 to 1916, Dods was in partnership with Francis Richard Hall, as Hall & Dods. Dods is described as having a highly developed architectural imagination, his introduction of the formal and philosophical ideas of both the British Arts and Crafts movement and Edwardian classicism and his significant functional solutions to the problems of living and building in Queensland combined to achieve an "architectural revolution in Brisbane")

In 1914, title was granted to Michael Corbett who continued to operate the business until his death in the 1930s. In 1938, the shop was leased to dry cleaners, Diamonds Pty Ltd; Joseph Diamond acquired the site in 1947. Diamonds continued to occupy the site until c. 1990, when it was acquired by Peerless Drycleaners and later by the present owner. Recent changes to the building include the demolition and rebuilding (with loss of some detail) of the awning over Brunswick St; demolition of a rear corrugated iron addition, and replacement of sliding timber doors to Robertson St service entry with a window. In the last decade, urban renewal has brought considerable changes to the Fortitude Valley area, including changes of use to a number of existing buildings: the upper story of the former grocery store / dry-cleaning premises is now a restaurant; the basement, a commercial tenancy.

== Description ==
The former Corbett and Sons store, a brick single-storeyed with basement structure, is located on the corner of Brunswick and Robertson Streets, Fortitude Valley. The building's roof is concealed behind a high parapet, with a street awning fronting Brunswick Street and returning into Robertson Street. The site slopes to the northeast, with the building having a two-storeyed elevation at the rear.

The principal entrance is located at the truncated corner of the two streets, and is surmounted by a decorative shaped gable with rendered detailing to the parapet. The paired entrance doors are recessed, with a marble step and tessellated tiled threshold, and surmounted by a panel of glass louvres. The shopfront, fronting Brunswick Street and returning into Robertson Street, has large paned display windows surmounted by high level multi-paned panels. Louvred panels located below the display windows along Brunswick Street have been sheeted over. A separate entrance is located at the western end of the Brunswick Street elevation, and consists of a recessed multi-paned door with tiled threshold. The street awning has a box fascia with cast iron columns, two of which are missing. The awning has a pressed metal soffit, and has recently been reconstructed losing some of Dods' original detailing. The building is constructed of painted English bond masonry, but originally consisted of red brickwork relieved with bands of white brickwork with rendered mouldings.

The Robertson Street elevation has a timber framed, hipped corrugated iron awning with window (formerly a separate service entrance with sliding timber doors). A lower entrance at the northern end of the Robertson Street elevation provides access to the basement. The rear of the building has a basement entrance at the northern corner, with a timber stair accessing the rear door to the shop level. Tall windows, with glass louvre panels and security bars, are located at the rear corners of the building, and the brickwork shows evidence of an earlier rear wing. The side elevation also has two small high level window openings, and a window with security bars lighting the basement at the rear corner.

Internally, the shop level has a pressed metal ceiling, areas of which have been damaged, painted masonry walls and a timber floor. The floor was originally set back from the Brunswick Street display windows to provide light and ventilation to the basement, however the setback has been infilled. A shallow bulkhead above the display windows indicate the position of screens which originally formed a backdrop to the display space. The rear northeast corner has a raised section of floor, which allows access from the Robertson Street entrance to the basement. The basement has a concrete floor, and timber posts supporting the floor above.

The northwest side of the site has a concrete slab, and the rear of the site is vacant except for a small shed at the northern corner.

== Heritage listing ==
The former Corbett and Son Store was listed on the Queensland Heritage Register on 26 May 2000 having satisfied the following criteria.

The place is important in demonstrating the evolution or pattern of Queensland's history.

It is important in illustrating the development of Fortitude Valley as it continued to develop into the twentieth century as a major commercial district.

The place is important in demonstrating the principal characteristics of a particular class of cultural places.

The store is important in demonstrating the principal characteristics of a corner store, albeit one with more sophisticated architectural pretensions. The rear service laneway, which has provided access to nearby Brunswick Street commercial premises since at least 1907, demonstrates a type of land use and development relatively rare in Brisbane.

The place is important because of its aesthetic significance.

The building makes a significant contribution to the Brunswick Street streetscape, and is an important element in the commercial townscape of Fortitude Valley.

The place has a special association with the life or work of a particular person, group or organisation of importance in Queensland's history.

Erected in 1908, the former Corbett & Son store is an example of the commercial design work of architect RS (Robin) Dods, generally acknowledged as one of the most accomplished architects to practise in Queensland.
