= Fortitude Valley Primitive Methodist Church =

Fortitude Valley Primitive Methodist Church (former)
- Potters Gallery; Brisbane Modern Art Gallery
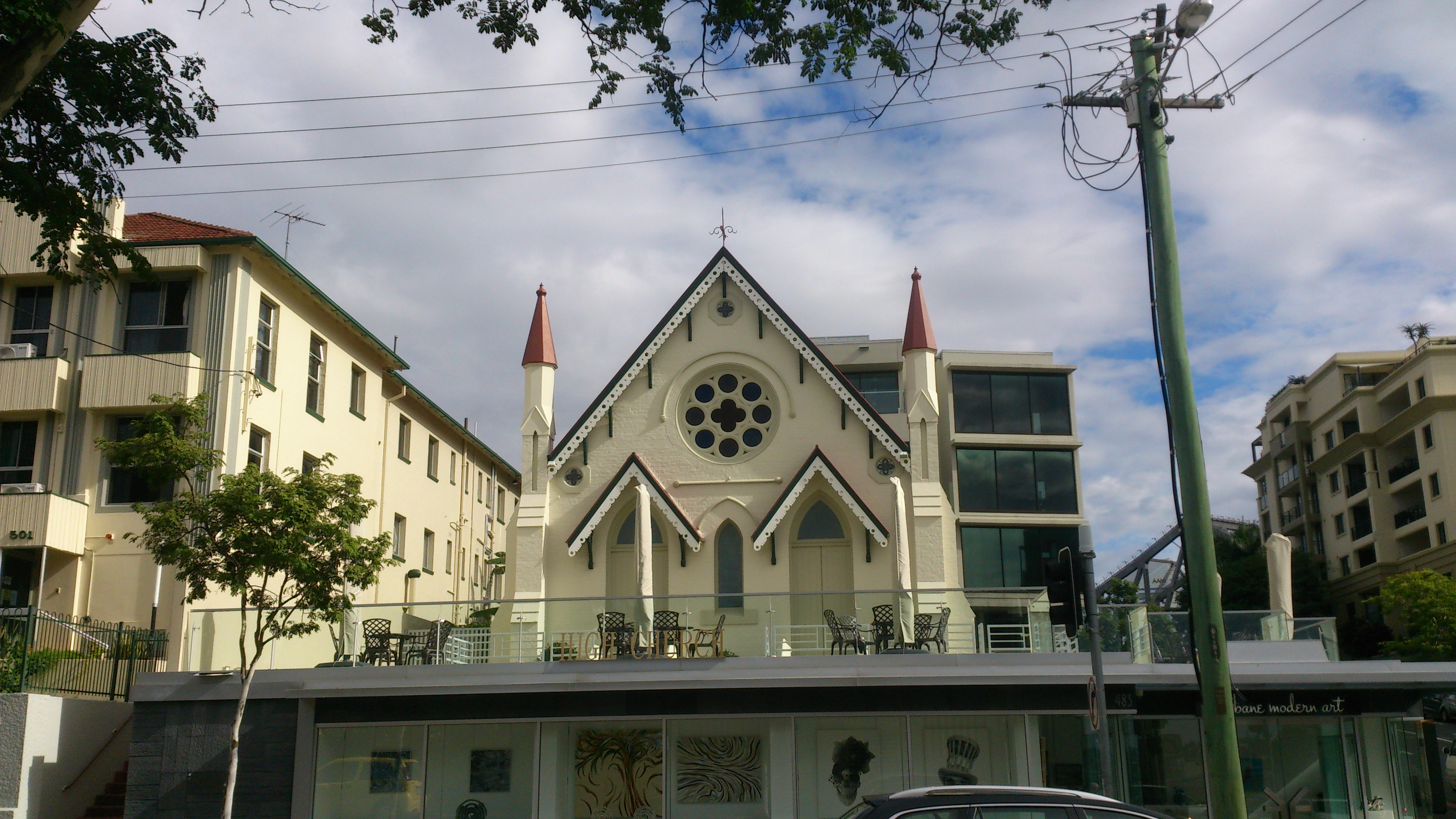
- Former Fortitude Valley Primitive Methodist Church
- Fortitude Valley Primitive Methodist Church (former)
- 27°27′40″S 153°02′17″E
- Address: 483 Brunswick Street, Fortitude Valley, City of Brisbane, Queensland
- Country: Australia
- Previous denomination: Primitive Methodist (1876–1898); Methodist (1898–1977); Uniting (1977–1982)

History
- Former names: High Church; Brunswick Street Methodist Church; Brunswick Street Uniting Church
- Status: Church (1876 – 1982); Commercial gallery (since 1982)
- Founded: 1 March 1876
- Founder: Corporation of the Primitive Methodist Connexion
- Dedicated: 24 September 1876

Architecture
- Architect: Richard Gailey
- Architectural type: Church (former)
- Style: Gothic Revival
- Years built: 1876 – 1900
- Construction cost: £1,100
- Closed: 1982 (as a church)

Queensland Heritage Register
- Official name: Potters Gallery, Brunswick Street Methodist Church, Brunswick Street Uniting Church, Fortitude Valley Primitive Methodist Church, High Church
- Type: State heritage (built)
- Designated: 21 October 1992
- Reference no.: 600206
- Significant period: 1876, 1900 (fabric); 1876–1982, 1898, 1977 (historical)
- Significant components: Wall/s – retaining
- Builders: John Smith & Sons

The Fortitude Valley Primitive Methodist Church is a heritage-listed former church and now an art gallery at 483 Brunswick Street, Fortitude Valley, City of Brisbane, Queensland, Australia. It was designed by Richard Gailey and built from 1876 to 1900 by John Smith & Sons on behalf of the Primitive Methodist Church.

It is also known as Brunswick Street Methodist Church, Brunswick Street Uniting Church, Potters Gallery, Brisbane Modern Art Gallery and High Church. It was added to the Queensland Heritage Register on 21 October 1992.

== History ==
This brick building was erected in 1876 for the Primitive Methodist congregation of Brisbane, on a site in Brunswick Street acquired by The Corporation of the Primitive Methodist Connexion in 1875. It was the third Primitive Methodist Church erected in Brisbane.

=== First and second church buildings ===
Primitive Methodist Services conducted by lay preachers commenced in Brisbane in 1859, and the first minister arrived the following year. A small church was built in Windmell (now McLachlan) Street, Fortitude Valley, in 1861, and shortly afterwards, a second church was erected in Adelaide Street. By the mid-1870s, a new church was necessary to serve the expanding Fortitude Valley population.

=== Third church building ===
Plans for the new church were drawn by Brisbane architect Richard Gailey, who designed a substantial number of Protestant churches in Queensland in the late 19th and early 20th centuries, including the Baptist City Tabernacle in Wickham Terrace, opened in 1890. Tenders for the Brunswick Street church were called in February 1876, and the contract was let to John Smith & Sons of Adelaide Street. Several foundation stones were laid on 1 March 1876, and the building was completed in about five and a half months at a cost of approximately £1,100, including fittings. The opening service was conducted on 24 September 1876. The Brunswick Street church became the centre of Primitive Methodism in Brisbane.

One of the most successful of the church's activities was the establishment of the Fortitude Valley Penny Savings Bank, which operated from the church premises from 1886 until 1982, and then from a private residence until wound up in 1993. Penny Savings Banks had operated in Brisbane from at least the 1870s, and generally were run by churches, working men's associations or lodges. They were neither registered banking institutions nor building or friendly societies; the aim of these banks appears to have been more to encourage people who could not afford the minimum deposit required by regular savings banks, to save. The Fortitude Valley Penny Savings Bank was established by Mr H Bennett, and maintained primarily by the Bennett family for over a century. Associated initially with the Primitive Methodist Sunday School, the bank later offered first mortgage housing loans. It was autonomous from the working of the church, but profits were donated to church maintenance and special projects.

Following the 1898 unification of Queensland's various Methodist groups - Wesleyans, Primitive Methodists, Bible Christians, and United Free Methodists - the Fortitude Valley Primitive Methodist Church became known as the Brunswick Street Methodist Church.

The building was extended in 1900, when a vestry and classroom were added at the rear of the building. These extensions were planned to commemorate the advent of the 20th century.

In 1935–36, a timber hall was constructed at the rear of the property. Plans were drawn by Rev Frederick Arthur Malcolm, and the building was erected by voluntary labour, at a cost of £375. A stump-capping ceremony was held on 17 August 1935, and the hall was opened on 5 April 1936. This building has been altered substantially, and does not form part of the present entry in the Heritage Register.

=== Church closure and subsequent use ===
In 1977 the congregation joined the Uniting Church and combined with the Fortitude Valley Presbyterian Church. The Brunswick Street church was no longer required and was sold to the Queensland Potters' Association in 1982. The purchase by Queensland Potters' Association was with the assistance of the Queensland State Government. The Association refurbished the building and added a steel-framed mezzanine floor, designed by conservation architect Richard Allom. In 1983 it opened the Potters Gallery on the premises to display and sell members' work.

In 2005 a major project was undertaken to construct a new gallery building on street level with the church building above it. Cox Rayner Architects designed the project. The new gallery opened in October 2008, after many difficulties; however, it closed in September 2010. The gallery building operated as a French bistro restaurant, Lady Lamington, for a period, before being sold in early 2014. It has since re-opened as a private art gallery, the Brisbane Modern Art Gallery.

== Description ==
The Fortitude Valley Primitive Methodist Church, a single-storeyed rendered masonry building with a stone plinth, is located on a raised corner site overlooking Brunswick Street and is accessed via twin stairs built into a carefully articulated and unpainted brick retaining wall.

The steep pitch gabled roof is clad with corrugated iron, and the building shows a strong Gothic influence in its design.

The rectangular plan consists of five bays with buttressed walls, and a rear storeroom with a corrugated iron skillion roof. Each bay houses a single lancet window, each of which is glazed with a sandblasted glass panel.

The symmetrical, highly decorative northern elevation has twin pointed arch doorways with entrance porches, a single lancet window and a rose window above. Access is via a twin set of stone stairs, and the elevation is framed by twin spires. The building has decorative timber work to eaves and bargeboards, with decorative mouldings around windows.

The southern elevation has a rose window above the original pulpit with the storeroom attached below. The rose windows are glazed in red, blue and yellow glass panels.

Internally, open timber trusses are positioned in line with the buttresses and the ceiling is boarded. Interior walls are rendered and a steel mezzanine has been inserted, supported by twelve columns and attached to the side walls in four places. Access is via a stair from the original raised pulpit platform which has the original pulpit and rail.

The storeroom has fanlights above windows and doors, and has been partially partitioned. A recent administration building is located to the rear of the building.

== Heritage listing ==
The Fortitude Valley Primitive Methodist Church was listed on the Queensland Heritage Register on 21 October 1992 having satisfied the following criteria.

The place is important in demonstrating the evolution or pattern of Queensland's history.

It is important in demonstrating the establishment and evolution of Primitive Methodism in Queensland in the second half of the 19th century.

The place is important because of its aesthetic significance.

It is important in exhibiting a range of aesthetic characteristics valued by the community, in particular its contribution, through scale, form and materials, to the Brunswick Street streetscape and Fortitude Valley townscape and its highly decorative northern street elevation.

The place has a special association with the life or work of a particular person, group or organisation of importance in Queensland's history.

It has a special association with Brisbane architect Richard Gailey, as an example of his ecclesiastical work and with the Fortitude Valley Penny Savings Bank for nearly a century.
