= Bridge to Brisbane =

Annual fun run in Brisbane, Australia

- Date: 25 August
- Location: Brisbane
- Event type: road
- Distance: Mini Marathon (also 10 km, 5 km, Wheelchair 10 km)
- Established: 1997
- Course records: 29:32 (M; 2009, Michael Shelley. 2014, Harry Summers); 33:54 (F; 2010, Cassandra Fien)
- Website: http://www.bridgetobrisbane.com.au/

Bridge to Brisbane is an annual long-distance fun run over a distance of 10-kilometre (6.2 mi) or 5-kilometre (3.1 mi) held in Brisbane, Australia in August.

The first race occurred in 1997 with fewer than 5000 entrants and each year the event raises funds for charity. 2007 saw 24,350 runners participate. In 2007 the Bridge to Brisbane attracted a field of up to 30,000 runners, while 2008 saw more than 36,000 people join the race and in 2009 more than 45,000 people took part.

== Route ==
Until 2015, the race began at the southern side of the Eastern Sir Leo Hielscher Bridge in Lytton and finished at the Ekka showgrounds in Bowen Hills. The route travels along Kingsford Smith Drive and the Inner City Bypass, towards the city via the suburbs of Hamilton and Bowen Hills. In 2016 the course was moved to Brisbane City. The start line is in Spring Hill and participants cross three bridges before finishing in South Bank Parklands in South Brisbane. Since 2021, the race has used its original course again.

A recent addition has been the incorporation of a 5 kilometres (3.1 mi) race (from Breakfast Creek) starting later than the full 10 kilometres (6.2 mi) race, with some runners competing in both.

Originally the race was called the 'Bridge to Bay' and instead of heading from the Gateway Bridge towards Brisbane, it headed towards the coast line finishing at Manly. The end of the race was then moved to New Farm Park. In 2007 the roads in the suburbs of Fortitude Valley and New Farm became gridlocked. This traffic congestion prompted another change of moving the finish to the RNA Showgrounds.

== Participation ==
Year	Distances	Race registrants	Race finishers
2014	10 km, 5 km, Wheelie 10 km	28,418	23,821
2013	10 km, 5 km, Wheelie 10 km	41,504	34,262
2012	10 km, 5 km, Wheelie 10 km, Wheelie 5 km	39,881	33,263
2011	10 km, 5 km, Wheelie 10 km	42,546	34,147
2010	10 km, 5 km, Wheelie 10 km	37,743	31,983
2009	10 km, 5 km, Wheelie 10 km	45,247	37,282
2008	10 km, 5 km, Wheelie 10 km	35,842	30,314
2007	12 km, 4.5 km, Wheelie 12 km	28,272	23,791
2006	12 km, 4.5 km, Wheelie 12 km	23,514	21,072

== Results ==
Year	Men's winner	Time (m:s)	Women's winner	Time (m:s)	Major beneficiaries
2016	Jack Curran	30:14	Tara Gorman	35:22	
2015	Jackson Elliot	31:07	Cassie Fien	33:39	
2014	Harry Summers	29:32	Emma Jackson	34:13	
2013	Stephen Dinneen	30:40	Clare Geraghty	35:56	
2012	Benjamin Ashkettle	30:10	Clare Geraghty	34:57	
2011	Reuben Kosgei	29:37	Cassandra Fien	34:12	Legacy Australia
2010	Michael Shelley	29:35	Cassandra Fien	33:54	Autism Queensland
2009	Michael Shelley	29:32	Lisa Flint	35:18	Heart Foundation
2008	Scott Westcott	30:45	Rowan Baird	34:16	Youngcare
2007	Dickson Marwa	34:46	Rina Hill	40:55	Surf Life Saving Australia
2006	Dickson Marwa	35:31	Felicity Abram	41:19	Hear and Say Centre, Cerebral Palsy League of Queensland, Lions Club of Macgregor, Rotary Club of the Port of Brisbane and the SES
2005	Patrick Nyangelo	-			
2004	Patrick Nyangelo	-			
2003	Patrick Nyangelo	-			
2002	Andrew Wilson	-			
2001	Darren Wilson	33.44			

== See also ==
- List of largest footraces
