= New Farm Park =

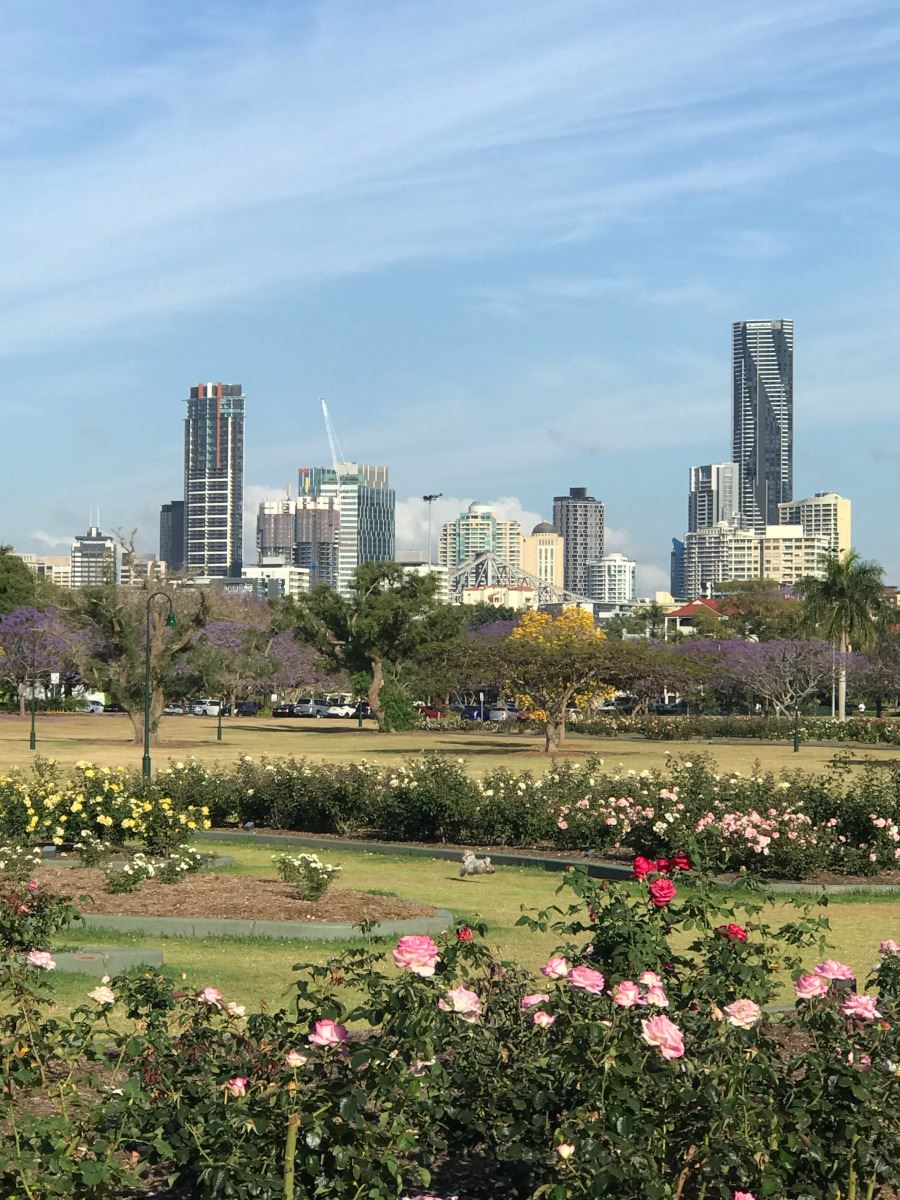
- New Farm Park looking towards the Brisbane central business district, 2021

- Location within Queensland
- 27.4692°S 153.0512°E
- Location: 137 Sydney Street, New Farm, City of Brisbane, Queensland, Australia

History
- Design period: 1900–1914 (Early 20th century)
- Built: 1914–1950, 1915, 1950, 1955

Site notes
- Architect: Albert Herbert Foster

Queensland Heritage Register
- Official name: New Farm Park
- Type: state heritage
- Designated: 7 February 2005
- Reference no.: 602402
- Type: Recreation and entertainment: Picnic ground/recreation reserve
- Theme: Building settlements, towns, cities and dwellings: Planning and form of settlements; Creating social and cultural institutions: Sport and recreation
- Builders: Gladwin Legge & Co.

New Farm Park is a heritage-listed riverfront public park at 137 Sydney Street, New Farm, City of Brisbane, Queensland, Australia. It was designed by Albert Herbert Foster and built from 1914 to 1950 by Gladwin Legge & Co. It was added to the Queensland Heritage Register on 7 February 2005.

The park covers 15 hectares (37 acres) and is at the southeastern end of the New Farm peninsula on a bend in the Brisbane River. The Powerhouse arts centre is at the eastern end of the park. The park includes the New Farm Park ferry wharf and links to the Brisbane Riverwalk from Newstead to Toowong. It is one of Brisbane's most popular parklands and tourist attractions.

== History ==
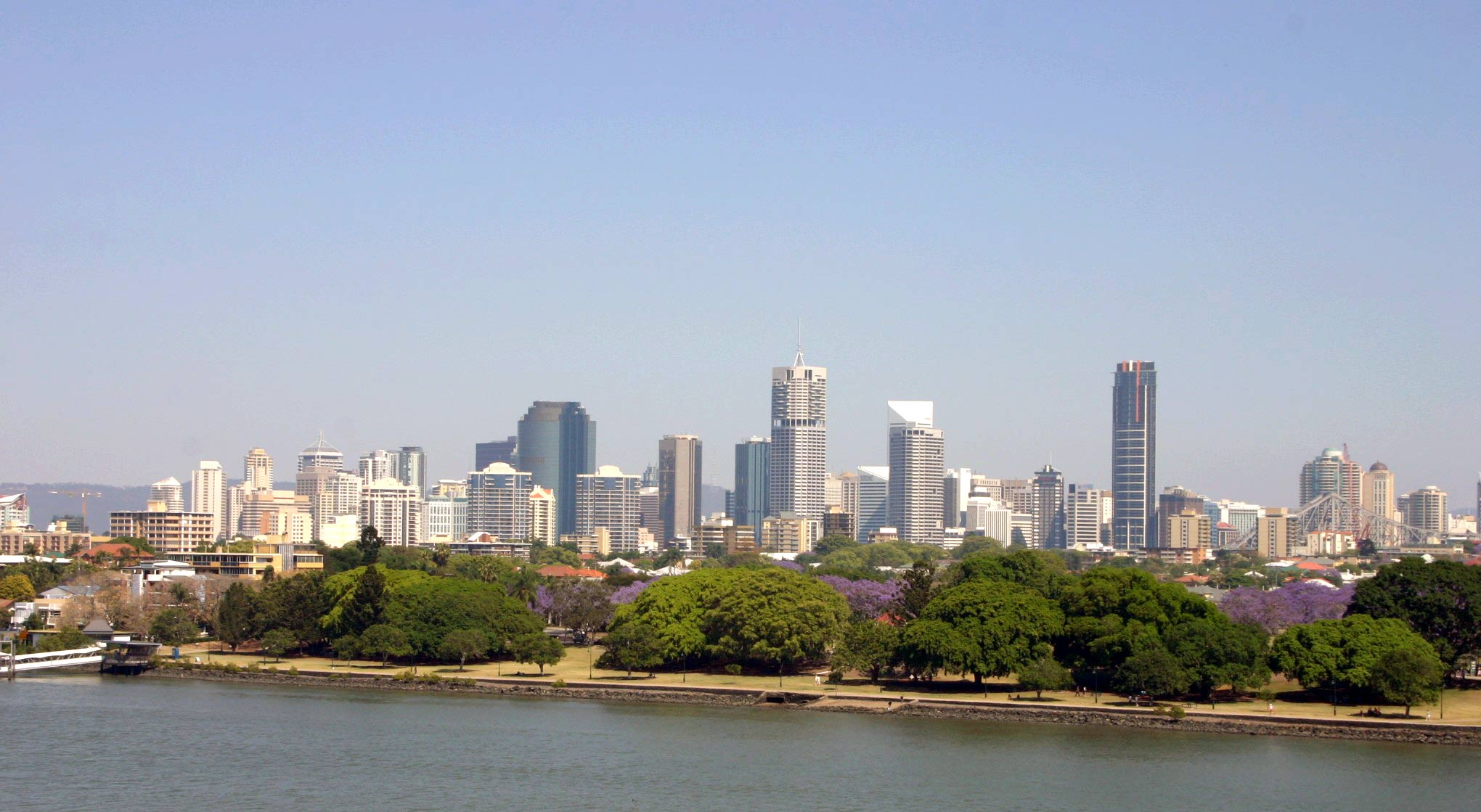
View across the Brisbane River to New Farm Park with the Brisbane CBD skyline in the background, 2006

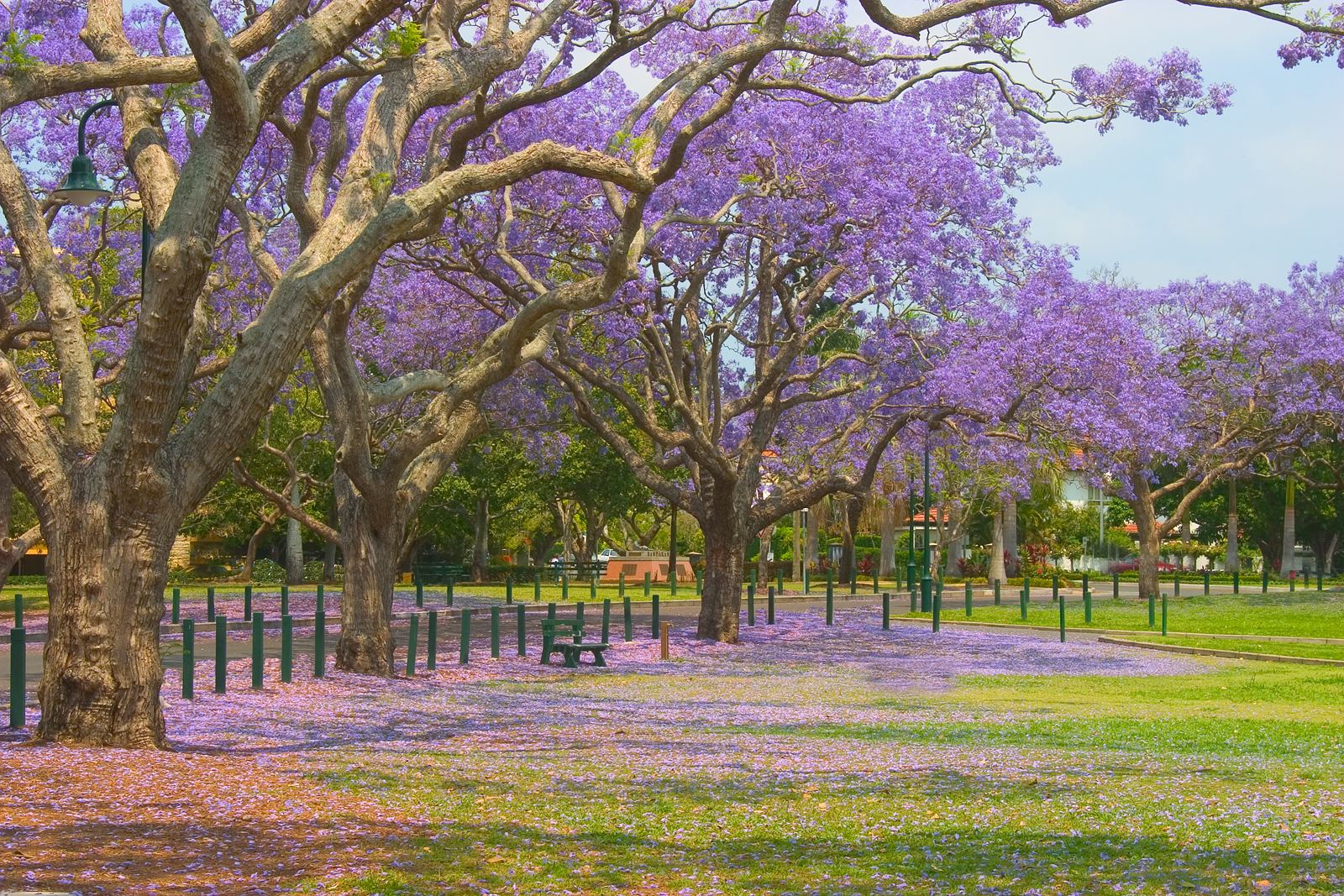
Jacarandas in bloom at New Farm Park

New Farm Park, created in 1914, currently covers 15.0076 hectares (37.085 acres) of land, and is bounded by Brunswick Street and Sydney Street, New Farm. It adjoins the Brisbane Powerhouse arts precinct and the Brisbane River.

Prior to European settlement, the New Farm area was covered with bush and dotted with shallow lagoons. It supported a variety of wildlife and proved a bountiful resource to local Aborigines. The area was called Binkin-ba meaning place of the land tortoise.

Following the founding of the Moreton Bay convict settlement on the Brisbane River, the land on which the park now stands was initially a farm. A racecourse was built on the site in 1846, which operated until 1913, when the land for the park was acquired by the Brisbane City Council. The Queensland Governor Hamilton Goold-Adams conducted the official opening of the park, which was delayed until July 1919 because of World War I.

After a penal settlement was founded in 1825 at the location of the current Brisbane central business district, food was grown on cleared land in South Brisbane and the present City Botanical Gardens. In 1827 Captain Patrick Logan ordered the clearing of a new farm between the present day Merthyr Road and the river; drainage canals were dug, and convict labourers grew maize, potatoes, pumpkin, and corn. The convicts were marched to work each day from their main barracks in town, following a track on high ground that later became Moray Street. Due to the decline of the penal settlement following changes in British policy, free settlement began in Brisbane in 1842. A farmer named Prendegast appears to have planted maize at the new farm in 1842, although he was only leasing the land.

Speculators in 1844 purchased the new farm's lowlands, and tenant farming followed, with dairying and small crops. Early resident Richard Jones acquired 93 acres (38 ha) in 1847, and called it "New Farm". Later Jones would become the first Brisbane person to be a Member in the New South Wales Legislative Council (prior to the separation of Queensland in 1859).

In 1846 the Moreton Bay Jockey Club moved its annual race from Coopers Plains to land at New Farm owned by Thomas Adams. This land included Eastern Suburban Allotments 22, 28, 29 and 30, located at the south-eastern corner of the New Farm peninsula. The first (members only) meeting was held in May 1846, and public attendance began at the 1848 three-day race meeting. By 1849 the "Brisbane Races" were being held over the Christmas-New Year's period. The race meetings moved to Eagle Farm in 1861.

Opinions vary as to the exact location of the racetrack itself. During the 1880s the land once owned by Thomas Adams was marketed for subdivision as the "Old Racecourse Estate", but allotments 28 to 30 included both the site of New Farm Park, as well as the land to the north of the small creek that formed the park's north-eastern boundary. In 1895, Merthyr Road was known as "Old Racecourse Road", and in 1913 the annual report of Henry Moore referred to the "old racecourse paddock" that was to become "New Farm Park". A 1925 aerial photo (John Oxley Library) appears to show the remains of the track on the site of the Colonial Sugar Refining Company Refinery and the site of the Powerhouse, intersected by Lamington Street near the river.

As horse racing disappeared from the area, suburban Brisbane was growing. The Municipality of Brisbane was formed in 1859, and the small farms of New Farm gave way in the 1870s to the residences of Brisbane's elite. Sir Samuel Griffith purchased 80 acres (32 ha) bounded by Sydney Street and Moray Street in 1870, and built his residence "Merthyr" in 1881 (demolished 1963).

Low-density residential development was also occurring in James Street, Brunswick Street, and Bowen Terrace by 1879. In 1884, suburban development was mainly contained within the Moray Street, Merthyr Road, and James Street area. Many estates were subdivided during the 1880s speculative boom, but they were not necessarily built on. This included the old racecourse lands, which had been resumed by the Australian Bank of Commerce. They were marketed as the "Russell Association Lands" in 1887, and the remaining subdivisions were offered for sale as the "Old Racecourse Estate" in 1888–89. The Colonial Sugar Refinery was built on part of this land in 1893.

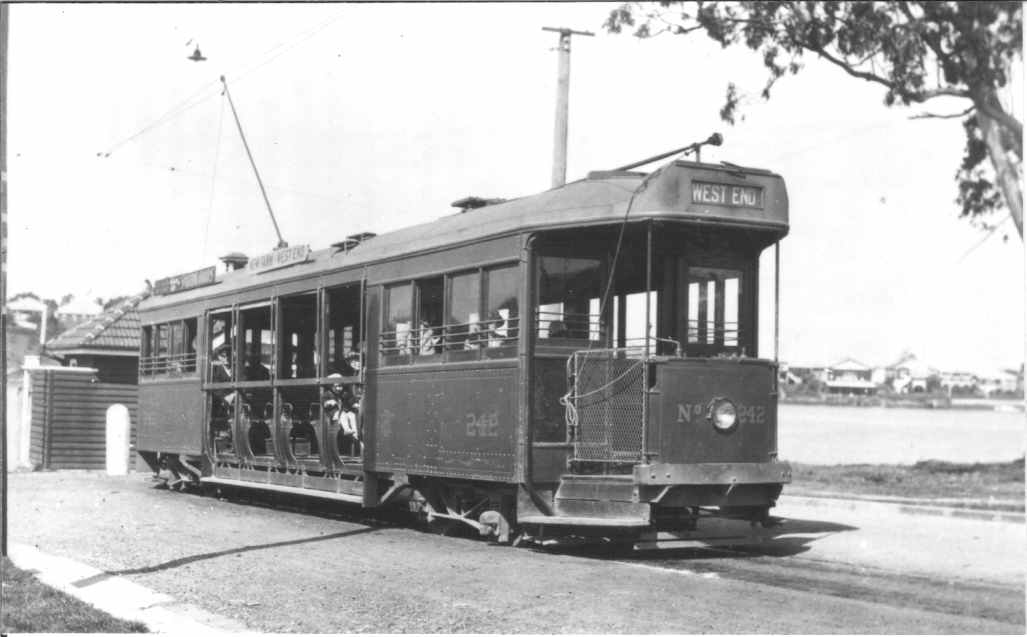
Brisbane Dropcentre Tram No.242 at the New Farm Ferry terminus, 1925

Horse-drawn trams had extended their run along Brunswick Street to Langshaw Street by December 1885, the electrification of trams occurred after 1895, and the trams reached New Farm Park in 1926. Portions of New Farm's swamps were drained between 1884 and 1887, and open stone drains were built on the eastern side of the peninsula, being diverted along Merthyr Road to the river. The City of Brisbane absorbed the Booroodabin Shire in 1903, and finished the job of draining the area between 1903 and 1909.

In 1884 Nehemiah Bartley wrote a letter to the Brisbane Courier on the need for a recreation reserve for New Farm's growing population, but negotiations for a park at New Farm did not begin until 1911. By 1912, about 37 acres (15 ha) 1 rood 8 perches (1,200 m^{2}) of the Old Racecourse Estate remained unsold, the land lying to the south west of the small creek that entered the river at Norris Point. In June 1913 the Australian Bank of Commerce accepted the City's offer of £25,800 for the land.

The Brisbane City Council had been seeking control of the parks within its area to replace the previous system where a board of trustees was established to administer each park; these boards were reported to the Queensland Governor and not within the Council's control). Between 1887 and 1913 the Council gained full control of Wickham Park, Observatory Park, Hardgrave Park (Petrie Terrace), Babbage Park (Musgrave Road, Red Hill), Albert Park, Alexandra Park (now part of the Brisbane Showgrounds between Alexandria Street and Exhibition Street) and Victoria Park. The International Town Planning movement that existed at the time also helped to put city planning and beautification programmes on the city's agenda. Between 1913 and 1925, Bowen Park, New Farm Park, Raymond Park, Newstead Park, Perry Park, Centenary Park and Teneriffe Park were created.

In his Annual Report for 1914, City Parks Superintendent Henry Moore noted that work had begun at New Farm Park on the 18 May 1914. According to Moore, a main drive, over 1,000 yards (910 m) in length and varying from 33 to 60 feet (10 to 18 m) wide, had been formed and prepared for gravelling, as had 950 yards (870 m) of pedestrian walks, at 9 feet (2.7 m) wide. The drive and walks were later laid with white Nundah gravel. Two lagoons, one with 2 islands and one with three islands, had been dug to a depth of 2 feet 6 inches (0.76 m), with 800 cubic yards (610 m^{3}) of earth being removed and used to fill in an offset from the river that extended 200 yards (180 m) into the park. Two acres (0.81 ha) had been trenched throughout to a depth from 1–2 feet (0.30–0.61 m) for an ornamental flower garden, and 14 circular beds from 50–60 feet (15–18 m) in diameter had been trenched to 2 feet (0.61 m) deep, ready to plant. 386 feet (118 m) of earthenware pipes had been laid to drain the lower lagoon into an offset from the river, and 500 holes for trees, plants, shrubs, had been prepared. 650 trees, plants, shrubs had been planted, and 3 acres (1.2 ha) of low-lying and swampy ground filled to a depth of 18 inches (460 mm) and grassed. Five and a half acres of undulating ground had been graded in readiness for rolling out a sports ground. Over 100 jacarandas had been planted around the drive, and poincianas had been planted in a continuous line from Sydney Street along Brunswick Street to the river. Flame trees were to have been planted behind the jacarandas, for a colour contrast, but these do not seem to have eventuated.

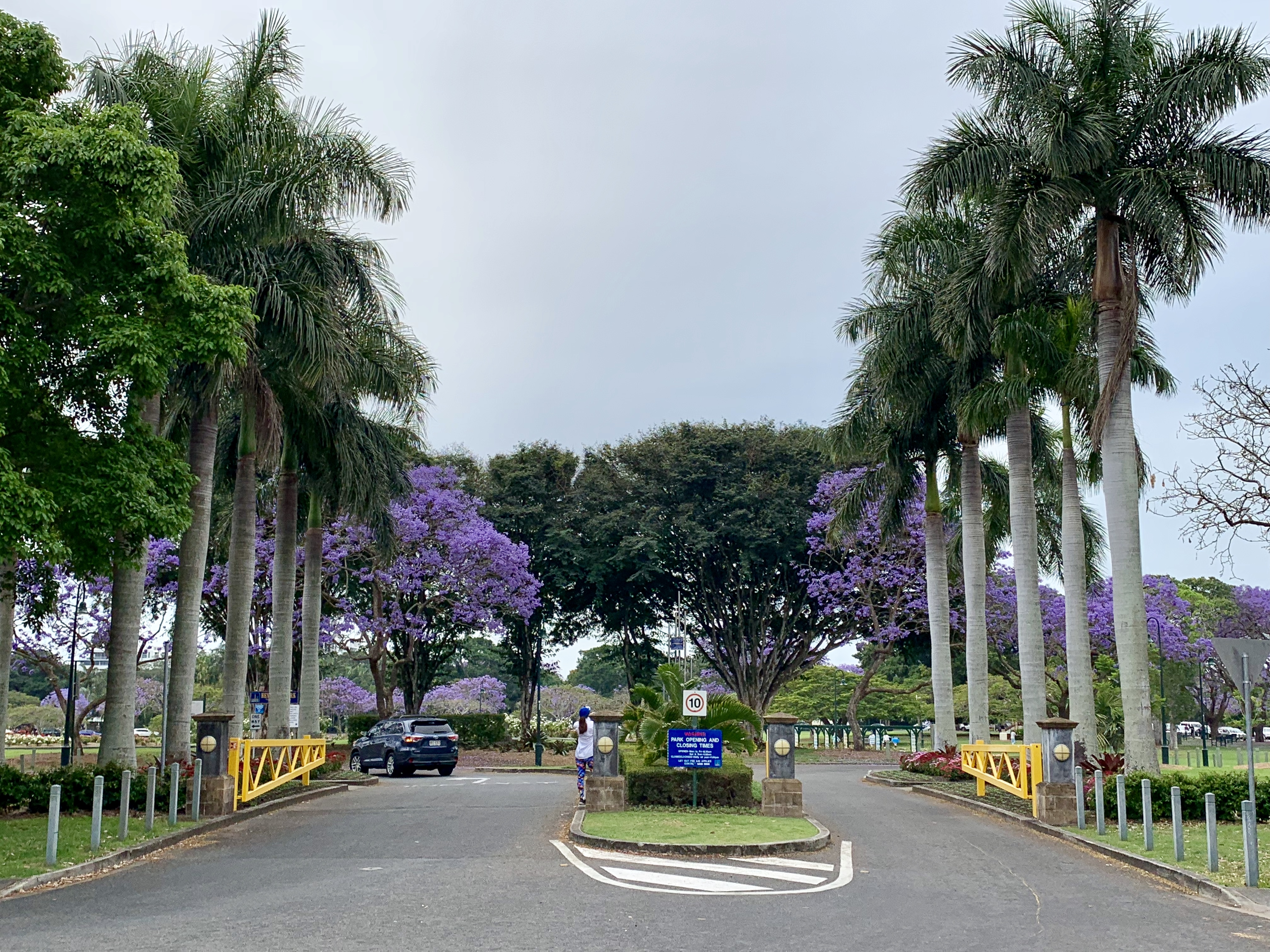
Vehicle entrance to the park

Poinsettias had been planted in three circular beds, and bougainvilleas had been planted on both sides of a 160-yard walk, which may have been the path seen running east–west across the centre of the park within the jacaranda drive in a 1925 aerial photograph. 100 palms and been planted, most transplanted from other parks. The main clusters of these palms lie to the south of the kiosk site; near the Powerhouse; along Brunswick Street between the poincianas; and either side of the two original pedestrian entrances from Brunswick Street, one opposite Elystan Street, and the other opposite Oxlade Drive. A double row of palms was also planted to the southeast of the original vehicle entrance for the drive, halfway between Sydney Street and Elystan Street, and which is currently closed to vehicles. The concrete stairway near the river was probably built around this time.

Negotiations occurred in September 1914 with Mr and Mrs Pemberthy, who agreed to closure of Russell Street (now Alford) between Sydney Street and Dixon Street, and inclusion of this land in the park, on the condition that an entrance was formed at the end of Dixon Street.

In 1915 a kiosk and bandstand were constructed in the park. Albert Herbert Foster, who became City Architect in 1913, designed both. Built in the Federation Queen Anne style, of timber with a Marseilles terracotta-tiled, bell-cast hip roof, the kiosk included accommodation for a lessee. The tender price of £598, from Tealby and Leitch, was accepted in September 1915, with the contract to be carried out within 10 weeks. Located between the tennis courts and croquet lawns, it addressed the circular drive and the central pleasure gardens. It was part of the formal park work began by the Brisbane City Council in 1914. Other facilities included a croquet lawn, picnic areas, cricket wickets, tennis courts and football grounds.

The bandstand in the shape of a rotunda was also built in the Federation Queen Anne style. In July 1915 the £359 tender of Legge, Gladwin and Co was accepted, construction to take 6 weeks. Until the kiosk burnt down in 2000, it was one half of the last surviving kiosk-bandstand related group in Queensland. A kiosk and bandstand were built in Albert Park in 1911, a bandstand at Bowen Park (1914), and kiosks were built in the City Botanic Gardens, Moora Park (Sandgate) and Mount Coot-tha Lookout.

In 1916 two concrete cricket wickets and 2 football grounds were completed at the north-western side of New Farm Park, and a croquet site was selected in the northeast. The croquet lawns were to form a break in the belt of trees on the park's north-eastern boundary, and until recently hedges always screened the lawns. Seven tennis courts were completed in 1917. However, World War I delayed an official opening for the park. At the opening of 20 July 1919, conducted by Governor Gould-Adams, Mayor Charles Buchanan noted that the park had been created because the city was deficient in "lungs". 800 rose bushes had been planted, as well as fig trees and Chinese elms along the northern boundary and the river. Some figs were also planted around the drive, mainly on its southern side.

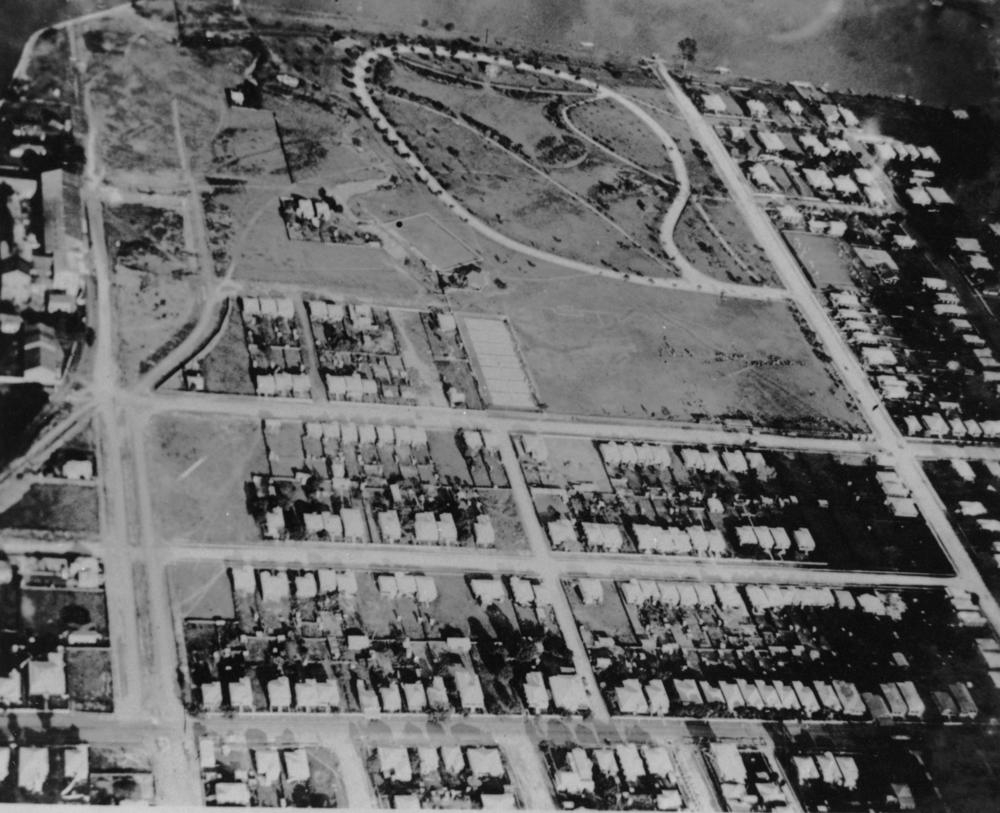
Aerial view of New Farm Park, circa 1925

In 1920 Edward, Prince of Wales, visited the park, and the Bougainvillea Avenue was renamed the "Prince's Walk". In August 1922 two war trophies were added to the park: a 5.9" German Howitzer, captured by the 26th Battalion east of Amiens in 1918, and an Albatross aircraft, one of the many German aircraft surrendered to Britain at the end of the war. The Howitzer was mounted in the south-western corner of the park, between the concrete steps and the powerhouse, until its removal to the Crosby nursery in 1955 due to the deterioration of its wheels. The Albatross was kept in a shelter nearby, and was removed in 1931. The shelter appears to have still existed in 1955.

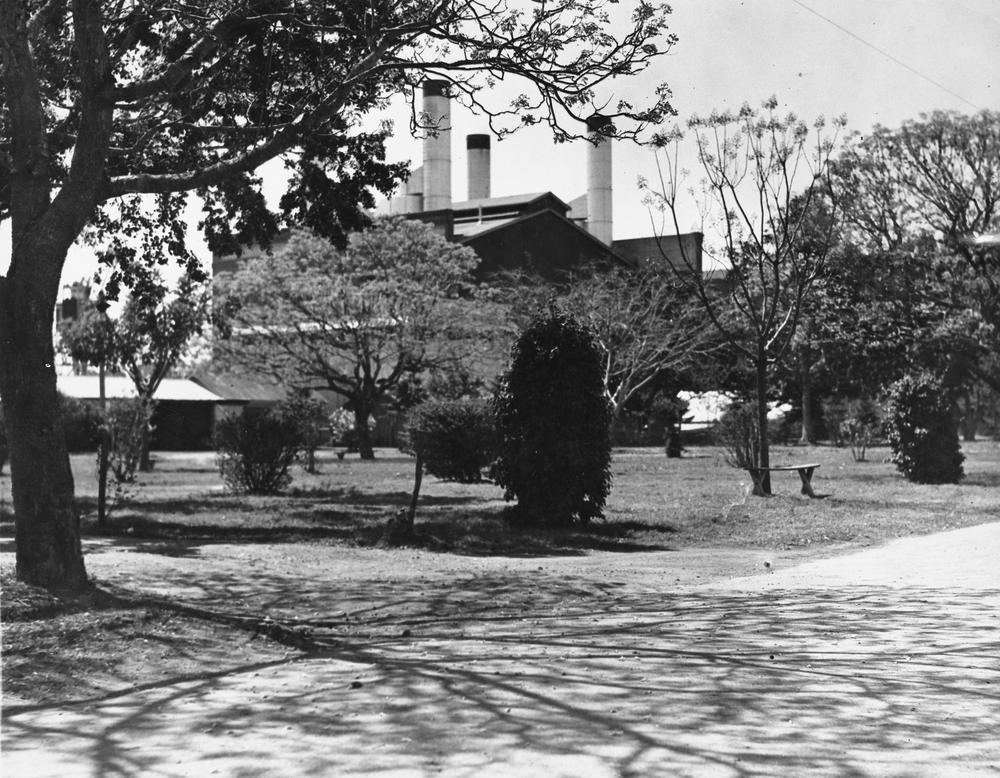
The tramway powerhouse seen from New Farm Park, 1936

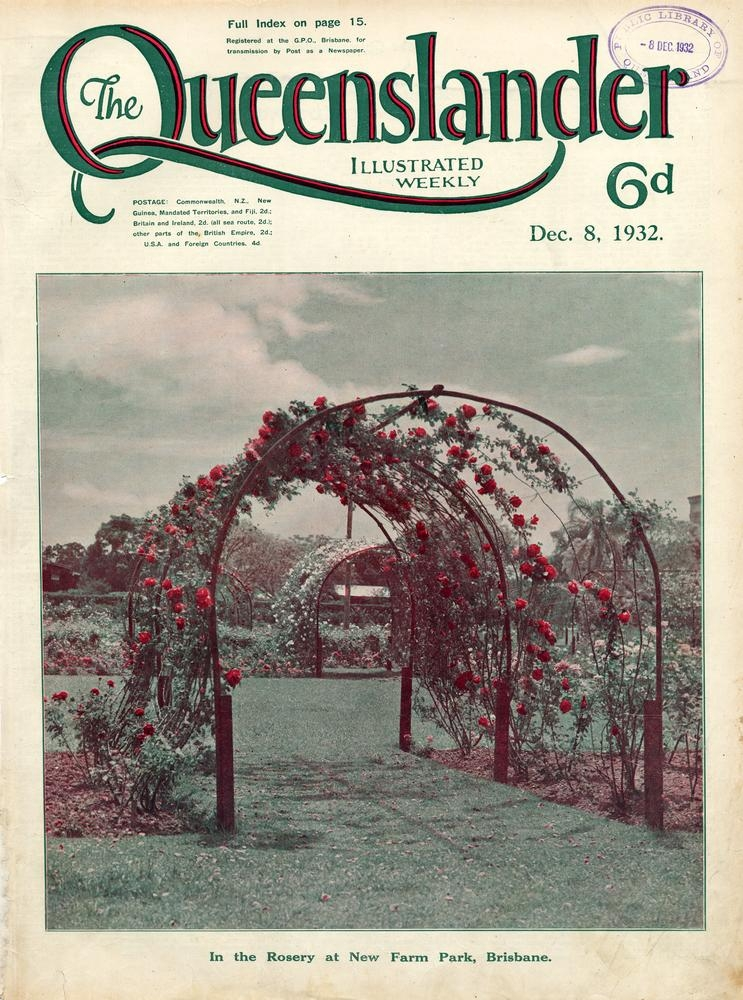
Rose gardens, 1932

The small creek that formed the park's original north-eastern boundary was filled in over time. In 1917 a Brisbane City Council minute called for it to be filled as far as the drain from the kiosk. The creek was still present on a 1921 map, but in January 1922 a Brisbane City Council minute noted that the watercourse on the park's northern boundary had been reclaimed, and that a new boundary fence was required due to the addition of CSR land to the park. In September 1921 the CSR Refinery planned to extend Lamington Street to the river, which would cut off part of New Farm Park, but the company offered allotments in Richardson Street and Cowley Street, where the playground is today, as compensation. When the Brisbane Tramway Powerhouse (decommissioned in 1971) was built in 1927–1928 straddling the site of the creek, it occupied some undeveloped parkland, and the present boundary of New Farm Park was thus set by 1927. To screen the Powerhouse, some trees were planted in the 1930s, but they have since been removed.

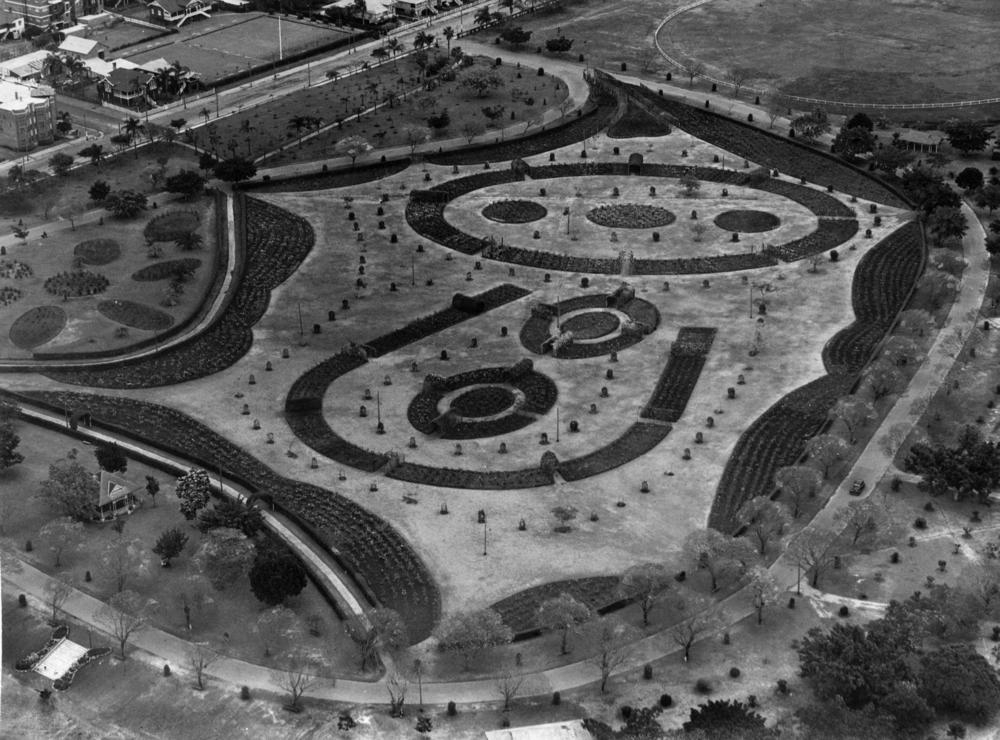
Aerial view, 1937

In 1935 the main drive was sealed with bitumen to reduce the dust problem, but a shelter for a visitor's book that was proposed the same year did not eventuate. In 1938 it was decided to create a proper cricket oval, with land filling to the level of Sydney Street, although this would only contain one football field. Two dressing sheds were built near the oval in 1938, and basketball courts were constructed 1938–1939, around the tennis courts that existed in the northern corner of the park- currently the library's carpark. In 1940 it was proposed to remove the bougainvillea hedge (visible in a 1937 aerial photo) from around the rose gardens, and to plant more jacarandas around the drive. There were supposedly 20,000 rose bushes in the park by 1940, according to the Queensland Government Tourist Bureau. The old rose bed design of Moore's can be clearly seen in a 1937 aerial photograph, but by 1946 this design was a ghost of its former self.

Harry Oakman (1906–2002) conducted the first major redesign of the park from 1948 onwards, with a new rose garden layout being developed by 1953. Oakman had been Head Gardener, Department of Parks, for Newcastle City Council from 1940 to 1946, and was Manager of Parks and Gardens for the Brisbane City Council from 1946 to 1963. He later worked in Canberra, and wrote seven books on tropical and sub-tropical gardening.

Oakman added new pedestrian paths in a loop inside the main drive, lookouts over the rose gardens, and planted new trees and shrubs, while maintaining most of the original tree plantings. A rose pergola was built in 1954, between the Oxlade Drive entrance and the bandstand, a children's playground was constructed in 1955 (later upgraded in 1962 and 1987). A new vehicle entrance was formed opposite Oxlade Drive in 1958–59. A new croquet clubhouse appears to have been built between 1952 and 1955, along with new toilets. A shed was also constructed south of the kiosk by 1951. A memorial drinking fountain honouring Mrs Henry Robertson, founder of Junior Red Cross, was built in 1948. It was later damaged and was removed, being replaced in 1968 at Mrs Robertson's request.

However, Oakman's main triumph was his redesign of the rose beds. He believed that the roses should be organised by variety and colour, so that the public could be educated on the subject. In 1953 Henry Moore criticised Oakman's approach, but Oakman responded that the "loss" of roses that Moore was concerned about was simply an ongoing process of replacing old bushes with new plantings, better organised. Oakman also noted that 30-odd years of incompetent management had led Brisbane's parks to their current state of "dereliction". In October 1947 Oakman had been critical of the Brisbane City Council's practice of cutting roses to supply council offices, pointing out that 5656 dozen blooms had been appropriated over the previous year.

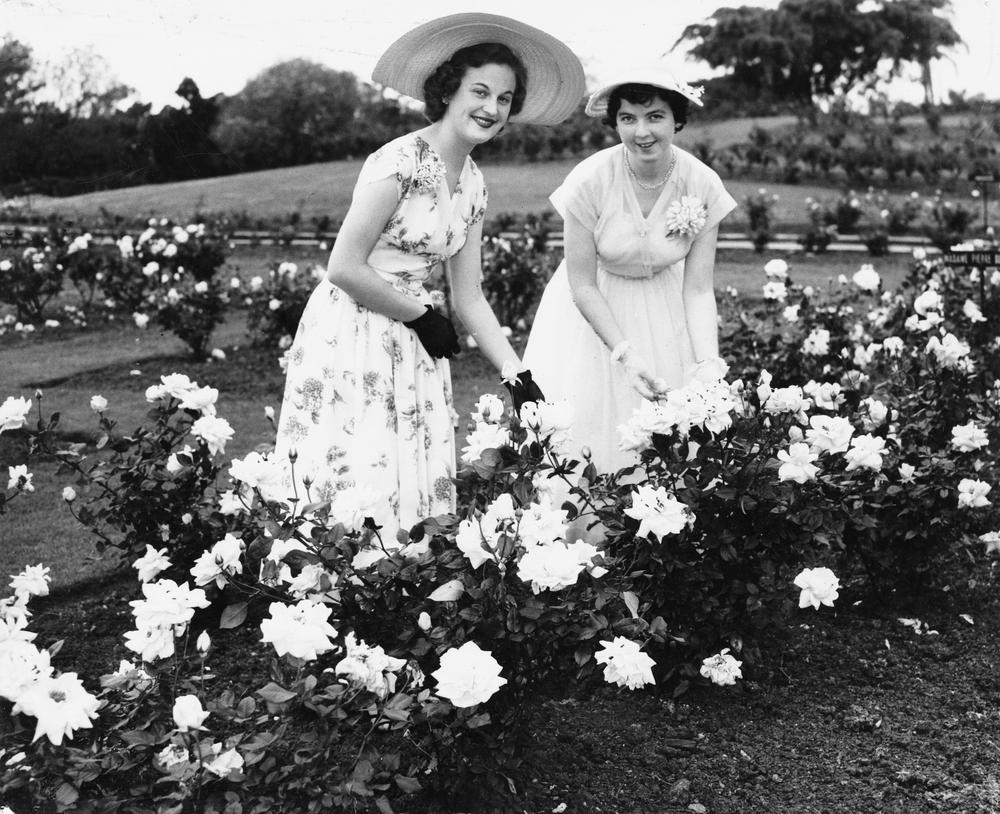
Ladies admiring the rose garden, 1954

A 1950 planting list included 2,500 rose plants, and by September 1953 a total stock of 5,325 bushes is listed in Brisbane City Council reports. This figure increased to 10,227 by 1957. Some Brisbane City Council sources claim that 11,000 bushes of 300 varieties were planted in 1962, although another Brisbane City Council source claims that this was the total stock at the time. An article in the Telegraph, 6 March 1965, claimed that there were 40,000 roses bushes in New Farm Park, which made it one of Australia's top three rose gardens. After the 1974 flood covered the rose beds in up to 5 centimetres (2.0 in) of toxic silt, 4,000 new rose bushes were ordered in 1974, and 3,000 more in 1975.

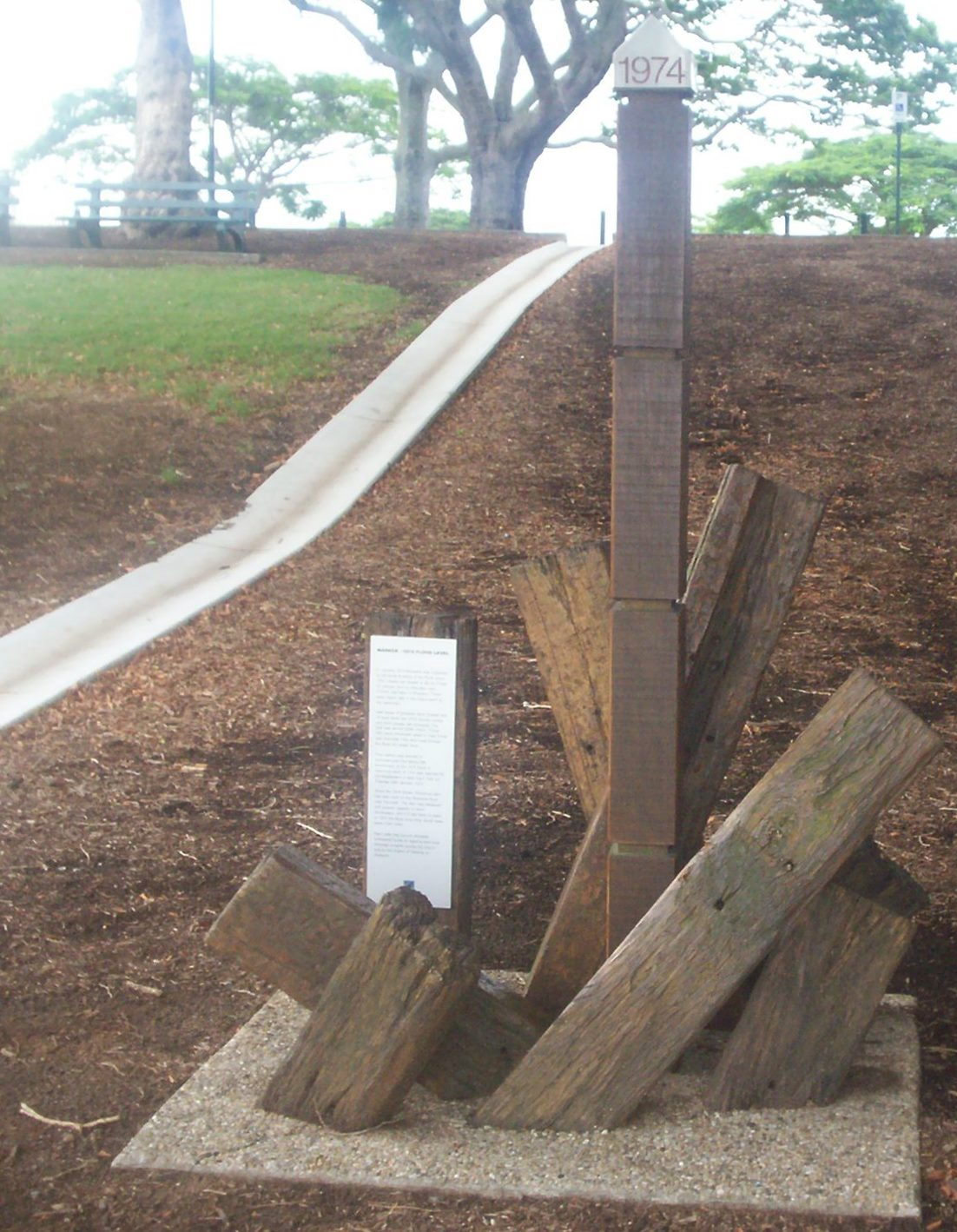
Water level marker commemorating 1974 Brisbane Flood

A library was also built in the Park in 1975, despite local opposition to the loss of open space. A report by the Queensland Conservation Council released that year claimed that Brisbane's parks were, in general, often flat, lacking in trees and natural water features, and had too much emphasis on built-recreation facilities. The report argued that too many buildings, sports clubs, car parks, and roads all defeated the purpose of parks as open spaces.

In 1969 a new sports clubhouse was built, and in 1979 a clock tower and time capsule, for Rotary International's 75th anniversary, was installed near the Oxlade Drive vehicle entrance. In 1984, a light German field gun was removed from the playground to go to the 2/14 Light Horse Regiment's museum. Captured by the Light Horse in Palestine in World War I, the gun had been sited by the Sandgate pier from 1923 onwards. At some point it had come to rest in New Farm Park.

A 1991 study by R.J. Dobbs (Brisbane City Council parks management officer) found that the most popular areas of the park were the playground, barbeques, oval and bandstand. The main usage groups in 1991, according to Dobbs, included mothers and children, the handicapped and elderly, joggers and exercisers, tourists, picnic groups, wedding parties, social functions, and sports groups.

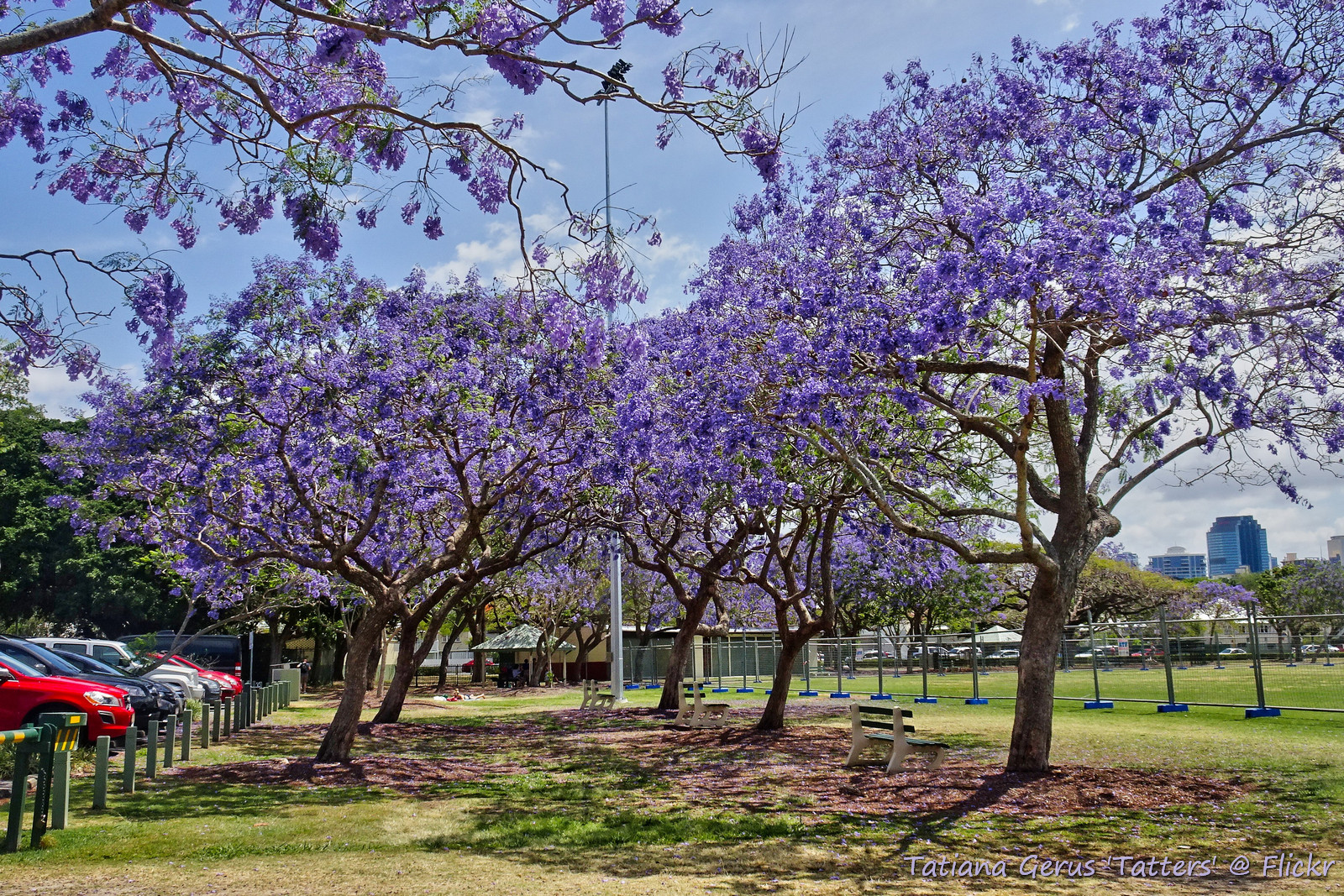
Jacarandas in New Farm Park, October 2016

Since a 1991 concept plan was developed for the park, jacarandas have been planted around the oval, a rainforest walk and a half basketball court has been established behind the library, and more picnic tables and barbeques have been added near the river. A path has been built between the kiosk site and the playground, running between the croquet lawns and the drive; the park has been linked to the Brisbane Powerhouse arts precinct, the Oxlade Drive entry has been upgraded, and a new pedestrian entry has been created at the corner of Sydney Street and Brunswick Street. Interpretive history signs have also been added at places in the park. Two tennis courts and a shelter were built on one half of the croquet lawns after 2001. A new New Farm ferry terminal was built, and in 2004 controversy has surrounded plans to build a new, larger kiosk to replace the 1915 kiosk destroyed in 2000.

Features that have been lost over time include the bougainvillaea planted around the rose gardens (gone between 1940–1946); the two lagoons, and the east–west pedestrian path through the centre of the park (gone by 1937); the tennis courts and basketball courts lost when the library was built in 1975; two old dressing sheds near the oval; sightboards at the north-east and south-west sides of the oval; an iron gateway on the south-eastern side of the oval; two old toilets between the Dixon Street entrance and the croquet lawns, and the 1954 rose pergola. An arbour that replaced the latter has also been removed since 2001. The 5.9" memorial gun, the Albatross aircraft and its shelter, and a caretaker's cottage that once stood on the north-east boundary, north-west of the gardeners' depot, have also departed. In addition, the Oakman-era oval pathway inside the jacaranda drive, marked by the surviving mature poincianas, and most of Oakman's 1948–1953 rose gardens design, which was laid out within the circuit of the jacaranda drive, has disappeared. There was also a shelter just inside the loop road, on its northern side. The part of the surviving rose gardens that most closely resembles Oakman's original design is the large spiral near the bandstand. The original vehicle entrance is currently blocked to cars. In 2000, a four-month trial by the Brisbane City Council of an Aboriginal homeless shelter near the playground was ended by the Queensland Government. Dog toilets have also come and gone recently.

Current park use includes both active and passive use. Active use ranges from sports use, such as soccer, football, croquet, tennis, basketball and boules, to social events and festivals, playground use, weddings, and cycling and jogging. More passive uses include picnics, strolls through the gardens, listening to brass bands every second Sunday, and tourists visiting to witness the jacarandas bloom.

== Description ==
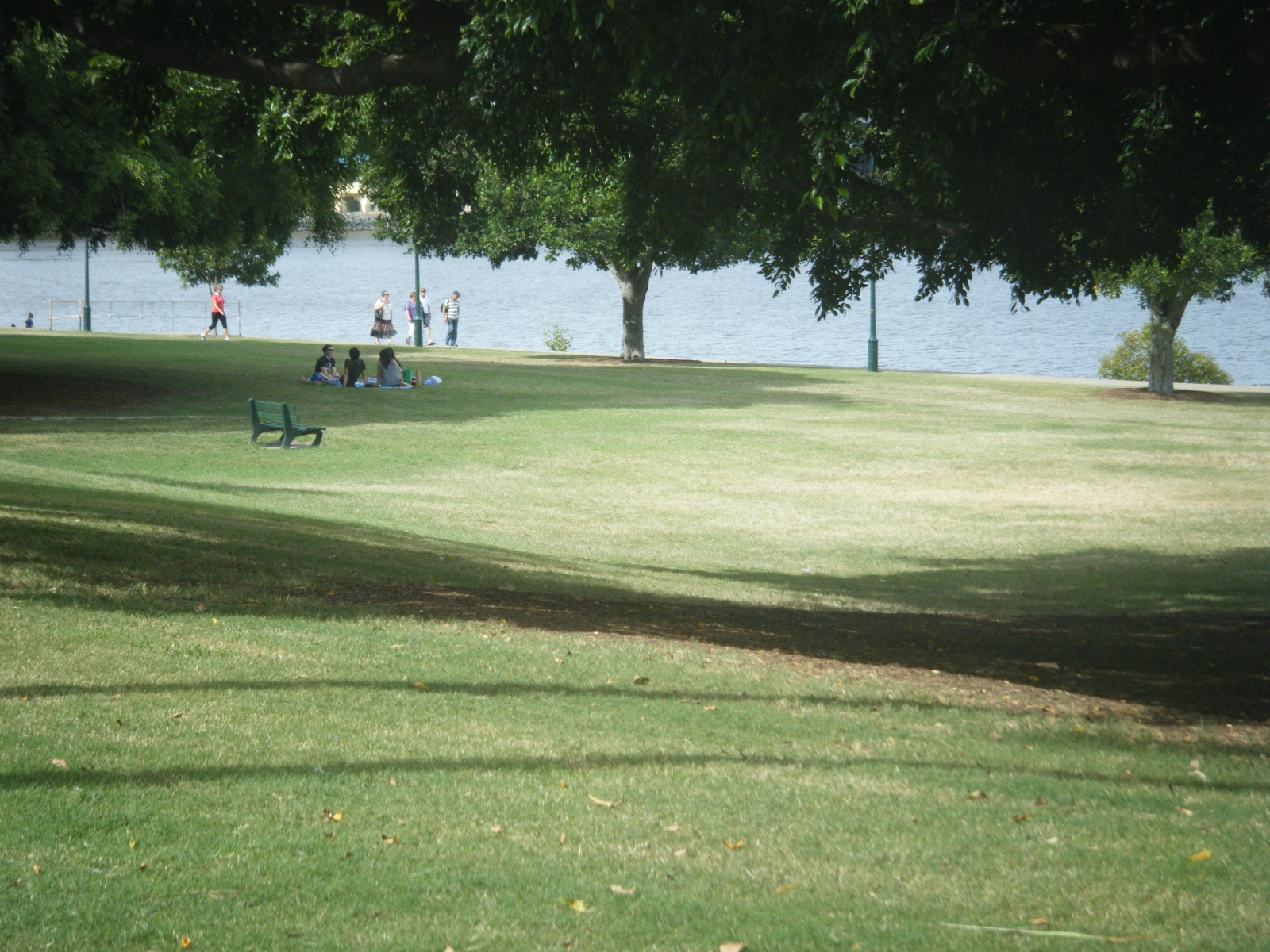
Lawns leading down to the river bank

The basic Edwardian layout of the park, designed by Henry Moore, remains largely intact today, along with remnants from the late 1940s/early 1950s garden redesign undertaken by Harry Oakman. Various structures and rose gardens have also come and gone, but many of the earlier tree plantings remain.

New Farm Park's 15.0076 hectares (37.085 acres) currently contains a wide variety of trees, both mature and recent plantings, including jacarandas, poincianas, figs, palms, and coral trees. The central lawn within the jacaranda drive contains the remnants of the post-1948 rose garden arrangements, and an area of rainforest has been planted behind the library. In the shade of the trees near the kiosk site is an understorey of tropical plants, a character of park planting that is a distinct aspect of Brisbane's historic parks and large gardens.

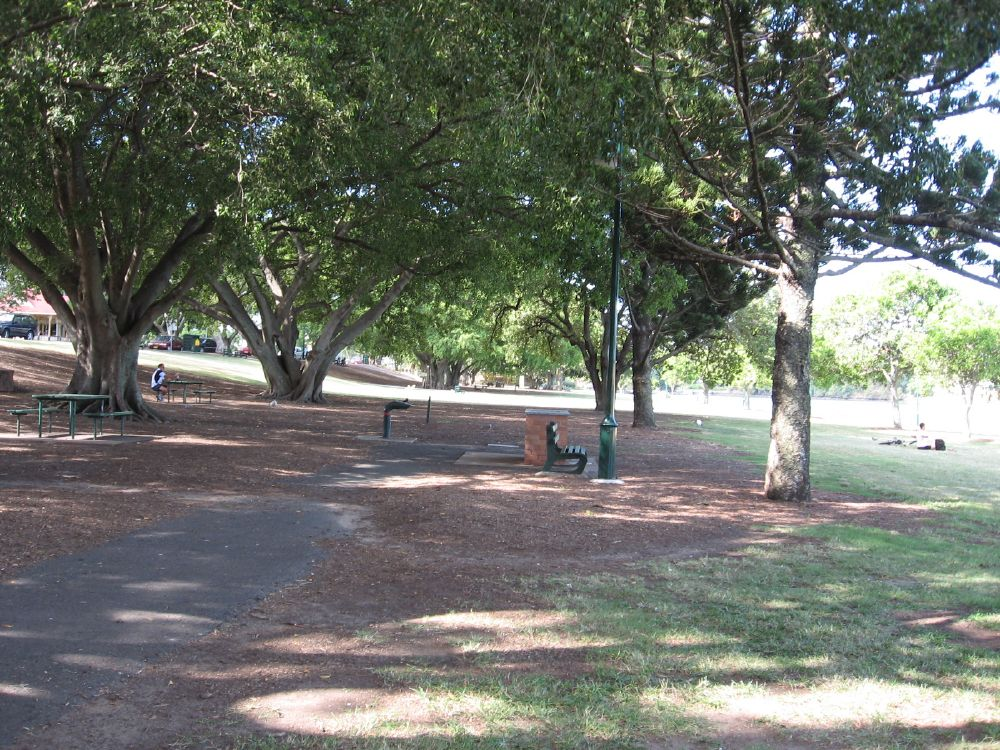
Picnic facilities

Vehicle access occurs at the Oxlade Drive entrance, and the Library carpark. The main pedestrian entrances are at Dixon Street, the corner of Sydney Street and Brunswick Street, the old vehicle entrance on Brunswick Street between Sydney Street and Elystan Street, a path opposite Elystan Street, and a path running from the site of the old ferry terminal at the end of Brunswick Street. The jacaranda drive still follows its original course, and two of the original footpath routes within the drive still exist, radiating out from near the Oxlade Drive vehicle entrance. A new path runs between the kiosk site and the playground, and another new path links New Farm Park to the Brisbane Powerhouse.

Facilities include a sports oval, a playground surrounded by mature banyan trees, picnic and barbeque areas near the river, a croquet lawn and two tennis courts, a library, a half basketball court, and a canoe and boat ramp on the river.

Other structures include three toilets, three small shade shelters near the oval, a post-World War II shed south of the kiosk site, a croquet clubroom, small shelters around the croquet lawn, a tennis court shelter, soccer clubroom, gardener's depot, bandstand, shelters in the playground, a large Marquee south of the kiosk site, interpretative history signs, and a concrete stairway near the river (1915). Sculptures have also been commissioned for the park, and the Sandakan Memorial has been built recently. A new ferry terminal has also been built adjacent to the park.

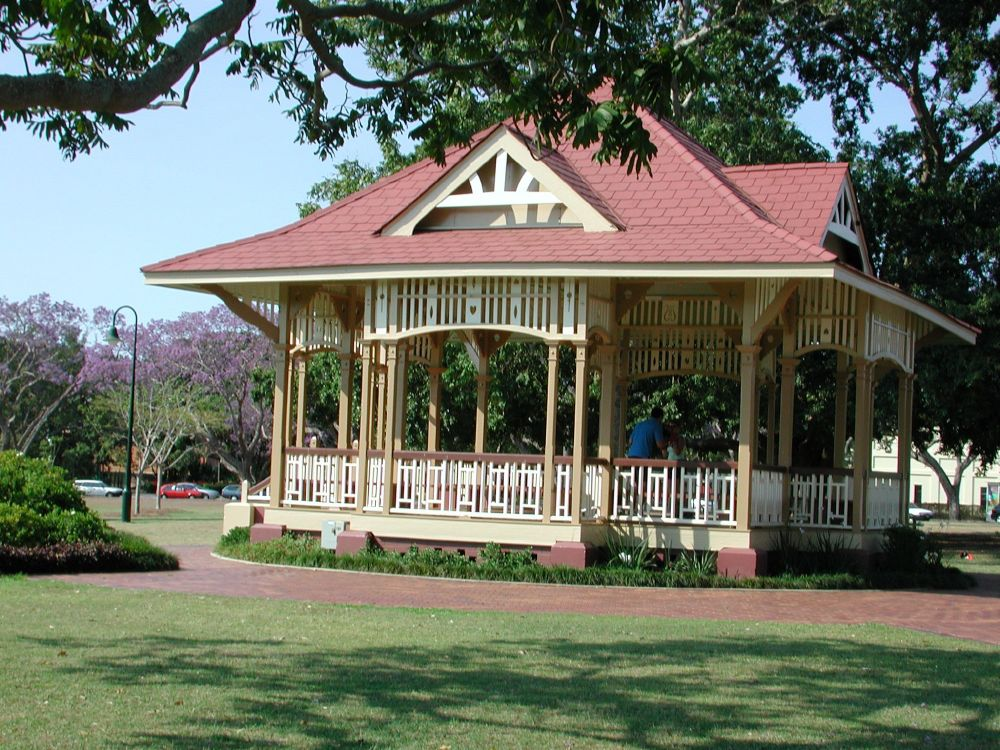
Bandstand looking east

The main features of historical interest from the 1914 to 1939 period include the remaining half of the croquet lawn, the concrete stairway near the river, the sports oval near Sydney Street, the jacaranda drive, and the two remaining paved paths within the drive loop. The Federation Queen Anne style bandstand, with tiled bell-cast hip roof, is of particular interest.

Post World War II features of interest include the remnants of Oakman's rose gardens design, the rectangular, hip-roofed masonry croquet clubhouse, and the post-war shed with tiled roof, which lies to the south of the kiosk site. This shed was an open picnic shelter until recently. The soccer clubroom by the sports oval also has an interesting mosaic mural on its northern side.

Besides the mature jacarandas and fig trees around the loop drive, other mature tree plantings of note include the various lines of palms, the weeping figs near the river, the banyan figs incorporated in the playground, the Queensland bottle trees shading the Brunswick Street barbeque area, poincianas along Brunswick Street and elsewhere, and remnants of Oakman's massed plantings of franpanis and bauhinias to form groves in a "wild woodland" manner.

== Events ==
For a number of years the park was the finish line for both the short and long races in the Bridge to Brisbane. The park is also the location for the Queensland Pride fair day.

== Transport ==
The park is accessible by CityCat ferry disembarking at the New Farm Park ferry wharf and by buses that run along Brunswick Street. There is car parking within the park and on adjacent streets.

== Heritage listing ==
New Farm Park was listed on the Queensland Heritage Register on 7 February 2005 having satisfied the following criteria.

The place is important in demonstrating the evolution or pattern of Queensland's history.

The changing land use in and around New Farm Park, from Aboriginal resource, to convict farm, from tenant farming to racecourse, from elite residences to suburban subdivision, and finally to parkland, demonstrates the evolution of Queensland's history, and the process of the creation of open spaces as an area's population grew. The Brisbane City Council's purchase of the land at New Farm reflected its interest in the international Town Planning movement of the time. Redesigns of the park also demonstrate changes in parks philosophy and use over time, with a shift in emphasis from genteel Edwardian ornamental gardens and leisure activities, to barbeques and jogging.

The place demonstrates rare, uncommon or endangered aspects of Queensland's cultural heritage.

The Edwardian 1915 bandstand is rare. The park itself can also be considered as a rare example of a new park being designed by Henry Moore, as his other projects involved redeveloping existing parkland (including Bowen and Newstead Parks). The remaining croquet lawn is also uncommon in Queensland.

The place is important in demonstrating the principal characteristics of a particular class of cultural places.

The Edwardian bandstand is a very fine example of its type.

The place is important because of its aesthetic significance.

The park's vistas, jacaranda drive, river frontage, rose gardens, subtropical shrubberies and mature trees including palms, figs and poincianas, demonstrate an established subtropical garden character and are well appreciated by the public.

The place is important in demonstrating a high degree of creative or technical achievement at a particular period.

The first Brisbane City Parks Superintendent (from 1912), Henry Moore, horticulturalist and landscape gardener, displayed a high degree of creativity in his initial design of New Farm Park. Features such as the jacaranda drive continue to impress the public. Harry Oakman, landscape architect, also displayed creativity in his post-1948 re-design of the park including the rose beds, although only a remnant of this rose garden design remains. Both men were also innovators in the field of tropical garden design.

The place has a strong or special association with a particular community or cultural group for social, cultural or spiritual reasons.

The park has a long-standing and strong association with the local community, including the post-war Italian community. The playground is very popular with local mothers and children, and festival organisers, wedding parties, sportspeople, the elderly, and picnickers use other parts of the park.

The place has a special association with the life or work of a particular person, group or organisation of importance in Queensland's history.

New Farm Park also has an association with the life and work of people of importance: Henry Moore, Harry Oakman, and Albert Herbert Foster, Brisbane's City Architect from 1913 to 1932.

== See also ==
- List of parks in Brisbane
