= La Scala, Fortitude Valley =

La Scala
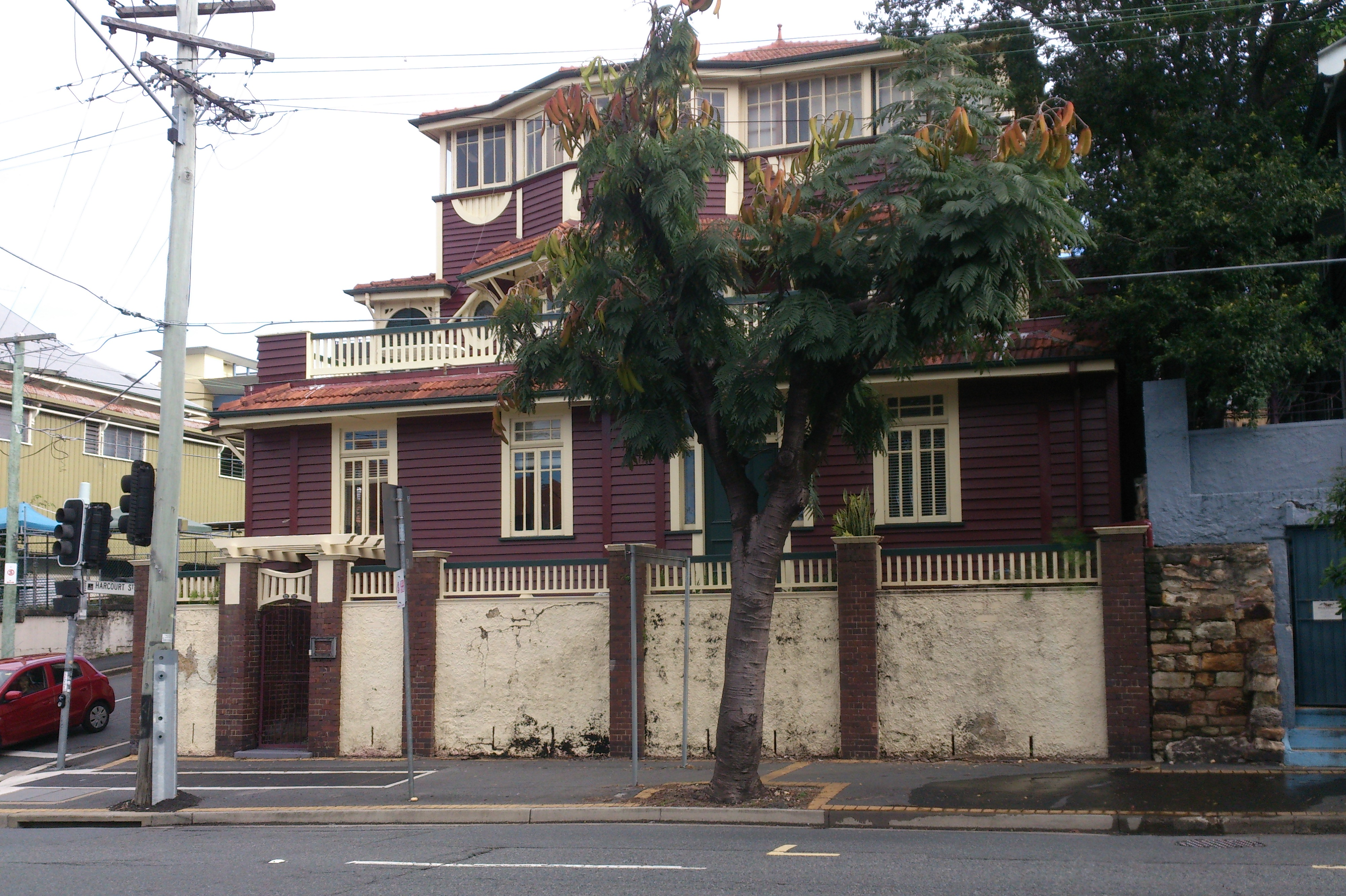

- Location within Queensland Location within Australia
- 27.4616°S 153.0387°E
- Location: 517 Brunswick Street, Fortitude Valley, City of Brisbane, Queensland, Australia

History
- Design period: 1914–1919 (World War I)
- Built: c. 1915

Site notes
- Architect: Thomas Ramsay Hall

Queensland Heritage Register
- Official name: La Scala, Craig Athol
- Type: state heritage (built)
- Designated: 21 October 1992
- Reference no.: 600207
- Significant period: 1910s (fabric); 1910s–1970s (historical)
- Significant components: consulting rooms, roof deck/terrace/promenade, wall/s – retaining, lead light/s, residential accommodation – doctor's house/quarters

La Scala is a heritage-listed detached house at 517 Brunswick Street, Fortitude Valley, City of Brisbane, Queensland, Australia. It was designed by Thomas Ramsay Hall and built c. 1915. It was originally known as Craig Athol. It was added to the Queensland Heritage Register on 21 October 1992.

== History ==
The three-storeyed timber house was built in 1914 for Dr Thomas Henry Reeve Mathewson to a design by architect Thomas Ramsay Hall. Mathewson named the house Craig Athol. He operated his practice from the ground floor and lived in the house above.

In 1923 he moved his practice to Wickham Terrace but continued to live in the house, renting out the ground floor to another doctor. The house and surgery were owned and occupied by a number of doctors over the years before being turned into flats in the 1970s. The original stables were demolished and a small addition was built on the rear of the house.

In 1980 the property was bought by Brisbane architect Robert Riddel who restored it and renamed it La Scala. The ground floor, which was enlarged in the 1980s, housed an architectural practice for some years until 1992 and is now divided into three separate tenancies.

== Description ==
La Scala is a three-storeyed timber building which sits on a narrow corner site overlooking Brunswick Street and has a hipped terracotta tiled roof with decorative finials.

The three levels are dissimilar in plan, and consist of offices on the ground floor and a single residence on each of the floors above linked via a stairwell bay. The building shows influences of a mixture of stylistic trends in the treatment of materials and the spatial organisation.

A roofdeck above the ground floor overlooks Brunswick Street and is surfaced with fibro tiles. The rear of the building sits on tall timber stumps and the perimeter has batten screens. The building is clad in weatherboard and features a bay window stairwell to the north.

There is a rough cast concrete and brick pier retaining wall to both street frontages. Entry to the ground floor is via a set of stairs built into the retaining wall on the northern side. Levels two and three are accessed via a timber stair and porch on the eastern side.

Verandahs on levels two and three have been enclosed with timber screens and an assortment of louvred, casement, sliding and hopper windows. Verandahs have solid weatherboard balustrading with inverted semicircular openings with batten infill.

Levels one and two have terracotta tile awnings with timber brackets. Two offices have been added to the rear of the ground level, and a rear bedroom and side bathroom, both with corrugated iron skillion roofs, have been added to level two.

The office foyer has an external timber door with glass sidelights and fanlight, and an internal timber door with decorative leadlight in the door, sidelights and fanlight.

The foyer to level two features decorative leadlight in the sidelights, fanlight and oval window. The internal timber stair balustrade consists of wide battens with a stylised tulip fretwork motif, and the bay has casement windows.

All public rooms on levels one and two feature decorative plaster ceilings, which vary in design from room to room. The lounge and dining rooms on level two, separated by a timber screen, have the most ornate ceilings consisting of borders of fruit.

Internal walls are single skin vertically jointed boards. Windows are mainly casement with fanlights above and French doors open onto verandahs and the front deck.

== Heritage listing ==
La Scala was listed on the Queensland Heritage Register on 21 October 1992 having satisfied the following criteria.

The place is important in demonstrating the evolution or pattern of Queensland's history.

La Scala is significant as it demonstrates innovative architectural ideas including the large roofdeck for outdoor living, the free planforms linked via the stairwell bay, and the stylistic innovation in the use of decorative elements and materials.

La Scala is significant for the unusual scale and form of the building and retaining walls and the contribution these elements make to the Brunswick Street streetscape. Also significant is the aesthetic quality of decorative elements including plaster ceilings, timber batten detailing, leadlight panels and timber work.

La Scala is significant as an example of the domestic work of architect TR Hall.

The place is important because of its aesthetic significance.

La Scala is significant for the unusual scale and form of the building and retaining walls and the contribution these elements make to the Brunswick Street streetscape. Also significant is the aesthetic quality of decorative elements including plaster ceilings, timber batten detailing, leadlight panels and timber work.

The place is important in demonstrating a high degree of creative or technical achievement at a particular period.

La Scala is significant as it demonstrates innovative architectural ideas including the large roofdeck for outdoor living, the free planforms linked via the stairwell bay, and the stylistic innovation in the use of decorative elements and materials.

The place has a special association with the life or work of a particular person, group or organisation of importance in Queensland's history.

La Scala is significant as an example of the domestic work of architect TR Hall.
