= Youngcare =

Australian nonprofit organization

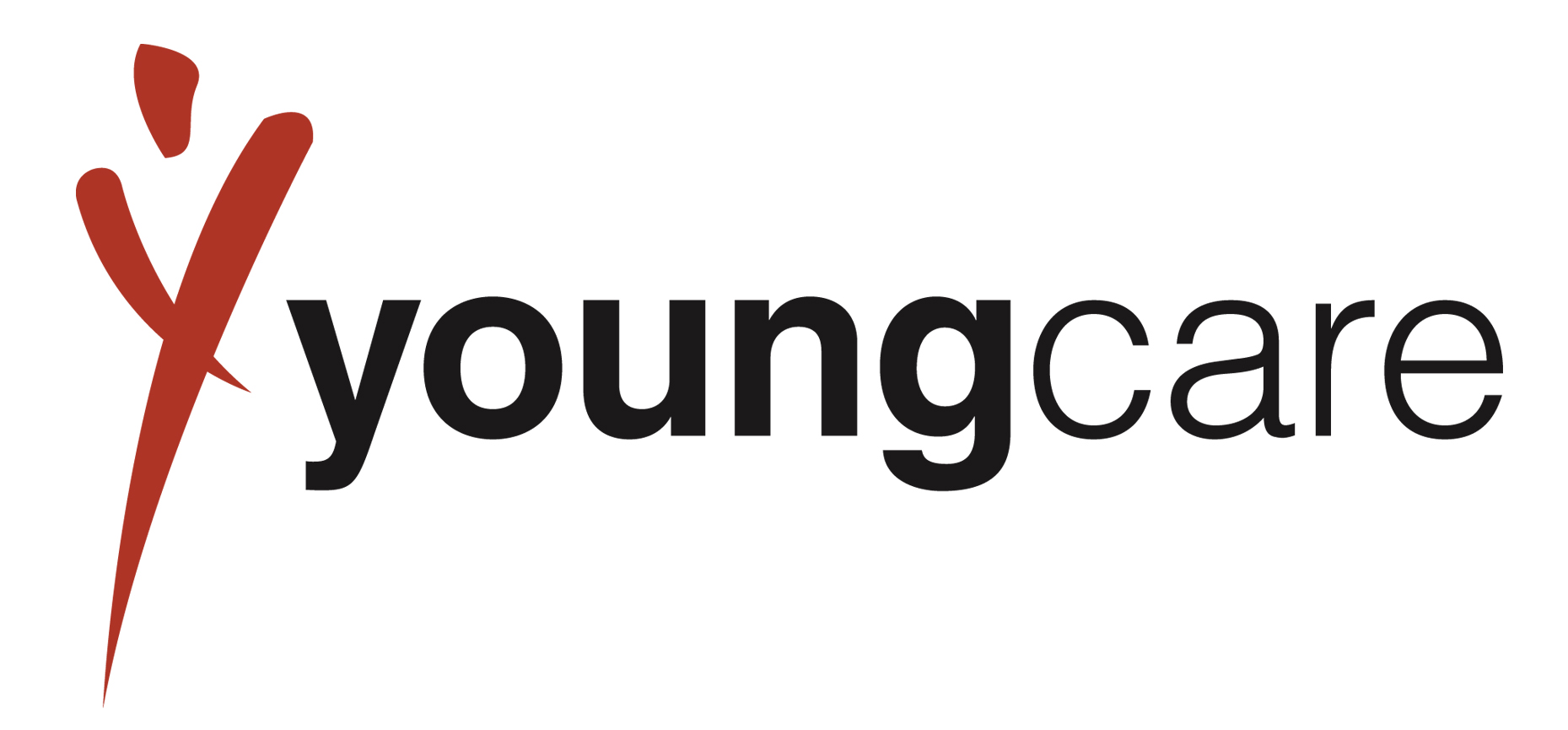
- Founded: 2005
- Founders: David Conry; Nick Bonifant; Matthew Lawson; Simon Lockyer
- Location: Australia
- Key people: Shevaune Conry
- Website: http://youngcare.com.au

Youngcare is an Australian non-for-profit organisation founded in 2005 to assist people between the ages of 16 and 65 with high physical support needs. Youngcare's programs and projects focus on supporting young people with a physical disability by providing greater choice in housing and care options. Currently, there are over 3,340 young people with high physical support needs living in residential aged care facilities. Common types of disability of those supported by Youngcare include cerebral palsy, multiple sclerosis or an acquired brain injury.

== History ==
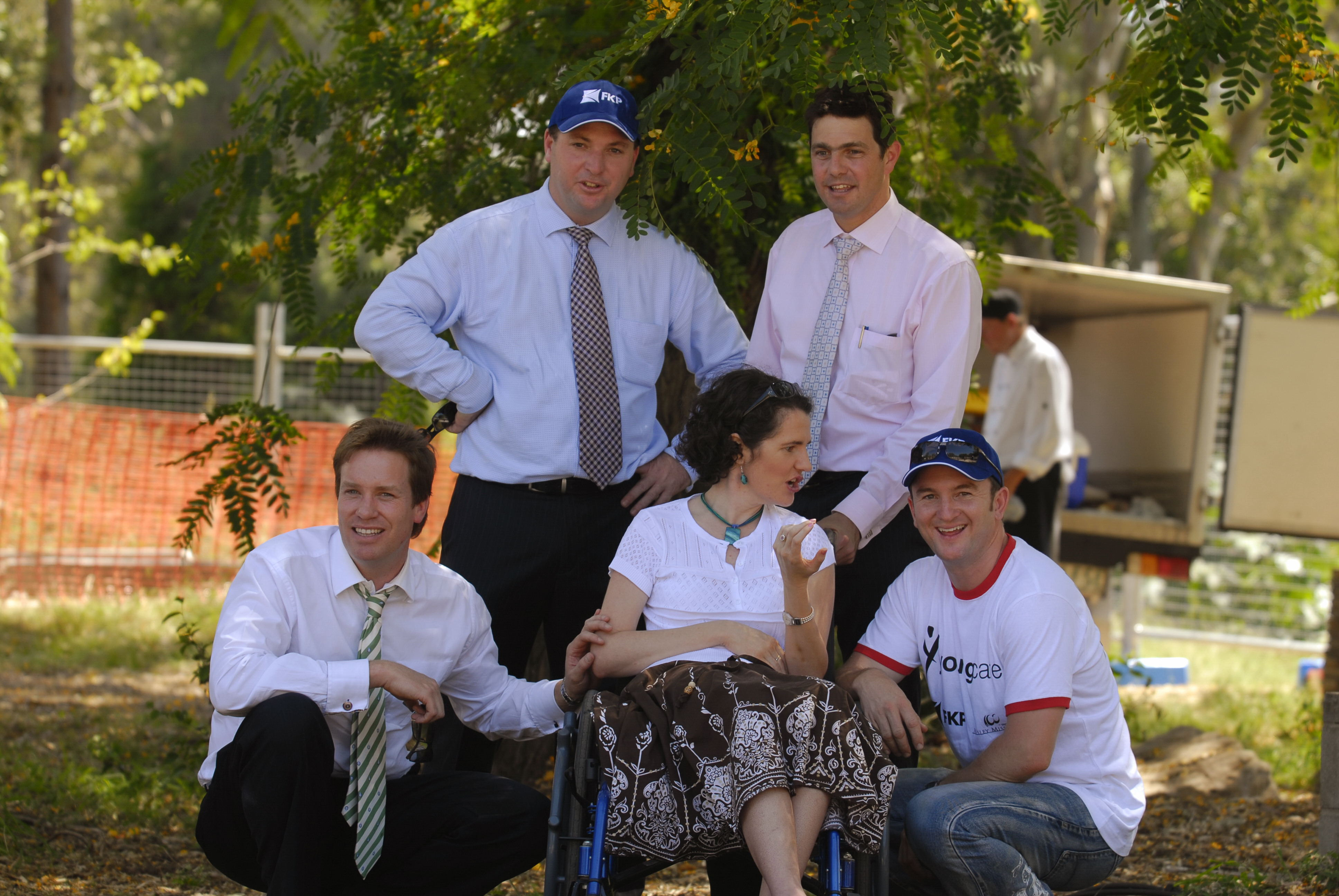
Youngcare inspiration Shevaune Conry and founders David Conry, Nick Bonifant, Matt Lawson and Simon Lockyer

Founded in 2005, Youngcare was born out of a young man's battle to find relevant and dignified care for his wife. Youngcare's inspiration, Shevaune Conry, was diagnosed with multiple sclerosis in 1998 aged 26. By age 33, her husband and Youngcare founder, David Conry, could no longer provide the specialized medical care at home that Shevaune needed on a 24-hour basis. After searching for an age-appropriate care provider, Shevaune was presented no alternative other than to move into aged care. It was this experience of the disability system that drove David, with co-founders Nick Bonifant, Matthew Lawson and Simon Lockyer, to create Youngcare and provide choice to young people who require full-time care. Shevaune died in August 2012 at age 40.

== Programs ==
=== Youngcare Housing ===
Youngcare housing supports young people's choice to live young lives in quality, Specialist Disability Accommodation (SDA). From investment and procurement, to design and development to final delivery and ongoing tenancy management, Youngcare offers premium residential options for young people with high physical support needs. Since the introduction of the National Disability Insurance Scheme (NDIS) and Specialist Disability Accommodation (SDA), Youngcare are able to provide more choice and control to people living with physical disabilities through various housing options nationally.

=== Youngcare Grants ===
At Home Care Grants

Youngcare's At Home Care Grants program began in 2009 and is critical in keeping young people at home with their families, and preventing new admissions to inappropriate housing. The grants provide one-off funding up to $10,000 for equipment, home modifications and essential support/respite that is unable to be funded through other means (e.g.. NDIS) and goes beyond items that are considered ‘reasonable and necessary’, instead focusing on increasing support and quality of life. Youngcare has facilitated over $8,000,000 of funding, with successful applications for items such as essential home modifications, equipment and in-home support.

Home Support Grants (HSG)

The Youngcare Home Support Grants provide essential funding that is critical for people to either remain living at home with some more help, or to return to the community from inappropriate housing such as aged care. Up to $20,000 is available in extreme situations for essential equipment, home modifications and services, household items and utilities to ensure an increase in the individuals quality of life. This grant aims to bridge the gap in essential services where there is clear evidence of need, or during the transitional period while individuals gain access to the NDIS.

=== Youngcare Connect ===
The Youngcare Connect Support Service supports families and individuals to navigate the often-complicated health, housing and disability systems. From providing expert NDIS and SDA advice, linking people with appropriate services to identifying funding or housing opportunities Youngcare Connect is run by a dedicated, compassionate and qualified team of friendly specialists, clinicians and outreach staff.

== Fundraising and events ==
Youngcare has been supported by a range of fundraising events, including live music concerts and music-industry speaker events, to raise funds and awareness for young Australians with high care needs.

In October 2025, Youngcare marked its twentieth anniversary with Living Loud: 20 Years of Youngcare at The Triffid in Brisbane, featuring an all-Australian line-up including The Veronicas, and hosted by Myf Warhurst.

Youngcare also runs Tales from the Road, an annual fundraising event in Brisbane where musicians and music-industry figures share touring stories in a hosted interview format. The 2024 event was held at The Fortitude Music Hall with members of notable acts such as Ball Park Music, The Wiggles and Powderfinger.

Youngcare has also been the beneficiary of concerts staged in support of the organisation, including a Youngcare Benefit Concert tenth-anniversary event in 2015, featuring Bernard Fanning and hosted by Julian Morrow of The Chaser.

Youngcare has also been supported by Battle of the Tech Bands, a charity live-music event series featuring bands formed by employees of technology companies.
