= Rod Cedaro =

Professional coach and triathlete

Personal information
- Born: Flemington Commission Housing, Melbourne, Victoria
- Spouse: Wade Olivieri

Sport
- Country: Australia
Medal record
Men's Triathlon
Ironman World Championship
Gold medal – first place	1990 NSW	Elite

Rod Cedaro is a professional coach and triathlete, primarily competing in long distance events.

== Athletic career ==
Rod Cedaro was champion at the Australian Ironman Triathlon in 1990 with a time of 08:58:20. In 1991 he placed 5th at the ITU Duathlon World Championships in Palm Springs USA which included a 10 km run, 60 km bike ride and then a 10 km run. Rod Cedaro won the Brisbane Marathon twice, in 1993 and 1994. He set the course record in 1993 with a time of 2:23:29. He was inducted into the Triathlon Hall of Fame as ACT Triathlete Of The Year 1991/1992.

== Coaching ==
Rod Cedaro gained a master's degree in Exercise Physiology and is now an Australian Coaching Council Accredited Level III Triathlon Coach. He specialises in altitude training at Altitude Services, working with athletes including boxers Randy Petalcorin and Susie Ramadan.

== Author ==
Rod Cedaro has also published several books on triathlon training including ‘Triathlon: Achieving Your Personal Best’, which was endorsed by the Triathlon Federation USA.

He has published many scientific peer reviewed publications pertaining to endurance sports performance and sports nutrition. He has contributed to the International Triathlon Science Conference and Australian Sports Commission regarding hypobaric oxygen techniques.

He is also a contributing editor of Triathlon & Multisport magazine.
