= Cassie Fien =

Australian long-distance runner

Cassie Fien (born 15 September 1985) is an Australian marathon runner.

== Running career ==
She was a three-time competitor at the IAAF World Half Marathon Championships.

She finished 12th at the 2015 New York City Marathon.

In 2016, Fien won the Oceania Half Marathon Championships after two previous runner-up finishes. The 2016 race was the half marathon featured along with the Gold Coast Marathon.

She finished 8th at the 2016 Berlin Marathon.

Fien is a two-time winner of Sydney's City2Surf.

She is also a three-time winner of the Bridge to Brisbane.

== 9-month ban after positive test for banned substance ==
On 7 February 2018, Cassie Fien accepted a nine-month ban and waived a hearing after testing positive for the banned substance Higenamine. Fien tested positive in an out-of-competition test in April 2017. The Australian Sports Anti-Doping Authority (ASADA) said Higenamine was increasingly being found in dietary supplements, though often listed under different names. Fien's ban, imposed by Athletics Australia, was backdated to 9 August 2017, and will conclude on 9 May. The ASADA said in a statement: "Ms. Fien’s sanction was reduced to nine months on the basis of her degree of fault and the fact that the supplement, ‘Liporush’, was a contaminated product."

== Military career ==
Fien is an enlisted training instructor with the RAAF.
