= Queensland Pride =

Australian LGBTQ magazine

- Categories: Gay and lesbian magazine
- Frequency: Monthly
- Publisher: Dean Bell and Mark Anthony
- Founded: 1991
- First issue: January 1991
- Country: Australia
- Based in: Brisbane
- Language: English
- OCLC: 37172176

Queensland Pride is a monthly gay and lesbian magazine based in Brisbane, Australia.

One of several titles published by Evo Media, Queensland Pride is distributed throughout Brisbane and major regional centres in Queensland. The publication covers local, national and international news of interest to the gay and lesbian community, and has a strong focus on community news, arts and entertainment.

Queensland Pride was first published as a monthly in January 1991, one month after the state of Queensland decriminalised male homosexuality. It was originally published as a newspaper, in a black-and-white newsprint format. It was the state's first gay and lesbian publication. Its founding editor was Raymond 'Wally' Cowin, who remained in the editorial role until February 2001. He was succeeded as editor by the then news editor Iain Clacher, who remained editor of the title until January 2009 when he died of a heart attack. Clacher was succeeded as editor by Peter Hackney. Scott McGuinness and Andrew Blythe also served in the role, before Andrew Shaw took over from June 2012 - April 2017. Shaw was previously editor of Melbourne LGBTI magazine MCV (Melbourne Community Voice) from 2000 to 2003 and 2009 to 2012.

In March 2001, Queensland Pride began publishing fortnightly. It reverted to a monthly publication schedule in March 2004, shortly after publication of the title was taken over by a new company, Special Publications Australia. Special Publications Australia sold the title to Sydney-based Evolution Publishing in June 2007. From June 2007 the publication changed from a newsprint format to a high-quality, full-colour, full-gloss format. On 9 November 2012, under Evolution Publishing, fortnightly publication began and continued when the title was licensed to Evo Media in May 2013. In June 2015, following a major redesign, QP returned to a monthly publication schedule.

== Controversy ==
In 2013, Queensland Pride became and remains under investigated by the Office of Fair Trading in Queensland for claiming in media kits that it was distributing 15,740 copies per issue at the end of 2012 when only 4,970 copies were going out, having the effect of misleading advertisers and the GLBTI community that were exposed to Queensland Pride's claims.

Liquidators for Evolution Publishing Pty Limited claim Dean Bell, Evo Media's Managing Director was a "shadow director" and referred questions of phoenixing to ASIC.

== See also ==
- Brisbane Pride Festival
- Q News
