= Beirne =

Beirne is surname, which may refer to:

== People ==
=== Surname ===
- Alannah Beirne (born 1993), Irish fashion model and reality TV personality
- Andrew Beirne (1771–1845), Irish-born politician and merchant in Virginia, U.S.
- Brian Beirne (born 1946), American radio disc jockey
- Bryan Patrick Beirne (1918–1998), Irish entomologist who emigrated to Canada
- Charles Beirne, S.J. (1938–2010), American Jesuit and academic administrator
- Dan Beirne (born 1982), Canadian actor
- Dearbháile Beirne (born 1998), Irish dual code footballer
- Gerard Beirne (born 1962), Irish author
- Jim Beirne (1946–2021), American football player
- John Beirne (1893–1967), Irish politician
- Joseph A. Beirne (1911–1974), American labour union leader
- Katie Beirne Fallon, American political advisor
- Keith Beirne (born 1997), Irish player of Gaelic football
- Kevin Beirne (born 1974), American baseball pitcher
- Logan Beirne, American entrepreneur, writer, and academic
- Luke Francis Beirne (born 1995), Irish-born Canadian writer
- Oliver Beirne (1811–1888), landowner in western Virginia, U.S.
- Paul Beirne (born 1966), Canadian sports executive
- Tadhg Beirne (born 1992), Irish rugby union player
- Thomas Beirne (businessman) KSG (1860–1949), Irish-born businessman, politician and philanthropist in Australia
- Thomas Beirne (writer) (fl. c. 1900), Irish language writer and activist
- Walter Beirne (1907–1959), Irish trade union leader

=== Given name ===
- Beirne Lay Jr. (1909–1982), American writer and combat veteran of World War II

== Places ==
- Beirne, Arkansas, an unincorporated community in southern Clark County, Arkansas, United States

== Other uses ==
- Beirne Stadium, a multi-use sports stadium in Smithfield, Rhode Island, U.S.
- Byrnside-Beirne-Johnson House, a historic home near Union, Monroe County, West Virginia, U.S.
- TC Beirne School of Law, at the University of Queensland, Australia
- TC Beirne Department Store, in Queensland, Australia

== See also ==
- Bierne, a commune in France
- O'Beirne (disambiguation)
