= McWhirters =

McWhirters Marketplace
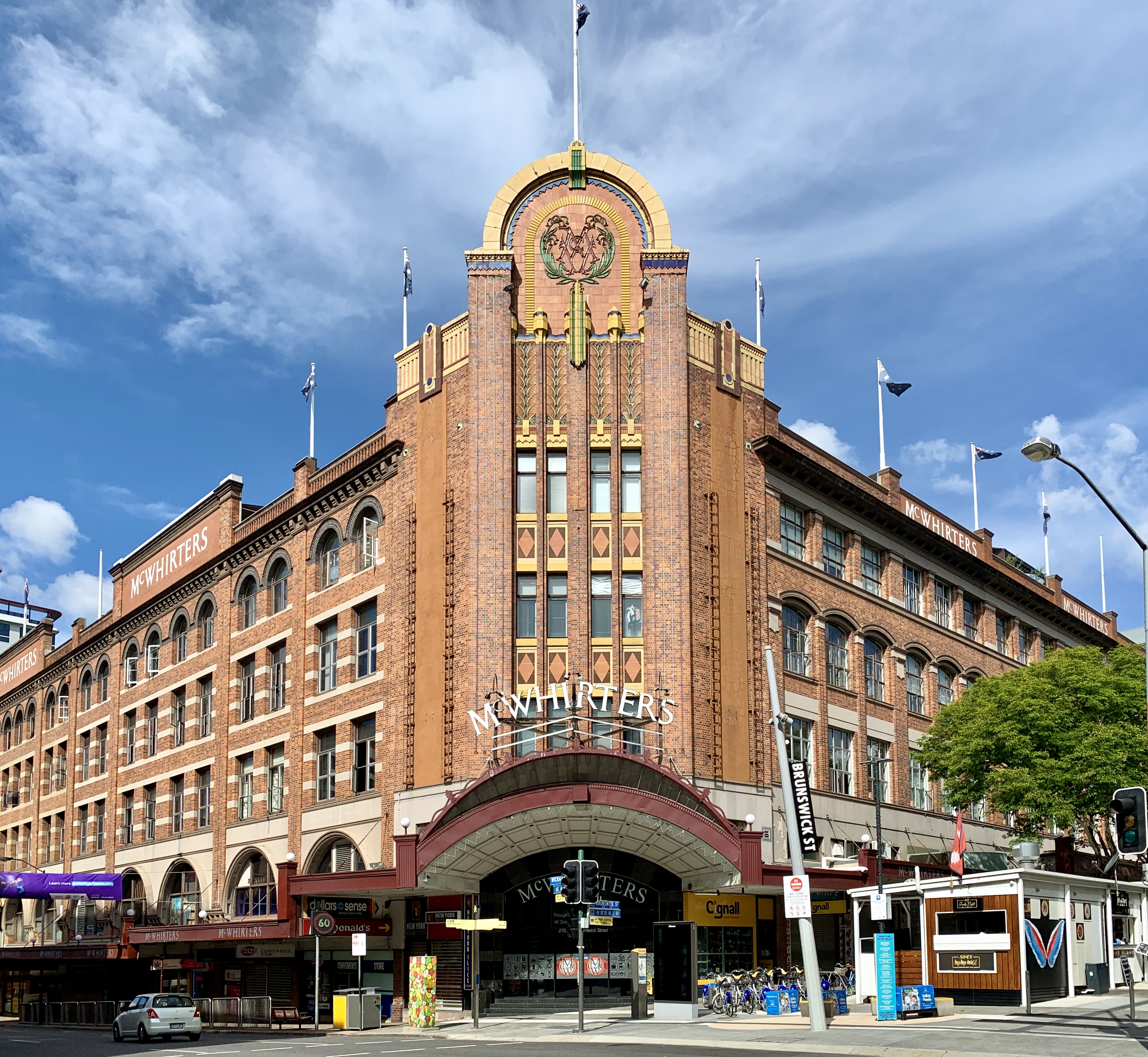
- Wickham Street entrance in 2020

- Location in metropolitan Brisbane
- 27.4574°S 153.0344°E
- Location: Wickham Street, Fortitude Valley, Queensland, Australia

Queensland Heritage Register
- Official name: McWhirters Marketplace, McWhirters, McWhirters & Son Ltd, Myer
- Type: state heritage (built)
- Designated: 21 October 1992
- Reference no.: 600214
- Significant period: 1902–1931 (fabric); 1902–1955 (historical, McWirters)

McWhirters is a heritage-listed former department store at Wickham Street, Fortitude Valley, Queensland, Australia. It is also known as McWhirters Marketplace, McWhirters & Son Ltd, and Myer (Fortitude Valley).

It has been redeveloped as a shopping centre and apartment building. The buildings occupy over an acre of land bound by Brunswick, Wickham and Warner streets.

== History ==
The McWhirters department store, comprising four adjoining brick buildings of from three to five storeys in height, was erected in four stages on land acquired between 1899 and 1929, by Brisbane draper James McWhirter and the firm of McWhirter & Son Ltd (later McWhirters Ltd).

On arrival in Australia in 1878 from Ayrshire, Scotland, James McWhirter worked for merchants DL Brown & Co. before entering into partnership with Mr Duncan Sinclair in a South Brisbane drapery business, c. 1883. After a few years the partnership was dissolved, and McWhirter returned to Brown & Co. before joining Thomas Charles Beirne in his Fortitude Valley drapery business c. 1894, firstly as manager, then in partnership for about 3 years. McWhirter sold out to Beirne in 1898, and in the same year purchased Michael Pigott's drapery business, located in leased premises across the road at 292 Brunswick Street. Pigott had been TC Beirne's employer in Ireland, and his former partner in South Brisbane, but moved from Fortitude Valley in 1898 to concentrate on his Toowoomba business established in 1896 (which later relocated into his new purpose-built Pigott's Building). When McWhirter took over Pigott's Brunswick Street business, the new firm of McWhirter and Son, drapers, was established, opening in September 1898 with a staff of 30.

James McWhirter was an experienced manager and astute businessman who established his drapery business just as the Queensland economy was recovering from the severe economic depression of the 1890s. Despite the slowing of the economy engendered by the widespread drought of 1900–1902, McWhirter was in a position to capitalise on Queensland's economic boom of the early 20th century, and within three decades the firm he established in 1898 had expanded from a small drapery business to one of Brisbane's largest and most sophisticated department stores, with a principal store occupying over an acre of land bounded by Brunswick, Wickham and Warner Streets, Fortitude Valley, at the well-known Valley Corner.

In the early years of the 20th century, Fortitude Valley, centred around the intersection of Wickham and Brunswick streets (the Valley Corner), became one of the most important shopping centres in Brisbane. This is explained partly by the ready availability of efficient public transport – train from the late 1880s and electric tram from the late 1890s; partly by a rising population in the surrounding suburbs of New Farm, Bowen Hills and Newstead; but most importantly by the healthy spirit of competition between the Valley's principal retail stores – TC Beirne Department Store, McWhirters, Overells and later the ACB Company and Waltons as well – which attracted customers from all over Brisbane.

From its establishment in 1898, McWhirter & Son expanded rapidly. In 1899 McWhirter purchased the allotments at the northeast corner of the busy intersection of Wickham and Brunswick Streets, although these were not occupied by McWhirters for another three decades. In 1902 the firm also acquired land at 48 Warner Street, at the rear of their Brunswick Street shop, and extended the Brunswick Street building the depth of the block between Brunswick and Warner Streets. In 1905 they secured an adjoining allotment in Warner Street, on which they erected another warehouse, which appears to be an extension of the c. 1902 building. In 1905 the firm was registered as a private company, McWhirter & Son Ltd, and by 1907 was listed at 292–298 Brunswick Street, having expanded into several adjacent shops east of the original building. By 1909 the firm employed 270 staff, had established a London office, directly imported many lines, and had developed an extensive mail-order department servicing all parts of rural Queensland, as well as clients in New South Wales, South Australia and British New Guinea. The firm pioneered the free carriage of mail-orders, and attracted a wide custom. The majority of their clientele were women, so besides drapery and a particularly fine millinery department, the firm stocked medicines, perfumes, silks, and home furnishings. The facade of the Brunswick Street building had been remodelled by 1909 with the first arcade front in Brisbane, and the firm's colourful window displays were a great attraction.

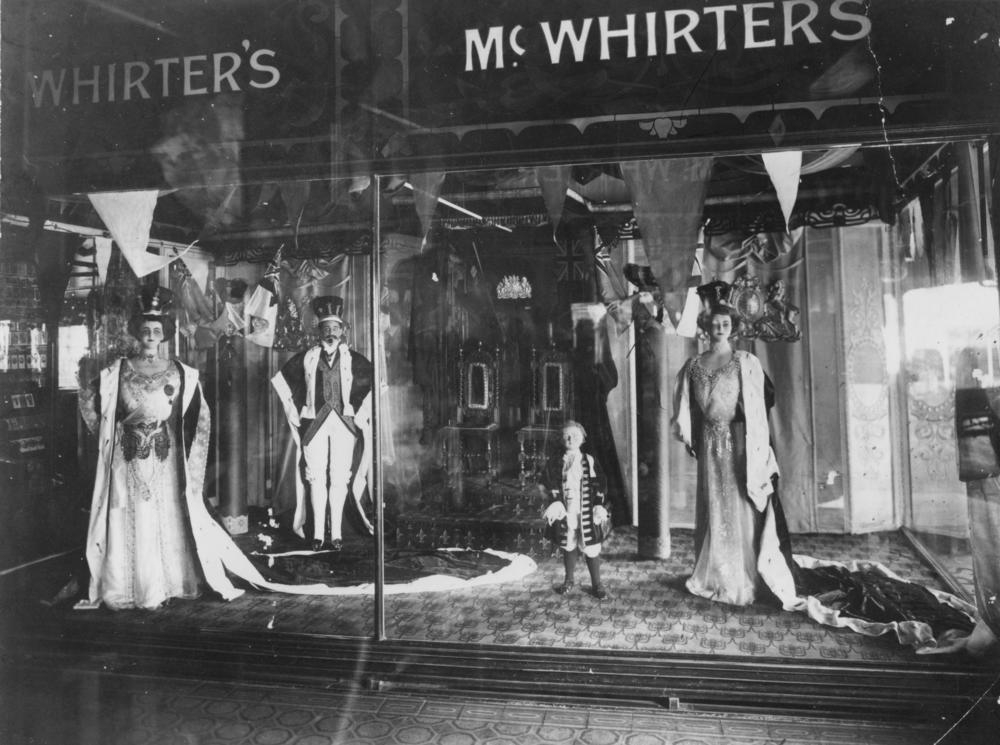
Window display in McWhirters to celebrate King George V's ascension to the throne, 1910

In 1910 McWhirter acquired title to four more allotments in Warner Street, and between 1910 and 1914 to the two allotments in Brunswick Street occupied by his first store and adjacent premises to the west. The Warner Street land was situated between McWhirter's existing 48 Warner Street warehouse and Wickham Street, with long frontages to both streets. Reportedly purchased for £8,000, McWhirter intended to erect on this site, thoroughly modern and well-equipped buildings, such as will meet the requirements of the ever-increasing trade.

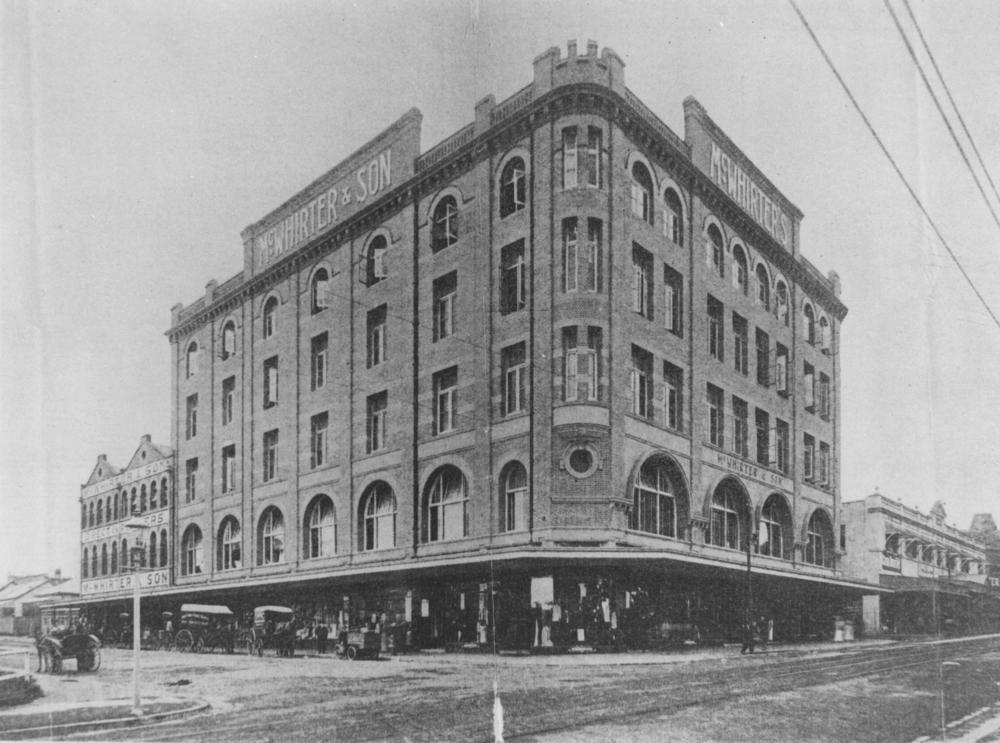
McWhirters department store, 1913

McWhirter commissioned Brisbane architects Atkinson & McLay to design a substantial, five-storeyed building for this corner, and when completed in 1912, the new building became an immediate Valley landmark, seen for miles around, and dominated the Valley Corner area. Described as a vast emporium on its opening in October 1912 – and subsequently marketed as such by McWhirter – the store was well-appointed in fine materials. Every effort had been made to design the most modern and progressive of department stores, with new devices for the comfort, convenience and prompt attention to customers. On the ground level the extensive street frontages had the latest in island windows with narrow copper mouldings. There were five street entrances, and mosaic tiling and leadlights in the main vestibule. The interior was well-ventilated and well-lighted; fittings were of silky oak throughout; and the ceilings were lined with Wunderlich pressed metal. A sprinkler system was installed for fire prevention, there were three electric elevators for the convenience of customers, and the pneumatic cash tube system was the largest in the state. In an innovative move, hundreds of silky oak display tables permitted customers to browse and inspect goods without being dependent on sales assistants. Other goods were displayed in glass cabinets under glass counters, and there were sliding glass doors to the shelves behind the counters.

The grand new store housed over 50 departments. Manchester, fabric, haberdashery, jewellery, travel goods, etc. were located on the ground floor. The first floor, which housed the millinery and women's clothing departments (including a corset boudoir), was particularly well-appointed. It contained a large circular display room with carpet on the floor, mirrors everywhere, and showcases so arranged as to form little retreats or parlours. On the second floor were furniture, carpets, linoleum, and on the third were crockery, glassware, kitchenware, toys, and for the convenience of customers, a tearoom overlooking the Brisbane River and suburbs. On the top floor were the dressmaking and tailoring workrooms, equipped with revolving pedestals for fittings.

Clearly, McWhirters had identified their principal clientele as female, and dedicated the new building to this market. The men's clothing department had been relegated to the Brunswick Street store, although it did take up most of this building. A new boot department was opened, serving both male and female customers, but this was not located in the 1912 building.

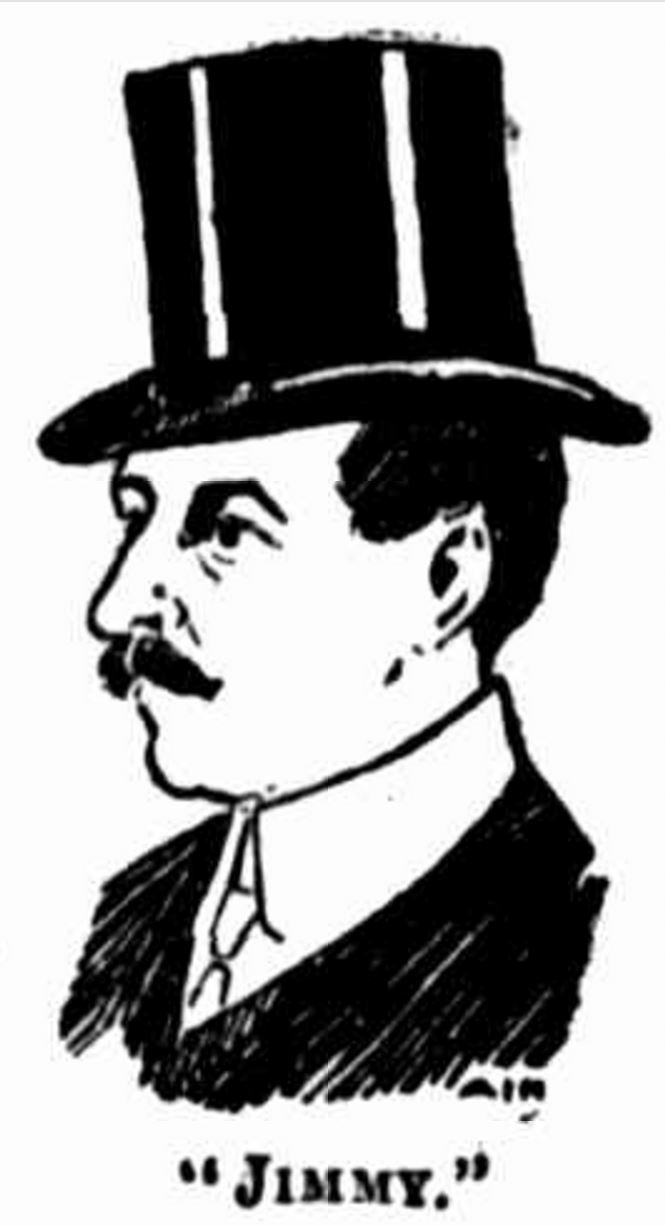
James (Jimmy) McWhirter junior, 1906

McWhirter's 1912 store was one of the first of the big Brisbane department stores – rivals included TC Beirne and Overells in Fortitude Valley, McDonnell & East near Roma Street railway station, and Finneys, Isles & Co and Allan & Stark in Queen Street – to reflect international trends in modern department store retailing. Between 1860 and 1920, the industrialised world's level of affluence and leisure time increased significantly, and the "art of shopping", once the prerogative of the wives of the wealthy, was adopted eagerly by the wives of the emerging middle classes. By the mid-19th century department stores were evolving worldwide to accommodate the rising numbers of middle class shoppers. The earliest of the grand department stores was Aristide Boucicault's Bon Marche, which opened in Paris in 1852, followed by Macy's in New York City in 1860. These provided important models, but in Australia the department store was also the logical extension of the general store or drapery.

To complement the refined department store environment, customers (predominantly female) experienced a superior quality of service, the object of which was to make them feel special and confident. Often this entailed an attitude of deference, but more commonly in Australia this developed into cheerful, polite efficiency and promises of honesty and fair dealing. Whichever method was employed, the aim was the same – to encourage spending.

McWhirter and Son Ltd were at the cutting edge of department store culture in Brisbane, prospering through the 1910s despite the slowing of the Queensland economy during the First World War. About 1918 a substantial, 4-storeyed brick bulk store was erected in Warner Street opposite McWhirters' c. 1902-1905 warehouse. One floor of this contained a staff dining hall/meeting room. By 1921 McWhirter's Motor Garage was operating on the north side of Ballow Street in Fortitude Valley, to house and service the firm's fleet of delivery vehicles.

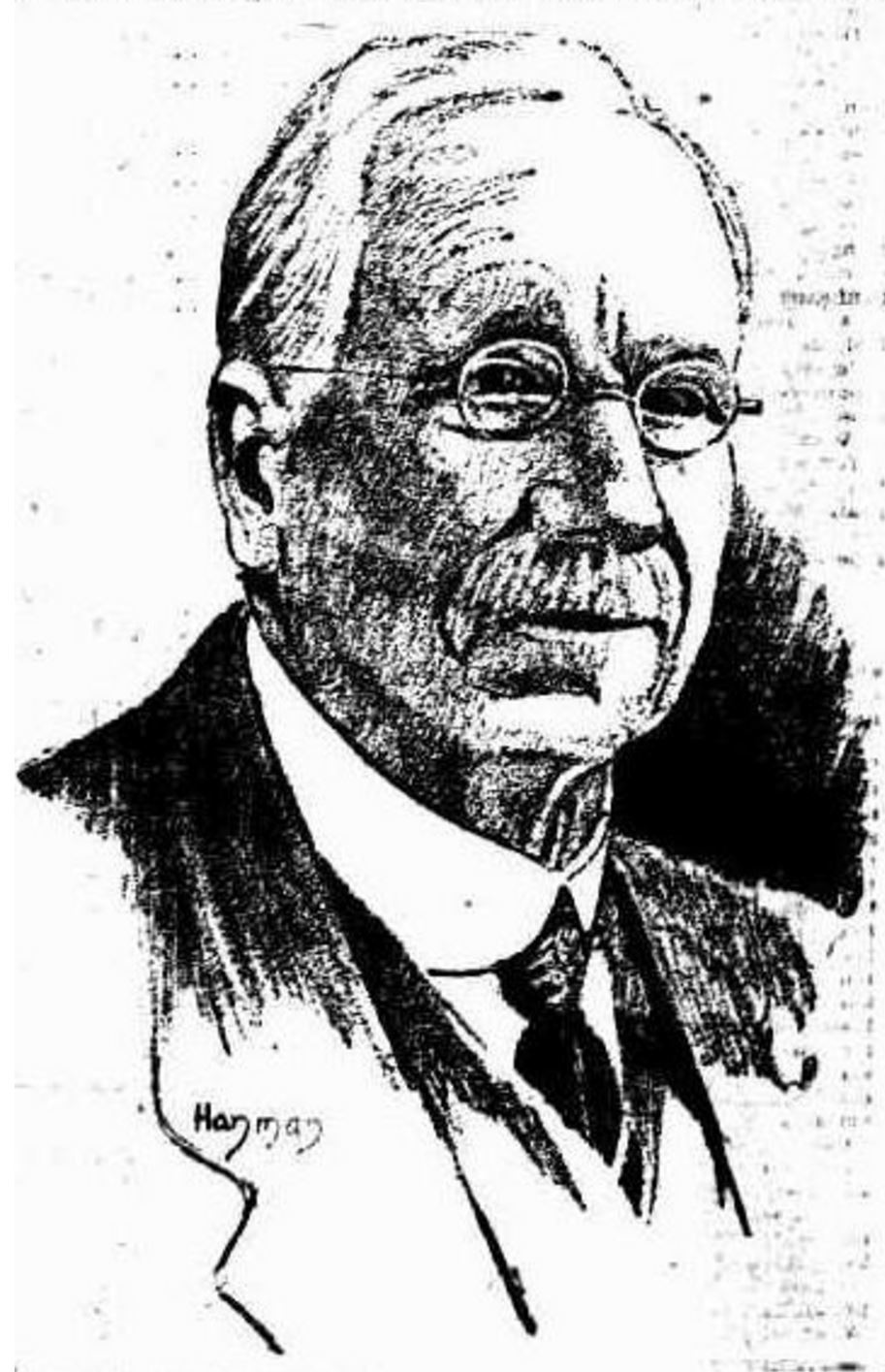
James McWhirter, 1923

After the First World War, James McWhirter (senior) decided to visit Britain leaving in March 1919, leaving his son James (Jimmy) McWhirter junior in charge of the business. However, Jimmy McWhirter took a business trip to Melbourne in September 1919 and, while passing through Sydney, he contracted influenza which developed into double pneumonia and he died on 17 September 1919 at the Lister Private Hospital. James McWhirter (senior) returned to Brisbane in December 1919. In 1920 the firm was floated as a public company, McWhirters Ltd, with James McWhirter senior as managing director. Further expansion took place with the acquisition in 1921 of the Brunswick Street allotments between McWhirter's existing store and the allotments he had purchased in 1899 at the corner of Wickham and Brunswick Streets. With the exception of a lane off Wickham Street, McWhirter now owned all the allotments between Brunswick and Warner Streets, from Wickham Street east to, and including, his first Brunswick Street store – an area of nearly an acre in the centre of the most popular shopping district in Brisbane. Building commenced in 1922–1923 with the construction of a new four-storeyed store replacing McWhirter's original store in Brunswick Street. The building impressed with the wide span between columns, excellent lighting and ventilation, and fast elevators.

James McWhirter died in England in 1925, but the firm of McWhirters Ltd continued to grow, paralleling the development of Fortitude Valley as a thriving commercial centre, with its three competing anchor stores of TC Beirne, Overells and McWhirters. By the 1930s, McWhirters had also branched into shirt manufacture, with their own clothing factory in the Valley. The mail order department had remained an important and lucrative aspect of the business, and McWhirters also offered credit and lay-by systems. Part of the success of McWhirters, like other early 20th century department stores in Brisbane, lay also in the value placed by management on employees. By 1931, some of the nearly 800 McWhirter employees had been with the firm over 3 decades, and staff had their own benefit society.

In 1929 the company secured title to the lane off Wickham Street beside their 1912 store, and in 1930–31, just as Australia was being caught up in a severe, worldwide economic depression, McWhirters Ltd constructed a four and five-storeyed brick building on the corner of Brunswick and Wickham Streets, linking the facades of their 1912 and 1923 buildings. The steel framed building with reinforced concrete walls and facework in brick and terracotta, was designed by the Brisbane architectural firm of TR Hall and LB Phillips (who also designed the Brisbane City Hall, Shell House, and the Tattersalls Club Members Dining Room). It featured a principal truncated corner, richly decorated in the Art Deco style, which became a landmark advertisement for the store on the busy Valley Corner. The builder was George Alexander Stronach of Brisbane, who tendered with a price of £112,000; the 800 long tons (810 t) of structural steel was manufactured and erected by local firm Evans, Deakin, & Co. Ltd; and Wunderlich supplied the terracotta tiles used on the truncated corner as well as pressed metal and fibrous cement ceilings. McWhirters department store now had a floor space of 6.5 acres (2.6 ha).

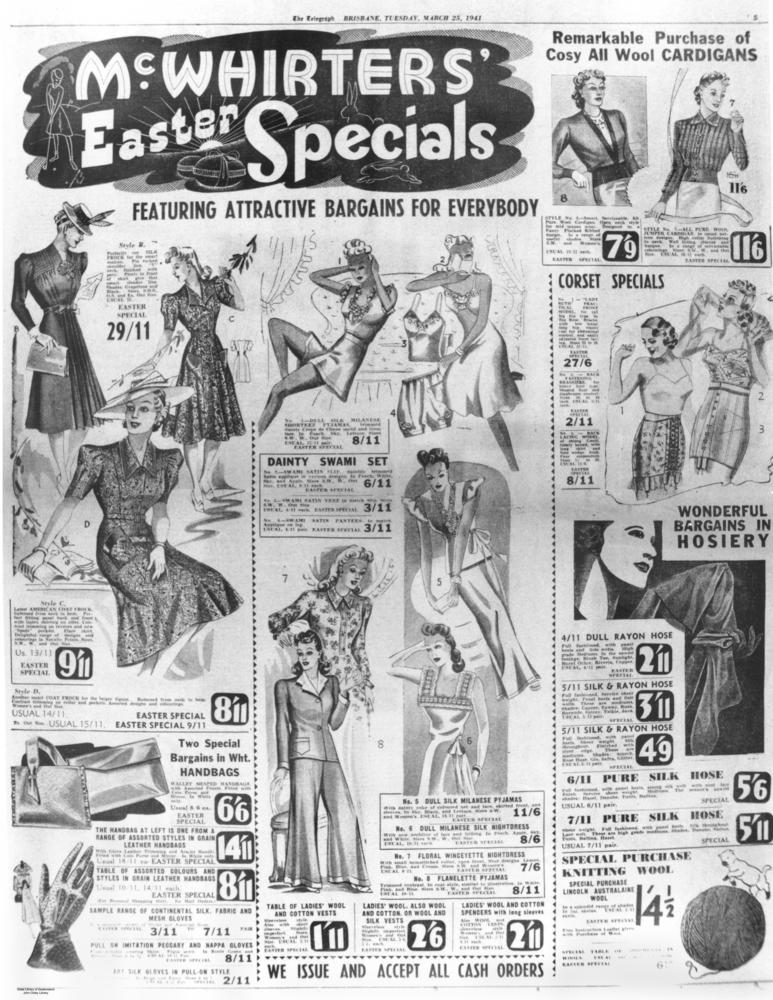
Advertisement for women's fashion at McWhirters, 1941

The exterior facades of the 1930–1931 building were designed to replicate those of the 1912 and 1923 buildings, but internally the building reflected new trends in department store presentation. There were no partitions, each floor measuring about 300 by 200 feet (91 by 61 m), with supporting concrete pillars masked by stained wood cabinets. Large twin-elevators were installed and the pneumatic tube system was extended. On the ground level three separate "lock-up" shops fronted Brunswick Street, for businesses which traded after normal (5.30pm closing) store hours.

In 1955 the Myer took over the McWhirters company and eventually renamed the store Myer, operating until 1988 by which time both its rival department stores, TC Beirne (now David Jones) and Waltons, had already closed down. Myer then concentrated its inner-city business in its Queen Street store (the former Allan & Stark Building) in the Brisbane central business district. Fortitude Valley had become much less desirable as a shopping district, due to the declining reputation and quality of the suburb that had begun as far back as the 1970s. Other factors were an increasing dependency on the motor car, and strong competition from suburban shopping centres such as Westfield Chermside.

In 1989 the property was redeveloped as McWhirters Marketplace, entailing extensive internal refurbishment.

In 1997, it was altered to include apartments on the upper levels.

== Description ==
McWhirters is centrally located in Fortitude Valley on a site bound by Wickham, Warner and Brunswick Streets. It comprises four adjoining buildings which form a large brick three, four and five-storeyed complex.

The building fronting Warner Street (c. 1902-05, is a three-storeyed pale brick building with a parapeted facade, with two gabled ends facing the street. The facade has arched windows with beige brick voussoirs, keystones, and trim to round windows in the centre of the gables. Internally, the building has an unusual exposed timber roof structure made of trusses spanning double beams on timber columns with triangular brackets. The timber boarded ceiling is partially raked, and has pressed metal rosettes.

The five-storeyed 1912 brick building occupies the corner of Brunswick and Wickham Streets. Its facade has continuous piers and arched openings to the first and fourth floors, and is trimmed with rendered concrete sills, lintels and insets. The parapet has a substantial cornice with dentils, and raised portions bearing the name "McWhirters". The Wickham and Warner Streets corner is rounded, and has a castellated parapet and a round window at first floor level. Internally, this 1912 section retains some of its pressed metal ceilings with floral motifs and some column capitals with plaster scrolls, and has an encased steel structure.

The four-storeyed 1923 brick building faces Brunswick Street. The facade is similar to the 1912 building facades in materials, with some variation in detailing. The facade has a continuous arched brick spandrel above the third level windows, and a substantial parapet which also bears the McWhirters name. It has a concrete internal structure.

The 1930–1931 building facing Brunswick and Wickham Streets is four and five storeys, and matches, with identical detailing, the facades of the 1912 and 1923 sections. The facades are linked with a richly detailed truncated corner with polychrome glazed terracotta tiles integrated with the brickwork. This corner has two continuous brick piers crowned with an arched tiled panel rising above the parapet line, which bears the McWhirter's monogram "McW" in a Lily of the Valley motif. The windows are spaced with tiled panels in diamond patterns. The corner contains the principal entrance to the building, which is covered by a curved awning with decorative glass insets.

The corner entrance doors are set in arched polished black stone surrounds. The entrance foyer is a double-storeyed height space which is finely decorated with white marble panels set in black marble grids, and decorative plasterwork based on diamond and star patterns. Internally, this 1930–1931 section has a concrete-encased steel structure.

The entire building is encircled with a stepped metal awning, which has a sheeted soffit on Brunswick Street and a pressed metal soffit with floral motifs on Wickham and Warner Streets. Two sets of timber and etched glass entrance doors have been incorporated into the refurbishment in the 1912 section.

The exterior form and detailing of McWhirters remains largely intact, although the ground floor brickwork and openings are mostly new. The building retains its prominence, contributing to the early 20th century commercial character and streetscape of centre Fortitude Valley. Its distinctive corner assumes landmark status. Some fine remnants of the early 20th century department store interiors are visible, including the roof structure of the c. 1902-1905 building, remains of pressed metal ceilings and column decorations in the 1912 building, and decoration to the entrance hall of the 1930–1931 building.

== Heritage listing ==
McWhirters Marketplace was listed on the Queensland Heritage Register on 21 October 1992 having satisfied the following criteria.

The place is important in demonstrating the evolution or pattern of Queensland's history.

The growth of the McWhirters complex is important in demonstrating the pattern and evolution of Queensland's history, reflecting the late 19th/early 20th century development of Fortitude Valley as a major commercial and shopping centre, which was sustained well into the post-Second World War period. Historically, McWhirters is also significant in providing evidence of the development and nature of early 20th century department stores in Queensland, and of the shopping culture engendered by them.

The place demonstrates rare, uncommon or endangered aspects of Queensland's cultural heritage.

The 1930–31 building has a finely detailed landmark Art Deco corner demonstrating a rare aspect of Queensland's cultural heritage.

The place is important in demonstrating the principal characteristics of a particular class of cultural places.

McWhirters is important in demonstrating the principal characteristics of a substantial early 20th century department store built in stages, and which employs elements of the facade as advertising and contains remnants of earlier department store decorative detailing in the c. 1902-05, 1912 and 1930–31 sections.

The place is important because of its aesthetic significance.

McWhirters is of aesthetic value: it is a prominent building which makes a strong contribution to the commercial character and streetscape of centre Fortitude Valley; the fine interwar Art Deco corner is a Brisbane landmark; and the corner entrance foyer contains fine decorative detailing.

The place has a strong or special association with a particular community or cultural group for social, cultural or spiritual reasons.

McWhirters at the Valley Corner has a special association for Queenslanders, having symbolised "The Valley" to several generations of local residents and visitors alike.

The place has a special association with the life or work of a particular person, group or organisation of importance in Queensland's history.

The place has a special association with the life and work of James McWhirter and the firm of McWhirter & Son Ltd (later McWhirters Ltd), and with the work of architects Atkinson & McLay and Hall & Phillips. McWhirters also has a special association with the Wunderlich company, the 1930–31 corner facade being a major example of their work in Queensland.
