= Bulolo Flats =

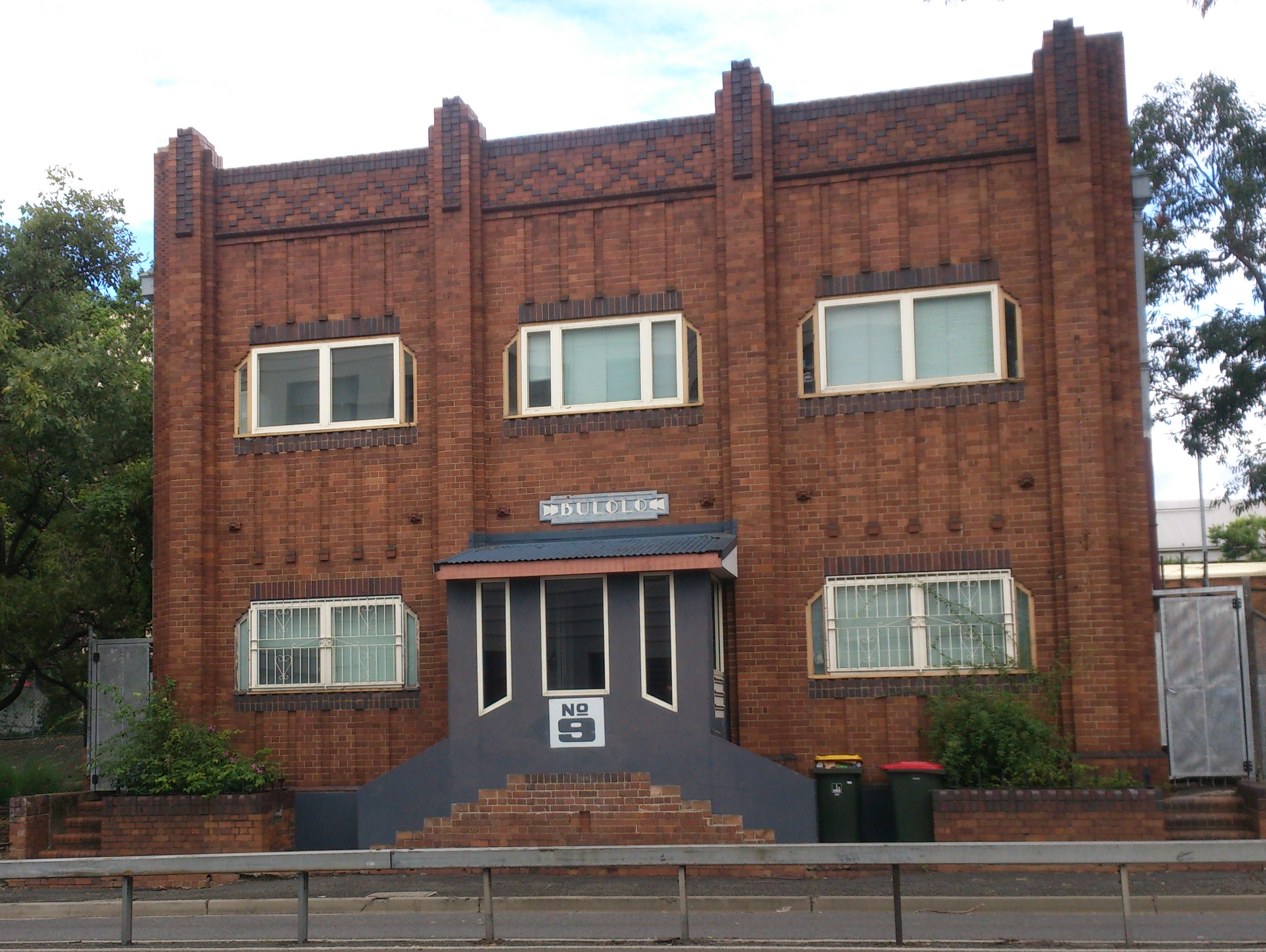

- Location within Queensland Location within Australia
- 27.4594°S 153.0357°E
- Location: 9 McLachlan Street, Fortitude Valley, City of Brisbane, Queensland, Australia

History
- Design period: 1919–1930s (interwar period)
- Built: 1934

Site notes
- Architect: Hennessey, Hennessey & Co
- Architectural style: Romanesque

Queensland Heritage Register
- Official name: Bulolo Flats
- Type: state heritage (built)
- Designated: 13 November 2008
- Reference no.: 602188
- Significant period: 1934–present
- Builders: P H Turner & Co

Bulolo Flats is a heritage-listed apartment block at 9 McLachlan Street, Fortitude Valley, City of Brisbane, Queensland, Australia. It was designed by Hennessey, Hennessey & Co and built in 1934 by P H Turner & Co. It was added to the Queensland Heritage Register on 13 November 2008.

== History ==
Bulolo Flats, a two-storeyed block of eight self-contained brick flats, was erected in 1934 for Brisbane businessman and politician Thomas Charles Beirne as purpose-designed residential flats for young women working in his TC Beirne Department Store in Fortitude Valley. The building was designed by the prominent architectural firm of Hennessy, Hennessy and Co. of Sydney, Melbourne and Brisbane.

Thomas Charles Beirne (1860–1949) had a strong association with the development of retailing in Queensland and with the expansion of Fortitude Valley as a major Brisbane retail centre. Like his contemporaries Michael Daniel Piggott, James McWhirter and Frank McDonnell, Beirne founded a fortune based on the burgeoning retail trade and the transformation of nineteenth-century drapery stores into large twentieth-century department stores.

After having trained as a draper in Ireland Beirne had emigrated to Victoria in 1884, where he was employed in a Melbourne drapery store. In 1886, he joined fellow Irishman MD Piggott in partnership in a small retail drapery in South Brisbane. A disastrous fire in the store in 1889 and the dissolution of the partnership in August 1891 resulted in Beirne establishing his own store in Fortitude Valley, which was emerging as a retail centre to rival North and South Brisbane. His business expanded over the succeeding decades to become one of Queensland's leading department stores, with branch stores established at Ipswich (1892) and Mackay (1902). In 1894 James McWhirter was employed as Beirne's manager for one year, became his partner for another three years, then opened his own establishment on the other side of Brunswick Street in Fortitude Valley, in competition to Beirne. The strong rivalry between the Beirne and McWhirter drapery shops and their evolution into large department stores was one of the principal factors in establishing Fortitude Valley as an important retail centre, dominated for the first half of the twentieth century by the two "big" stores.

From 1898 Beirne was an active member of the Brisbane Traders' Association. He was a supporter of the Labor Party from its infancy, but would not be tied to Party policy. In 1905 he was appointed to the Queensland Legislative Council, remaining a member until the Council was abolished in 1922. He was a successful business person and sat on a number of company boards, including those of the Brisbane Tramway Company, the Queensland Board of the Australian Mutual Provident Society, Queensland Trustees, the Atlas Assurance Co., and the British Australian Cotton Association. In 1927 he was elected to the Council of the University of Queensland and served as warden of the University from 1928 to 1941. In 1935 he donated £20,000 to the University to establish the TC Beirne School of Law.

A devout Roman Catholic and close friend and confidant of Archbishop James Duhig (1871–1965), Beirne was a prominent benefactor of the church. In July 1929 he was awarded a papal knighthood of the Order of St Gregory the Great in recognition of his work for the Church, especially in connection with Duhig's planned Holy Name Cathedral in Fortitude Valley. On his death in 1949 The Courier-Mail commented that "Brisbane has lost a personality whose life has been woven strongly into its own progress and development for half a century".

Beirne was regarded as a good employer and in erecting Bulolo Flats he appears to have had the welfare of his female employees at heart, the flats being intended for the use of girls who came from the country to work at his Fortitude Valley department store. Many of Beirne's young female employees were experiencing city life for the first time, and he took a paternal interest in their moral welfare. Located in McLachlan Street close to Brunswick Street, Bulolo was conveniently situated within easy walking distance of the main Fortitude Valley shopping centre and the TC Beirne emporium. The building accommodated eight flats, each comprising a large bed-sitting room with adjoining sleep-out balcony, a kitchenette with built-in cupboards, and tiled bathroom with built-in bath, hot water geyser and built-in cupboards. Each flat had both a private entrance and a service entrance with a trades hatch to receive deliveries (such as milk, bread, meat and vegetables). Shared laundry facilities were provided on the rooftop. The flats offered girls the privacy of a home of their own, as an alternative to shared accommodation in hostels, boarding houses, guest houses, private hotels and tenement or apartment buildings.

The construction of Bulolo Flats was an indication of changing social attitudes toward the role of women in the workplace and of community expectations about the behaviour of women in society. Designed as private homes for young women earning their own income, they were symbolic of contemporary community recognition that many young, unmarried women of this era could support themselves financially and were no longer content to live in the family home, or in supervised accommodation such as hostels, or in other forms of communal dwellings. At the same time, the intention to attract only female occupants allayed traditional community suspicions about the immorality of single men and women inhabiting shared residential accommodation. By insisting that Bulolo Flats were designed for women only, the stigma of "fast" or "loose" being applied to the young unmarried female occupants was removed.

Although quite fashionable in Sydney and in London, flats designed especially for single women were uncommon in Queensland, and no other self-contained block for this purpose is known to have been purpose-constructed in Brisbane in the interwar period. Sometimes referred to as "bachelor flats", they were distinguished from one-bedroom flats in that the bedroom and sitting room were combined, with a small kitchenette attached (sometimes just an alcove with a sink and single gas burner). Bachelor flats often had shared bathrooms, water closets and laundries, and were in reality tenements, not self-contained flats. For example, the only other identified, purpose-built interwar flat/tenement building in Brisbane designed expressly to accommodate single girls was St Helier, a block of six brick tenements erected in 1930 in Grey St, South Brisbane (no longer extant). Each apartment comprised a bed-sitting room with kitchenette. Bathrooms and water closets were shared – one bath per three persons – and there was a common laundry. In 1932 a second storey was added, comprising three tenements and an owner's flat of six rooms. Similarly, a few blocks of "bachelor flats" or tenements were erected in Brisbane for single men – such as Donegal (1934 and 1936) on St Paul's Terrace in Fortitude Valley. Bulolo was unusual in that, although designed along the lines of "bachelor flats", the apartments were self-contained with private bathrooms and water closets.

Bulolo was erected in the vanguard of the revival in Brisbane residential construction following the economic depression of the early 1930s. A chronic housing shortage in Brisbane had been exacerbated by the Depression and the collapsed of the residential construction industry. With many young couples unable to afford to purchase land and take on house repayments the demand for rental accommodation intensified, and in this environment small flat developments, both purpose-designed and house conversions, were proving attractive investments for small-scale developers. For a large enterprise such as TC Beirne (Pty) Ltd, however, the construction of Bulolo Flats was a philanthropic gesture rather than an investment opportunity, providing employment during construction and much-needed residential accommodation for young women during an accommodation shortage.

Title to the site of Bulolo Flats was acquired by TC Beirne (Pty) Ltd early in 1934; in July that year Council building approval was obtained to erect a block of flats to cost £4,500 and work commenced the same month. The contractor was PH Turner & Co. and the building was designed by architects Hennessy, Hennessy and Co.

Hennessy, Hennessy and Co. was a Sydney-based architectural firm with branch offices in Brisbane and Melbourne. The firm had been established in Sydney in 1884 by John Francis Hennessy and Joseph I Sheerin as Hennessy and Sheerin. Both were devout Catholics and friends of Archbishop of Sydney (later Cardinal) Patrick Francis Moran, and their firm designed extensively for the Catholic Church in New South Wales. In 1912 Sheerin left the practice; his place was taken by Hennessy's son Jack Francis Hennessy, junior and the firm was renamed Hennessy and Hennessy. The Brisbane office was established in 1916 in association with Brisbane architect Francis Richard Hall (Hennessy and Hennessy and FR Hall). In 1925 Jack Donoghue was the Brisbane partner (Hennessy, Hennessy, Keesing and Co. and JP Donoghue). Leo Joseph Drinan was manager of the Brisbane office 1924–1927 and Brisbane partner/manager from 1928 to 1967. Like the Hennessys, Hall, Donoghue and Drinan were all Catholics with close connections to the Church in Queensland. Jack Francis Hennessy, junior, the principal of this firm in the interwar period, was TC Beirne's son-in-law, having married Stella Beirne in 1922.

Hennessy, Hennessy and Co.'s work for the Catholic Church in Queensland included Villa Maria Convent on St Paul's Terrace, Fortitude Valley and plans for the Holy Name Cathedral, also in Fortitude Valley, which did not come to fruition. Hennessy, Hennessy and Co. were leading practitioners of mainstream interwar styles such as Spanish Mission and Romanesque and many of their buildings featured textured face brickwork, as in Bulolo Flats.

The name of the flats appears to have been derived from the Bulolo goldfield in the Central Highlands of Papua New Guinea, southwest of Lae. The site of a rush in 1934 when these flats were constructed, the Bulolo field was attracting much Australian interest and investment.

Bulolo Flats remained the property of TC Beirne (Pty) Ltd / TC Beirne Ltd / Duncan Street Properties (Pty) Ltd until 1955. The flats remain in single ownership and have not been strata-titled.

== Description ==
Bulolo Flats occupies most of a narrow, slightly sloping site at the southern end of busy McLachlan Street, Fortitude Valley, on the eastern side of the street, close to the northern exit from the Story Bridge, and one allotment south of the intersection of McLachlan and Brunswick streets.

It is a two-storeyed brick building comprising eight one-bedroom brick flats, four flats per floor, accessed via a central entrance from McLachlan Street. The roof is hidden behind front and side parapets. A laundry block is accommodated on the roof, at the rear. This has a flat roof behind its own parapet. On each side elevation, a centrally- positioned recess accommodates timber stairs and landings that once functioned as the service stairs, and now serve as fire-escapes only. The upper floor flats and front ground-floor flats each have a door opening onto the service stair. The two rear ground-floor flats have a back door opening to the narrow spaces along the sides of the building. At each side of the building three brick steps lead from the street to these side spaces, which once provided side access to the service door of each flat. This access is now gated. There is a brick planter box each side of the front entrance, occupying a narrow space between the front wall of the building and the street boundary.

It is a well-executed building in both design and workmanship, with brickwork used for simple decorative effect in the exterior elevations. The exterior walls are of face-brick, of a flecked, mostly red-orange hue. The plinth, which is deeper at the front where the ground slopes to McLachlan Street, is of cream brick. Exterior decorative detailing – such as to window sills, around the top of the planter boxes, and along the top of the parapet to the side and front elevations – is in dark brown, salt-glazed brick.

The front elevation to McLachlan Street is divided into three bays, delineated by simple brick pilasters which rise above the level of the parapet. In the two front side bays, on each level, former sleep-outs have been enclosed with fixed glass panels in aluminium frames. In the central bay, on the upper level, there is a fixed glass window with an aluminium frame; on the lower level a central entrance porch has been constructed over the original stairs. Above the porch is a rendered panel with the name of the building, BULOLO, in low relief "Art Deco" style lettering.

The decorative detailing in the front elevation is simple but effective, and includes: the use of polychromatic brickwork in the parapet; the use of multiple brick pilasters at the corners of the building; the creation of textured effects using expressed brickwork; and the incorporation of six small "grotesques", two in each of the front bays, at about the height of the upper floor.

== Heritage listing ==
Bulolo Flats was listed on the Queensland Heritage Register on 13 November 2008 having satisfied the following criteria.

The place is important in demonstrating the evolution or pattern of Queensland's history.

Bulolo Flats, constructed in 1934, is important for its association with the provision of residential accommodation for women in Brisbane during a period of chronic, bordering on acute, housing shortage. It was one of the few residential establishments of its type constructed in Brisbane at this period, and was an attempt to address contemporary community concerns about the moral "evils" of single men and women together in other forms of shared residential accommodation of the period, such as boarding houses, guest houses, and private hotels. The place also demonstrates contemporary community recognition that modern young women were seeking an independent lifestyle outside the family home.

Brisbane attracted the greatest percentage of residential flat developments in the State during the interwar years, and from late 1933 the erection of purpose-designed, purpose-built blocks of residential flats led the recovery in Brisbane residential construction following the severe and widespread economic depression of the early 1930s. Construction of Bulolo Flats in 1934 was in the vanguard of this activity.

The place demonstrates rare, uncommon or endangered aspects of Queensland's cultural heritage.

Bulolo Flats is an uncommon Queensland example of purpose-built residential flats of the interwar period intended to accommodate single women only. Unlike some other "bachelor flats" or "flats for business girls" of this period, in which bathrooms and lavatories were shared, the Bulolo Flats, although essentially bed-sits, were self-contained, with private bathroom, water closet and kitchenette.

The place is important in demonstrating the principal characteristics of a particular class of cultural places.

Bulolo Flats remains highly intact. As an excellent example of its type it is important in demonstrating the principal characteristics of a well-designed, well-constructed, domestic-scale block of self-contained residential flats for single women. Each small flat contains a bed-sitting room, sleep-out, kitchenette, bathroom, water closet, built-in cupboards, and front and rear (trades) entrances. Common areas include the central street entrance, halls, stairwells and the former shared laundry facilities on the rooftop. The lack of provision of garaging is consistent with its interwar purpose as flats for young women residing within easy walking distance of their place of work. Decorative details such as the planter boxes at the front, either side of the entrance stairs; the stylistic concerns with utilising brickwork for decorative purposes (including salt-glazed highlights and patterns in a darker colour brick and the incorporation of dramatic pilasters to the exterior); and the incorporation of small "grotesques" in the front elevation; remain intact.

The place is an excellent example of the domestic work of the architectural firm of Hennessy, Hennessy and Co. in Queensland. The firm received a large number of commissions from the Catholic church in Queensland, and they are better known for their design work in convents, church schools, churches and presbyteries throughout the south-east of the State. In Bulolo, their concern with Romanesque stylistic influences so often found in their institutional work and of which they were leading practitioners, is apparent in their domestic design work as well.

The place has a special association with the life or work of a particular person, group or organisation of importance in Queensland's history.

The place has a special association with TC Beirne, a prominent Queensland businessman and politician, for whom the flats were erected. It remains strong evidence of his compassion as an employer and as a committed Catholic and humanitarian, which earned him the respect of his staff and of the Queensland community generally.
