= O'Beirne =

O'Beirne may refer to:

- Frank O'Beirne (1898–1978), farmer, businessman, Irish Republican activist and Fianna Fáil politician in County Sligo
- Joseph O'Beirne (1900–1980), Irish professional footballer who played as an inside forward
- Kate O'Beirne (1949–2017), Washington editor of National Review
- Paul O'Beirne (also known by the pseudonym Apollo 9), American saxophonist notable as a member of Rocket from the Crypt
- Thomas O'Beirne (1749–1823), Anglican bishop, Bishop of Ossory from 1795 to 1798 when he was translated to Meath

== See also ==
- Beirne (disambiguation)
- Mount O'Beirne, located on the border of Alberta and British Columbia
