= James McWhirter =

Australian businessman (1848 - 1925)

- Born: 1848
- Died: 22 July 1925 (aged 76–77)
- Occupation: Businessman
- Known for: McWhirters Ltd

James McWhirter (1848 - 22 July 1925) was an Australian businessman. He founded the prominent Brisbane department store McWhirters Ltd.

McWhirter was born in Maybole in Ayrshire in Scotland. He went to Ayr in 1869 and became an apprentice draper, later entering into partnership with Matthew Scott as McWhirter & Scott. McWhirter migrated to Australia in 1878 and worked for D. L. Brown & Co. until 1883. He then entered into a drapery partnership with Duncan Sinclair in Stanley Street, South Brisbane, but sold his stake to Sinclair some years later and returned to working for Brown. In March 1894, amidst the 1890s Australian depression, McWhirter sold up in Brisbane and returned to England, but found economic conditions in London even worse when he arrived in May and returned to Australia in July. Upon his return, he entered into partnership with Thomas Beirne in his eponymous Fortitude Valley department store, T. C. Beirne.

In 1898, he left the Beirne partnership and opened his own store, McWhirter & Son, across Brunswick Street from the Beirne store on 25 September 1898. He acquired surrounding properties in subsequent years and built a new five-storey department store in 1912. McWhirter Sr operated the business with his son, James McWhirter Jr, for many years, but McWhirter Jr died suddenly in 1919 and the business was reformed into a listed company, McWhirters Ltd, in 1920. He remained the managing director of the company until his death. McWhirter Sr died in London in 1925 after a period of ill health.
