= Una Prentice =

Australian lawyer (1913–1986)

Una Gailey Prentice (1913–1986) was one of the first female lawyers in Australia.

Prentice was the first graduate of the University of Queensland Law school in Queensland of either gender. On 28 September 1938, she was also the first woman law graduate admitted to the bar in Queensland. She went on to be the first woman prosecutor for the Australian Commonwealth Crown Solicitor and the first female librarian of the University of Queensland Law Library.

== Early life ==
Una Gailey Prentice (née Bick) was the daughter of Ernest and Jean Bick. Her father was curator of the Brisbane Botanic Gardens from 1917 until his retirement in 1940, and her home was within the Botanic Gardens in the Curator's Cottage near the site of the University of Queensland's campus at Garden's Point, where the Queensland University of Technology now stands.

She was educated at St. Margaret's College, Ascot and awarded a Bachelor of Arts from the University of Queensland in 1935, where she studied English, Philosophy, Latin, Biology, Roman Law, Constitutional History and Political Science. She then went on to be part of the first cohort of students to study law at the University of Queensland, after the opening of the TC Bierne School of Law in 1936. Her position as the first law graduate came about because the graduands were presented to receive their degrees in alphabetical order, and she was ahead of the two men who graduated with her. She herself noted that she was "in the right place at the right time" to achieve this notable distinction. She graduated on 29 April 1938.

== Career ==
Her enrolment at university was opposed by the Dean, and initially she encountered considerable opposition to her employment, because she was a woman. No solicitor she approached would employ a female article clerk, and she was unable to obtain employment in a government department. Eventually, she accepted an offer to catalogue the book collection of Sir James Blair, who had just retired as Chief Justice, and which became the core collection of the Law Library of the University of Queensland. During World War two there was a shortage of lawyers and she was offered a job with the Commonwealth Crown Solicitor in 1940. She was the first female lawyer to be employed in the department and performed legal and bookkeeping duties. However, she was paid as a typist, the only salary scale for women working in the department.

However, after the war, in 1946, she joined the Brisbane firm of Stephens & Tozer. She married Anthony Graham Prentice on 8 June 1946. Her husband, who had served in the 2/26 Australian Infantry Battalion in World War II and was captured in Malaya by the Japanese and a prisoner of war in Singapore, was also a lawyer. On the birth of her first child, Roger, resigned to raise a family but became the Australian President of the Business and Professional Women's Association. In 1985 she was awarded an honorary doctorate from the University of Queensland, which recognised her contribution to women, the legal profession and also the university, through the Alumni Association.

== Legacy ==
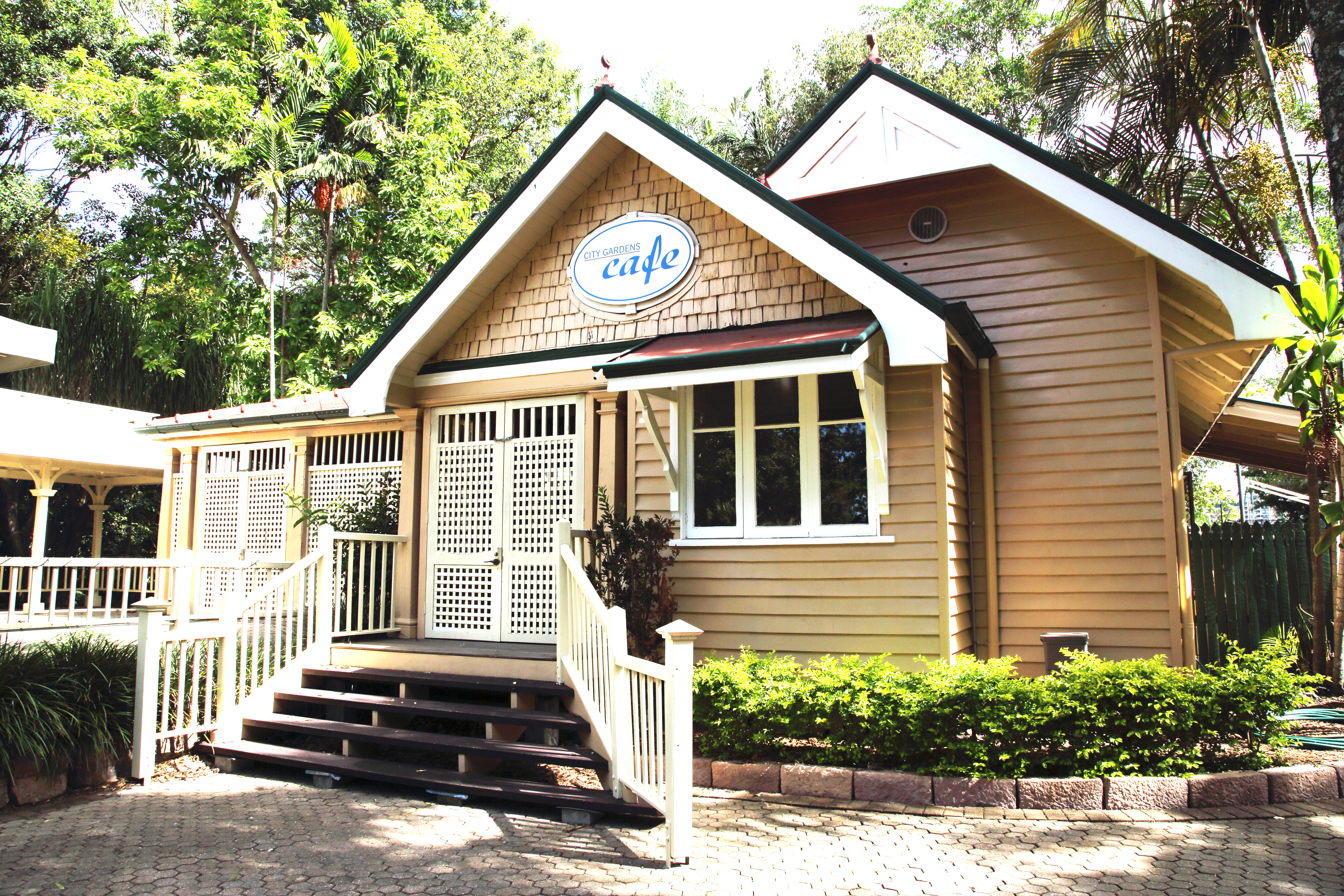
Brisbane City Botanic Gardens curator's house (now a cafe)

She died in 1986 after battling with cancer. A garden, the Una Prentice Memorial Gardens, was established on the grounds of the University of Queensland at St. Lucia, in her memory, funded by the Alumni Association and private gifts.

A prize is also awarded in her memory. Una Prentice left a bequest to enable the award, which is also supported by the College of Law as an ongoing sponsor. The Women Lawyers Association of Queensland (WLAQ) honours and celebrates her memory by recognising the achievements of the highest graduating female law student at each of the Law Schools across Queensland. In 2016 Georgia Williams was the Una Prentice Award, achieving the highest GPA (6.815) among the women in her year of study at the University of Queensland. The 2015 winners were Georgia Williams (University of Queensland), Ashley Rooney (Bond University), Tabetha Hilliard (Central Queensland University), Shae-Lee Hourigan (Griffith University), Grace O'Connor (James Cook University), Natasha Gromof (Queensland University of Technology), and Louise Hill (University of Southern Queensland)

She also was the author of a book Diamantina, Lady Bowen, Queensland's first lady, published by the Queensland Women's Historical Association in 1984, about the life of Lady Bowen, wife of the first Governor of Queensland, George Bowen.
