= River City Labs =

Australian coworking space

- Industry: Coworking space
- Founded: 2012
- Founder: Steve Baxter
- Headquarters: Brisbane, Australia
- Number of locations: 1
- Key people: Laura Ashmole (Head of Growth); Steve Baxter (Founder)
- Website: www.rivercitylabs.net

River City Labs is an Australian coworking space and accelerator founded in 2012.

== History ==
River City Labs was founded by tech entrepreneur Steve Baxter to support the entrepreneurial scene in Queensland. River City Labs provides a coworking space, mentoring, workshops and other services to help members develop their concepts into businesses.

In 2015, River City Labs was able to expand into the accelerator space, dubbed RCL Accelerator, due to a partnership with the Telstra backed muru-D accelerator program. In late 2015 River City Labs announced plans to double in size. In 2017 Shoes of Prey co-founder Mike Knapp and Reload Media Founder Llew Jury were appointed joint Entrepreneurs-in-Residence (EIR)

In 2017, River City Labs more than doubled in size after moving into the T.C. Beirne Building, as part of the Queensland Government's Startup Precinct initiative. Other tenants include the CSIRO's Data61.
