= Shell House, Brisbane =

Heritage-listed building in Brisbane, Queensland

Coordinates: 27.465205°S 153.027796°E

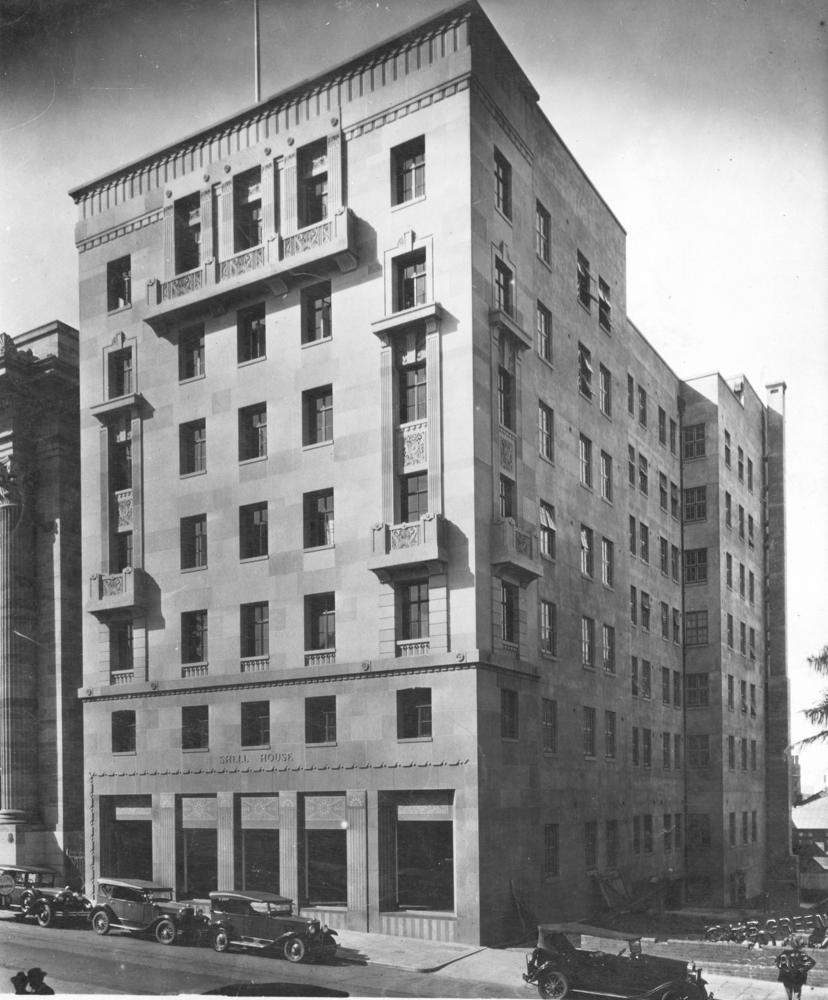
August 1933

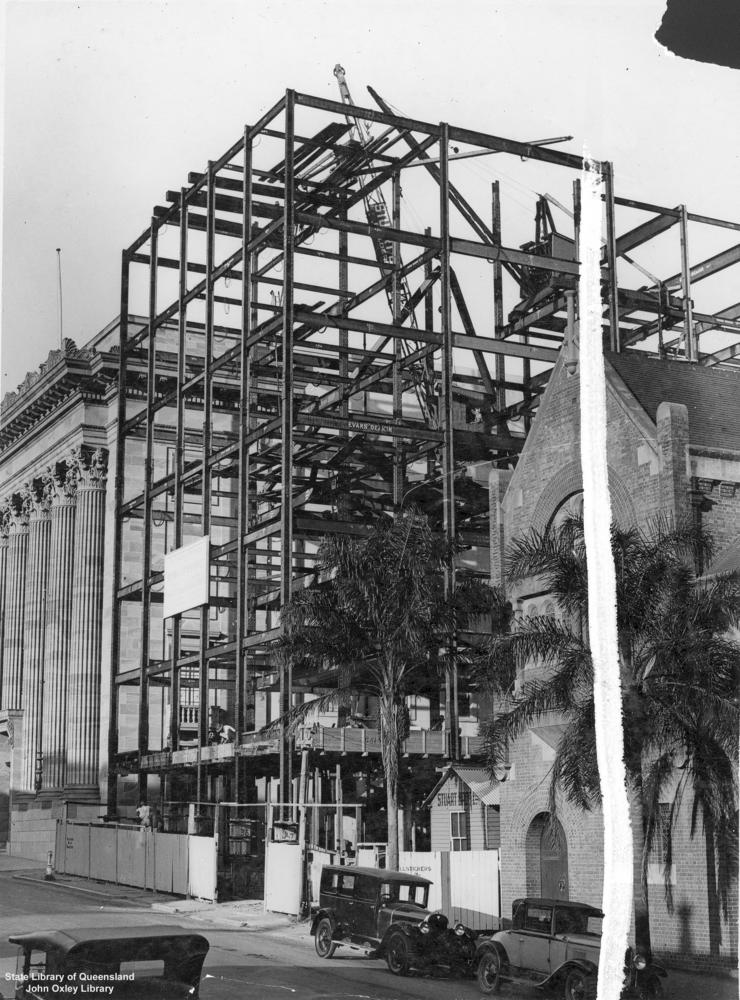
Scaffolding surrounding Shell House under construction, c. 1932

Shell House is a heritage-listed building at 301 Ann Street in the Brisbane central business district, Queensland, Australia. It was entered in the Register of the National Estate on 30 May 1995, when it was called the CPS Credit Society Centre.

== History ==
Designed by Brisbane architects Hall & Phillips (1929–1948), it opened in 1933 as an office building for the Shell company. It was part of a series of state offices built at that time by Shell: Shell House Adelaide in 1932, followed by Brisbane and Perth, Shell Corner in Melbourne in 1933, and at Wynyard Square in Sydney in 1938.

To the left of Shell House, which features extensive Art Deco elements, is the neoclassical Masonic Temple (1930), on its right the neo-Romanesque St Andrew's Uniting Church (1905). Before Shell House, the site was home to a stonemason.

The building – consisting of seven storeys and a basement, serviced by three lifts and a mail chute – was opened by the Deputy Premier of Queensland and Lands Minister, Percy Pease, and Hugh M. Russell MLA, president of the Brisbane Chamber of Commerce. The façade is from locally produced granite and Benedict stone (a mixture of cement and Brisbane tuff, supplied by the nearby Benedict Stone factory in Bowen Hills. The Art Deco features of Shell House include stylised shell decoration on the exterior of the building, marble wall panelling and fluted pilasters in the foyer, an elegant staircase with wrought iron balustrade, an embellished plastered ceiling, and lifts with coloured glass doors with a chevron design.

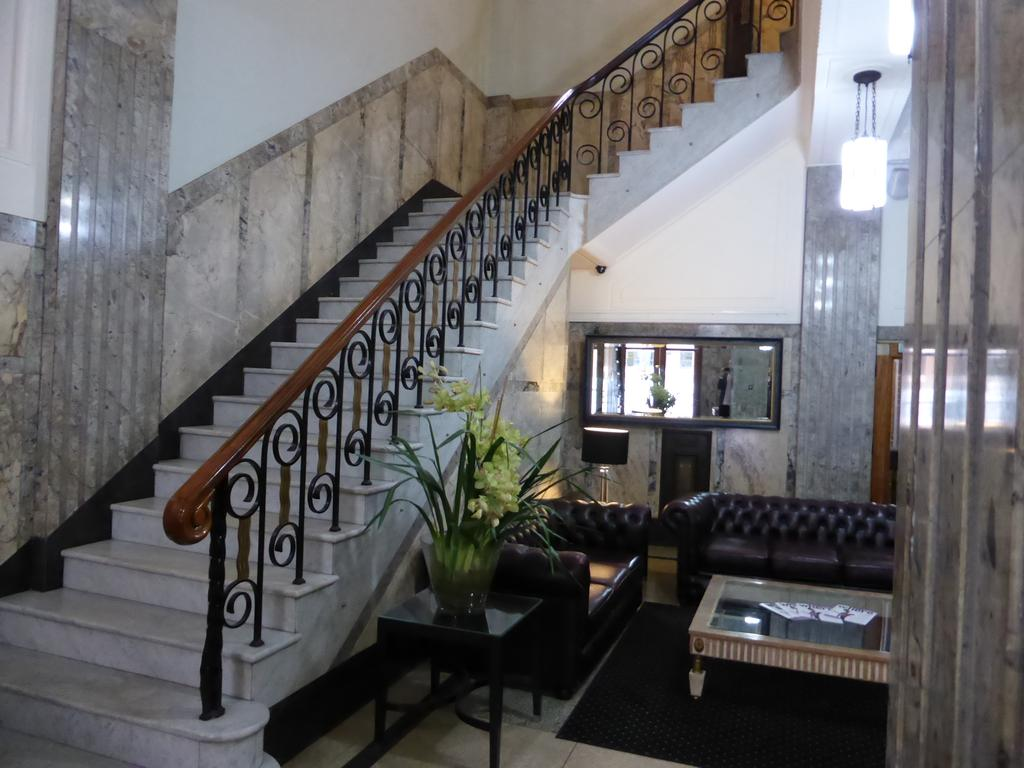
Ground floor stairs

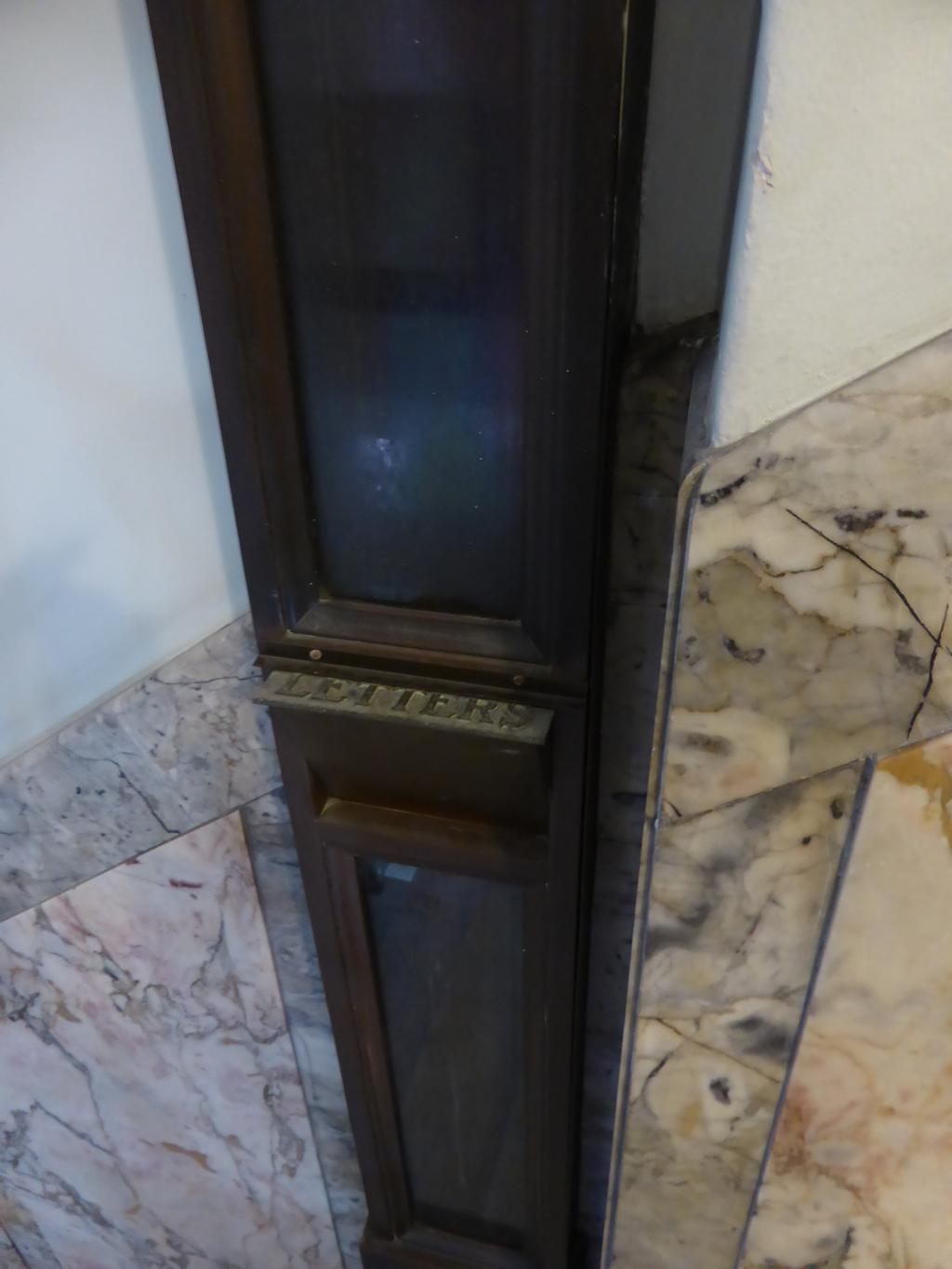
Mail chute

In 1997, the building was converted to a hotel and apartment building, Rothbury on Ann, consisting of about 60 one- and two-bedroom suites, operated by the Ultiqa group.

In 1989, Shell House was located for a while at 159 Coronation Drive, Milton.
