= Mount O'Beirne =

Mountain in Alberta and British Columbia, Canada

- Location within Alberta Location within British Columbia Location within Canada

Highest point
- Elevation: 2,637 m (8,652 ft)
- Prominence: 210 m (690 ft)
- Parent peak: Rink Peak (2664 m)
- Listing: Mountains of Alberta; Mountains of British Columbia
- Coordinates: 52°54′49″N 118°37′17″W

Geography
- Country: Canada
- Provinces: Alberta and British Columbia
- Parent range: Park Ranges
- Topo map: NTS 83D15 Lucerne

Mount O'Beirne is a mountain in the Continental Ranges on the border of Alberta and British Columbia. It is Alberta's 59th most prominent mountain. It was named in 1918 by Arthur Oliver Wheeler after Eugene Francis O'Beirne, a "sponger and general pest" who in 1864 had attached himself to William Wentworth-FitzWilliam, Viscount Milton and Walter Butler Cheadle's expedition over the Yellowhead Pass.

== See also ==
- List of peaks on the British Columbia–Alberta border
