= TC Beirne Department Store =

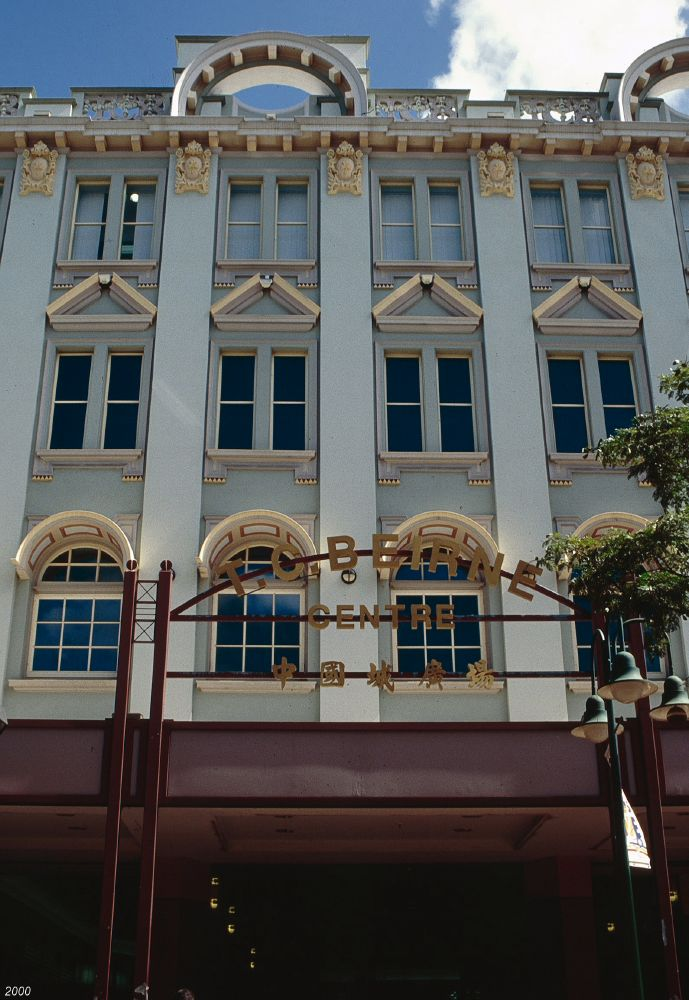
- Former TC Beirne Department Store, 2000

- Location within Queensland Location within Australia
- 27.4585°S 153.034°E
- Location: 28 Duncan Street, Fortitude Valley, Queensland, Australia

History
- Design period: 1900–1914
- Built: 1902–1938
- Built for: Thomas Charles Beirne

Site notes
- Architect(s): Robin Dods, Hennessey & Hennessey

Queensland Heritage Register
- Official name: TC Beirne Complex and Fortuneland Centre
- Type: state heritage (built)
- Designated: 12 December 2003
- Reference no.: 601395
- Significant period: 1900s–1930s (fabric); 1902–1956 (historical ownership by TC Beirne)
- Significant components: tower

The TC Beirne Department Store is a heritage-listed former department store at 28 Duncan Street, Fortitude Valley, Queensland, Australia. It was designed by Robin Dods and built in 1902. Further extensions were made through to 1938 to the designs of Dods and Hennessey & Hennessey.

== History ==
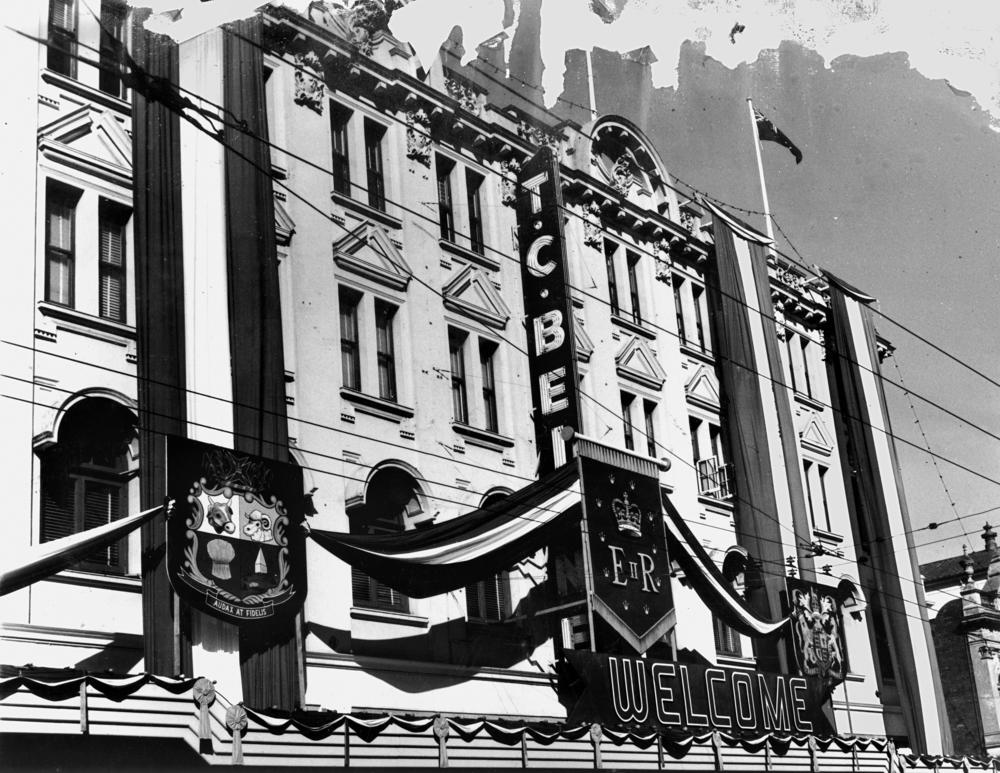
TC Beirne Department Store, decorated with Queensland's Coat of Arms and the Royal Coat of Arms, for the visit of Queen Elizabeth II in 1954

The TC Beirne Department Store was built for Thomas Charles Beirne in 1902 to the design of Robin Dods. The warehouse portion of the building was extended in 1906, and further extensions were made to the structure in 1910 and 1913, also to the design of Dods. By c. 1931, architects Hennessey & Hennessey had undertaken extensive additions, and in 1938 an extra 30,000 square feet of floor space was added. In 1956 the building was sold to David Jones, and has changed ownership several times since. Geoffrey Pie undertook alterations in 1974.

Thomas Charles Beirne was born in 1860 in Ballymacurly, Ireland, the son of farmers. He was apprenticed to a draper at the age of 14, and in 1884 emigrated to Melbourne, Australia where he worked as a draper's assistant and later joint manager for Eyre & Shephard and then Foy & Gibson. Less than two years later a former employer in Ireland, Michael Piggott, invited Beirne to enter into a partnership and the firm of Piggott & Beirne was established in Stanley Street, South Brisbane. By 1891 the partnership had dissolved and TC Beirne took his capital of £1,200 and opened his own store in Brunswick Street, Fortitude Valley, in premises owned by the Anglican Diocese of Brisbane. The shop employed six staff and had a frontage of twenty feet and a depth of fifty feet. TC Beirne had married Ann Kavanagh in 1887, and the Beirne family lived in quarters above the shop.

The success of TC Beirne's store was immediate, and within a few months of opening, the store underwent an expansion into a second and then a third adjoining shop. Beirne attempted to have the owner of the shops, the Anglican Diocese, pay to convert the shops into one store. When this request was rejected, TC Beirne purchased the Diocese holdings in Brunswick Street in 1897 for £8,000 on a deposit of £50. The property consisted of five shops and a bank. Architect William Hodgen, junior designed extensive alterations to the property.

By this time, the Beirne family had moved from their quarters above the shop to "Clevelard", Moray Street, New Farm. In 1899 the family moved again to Glengariff, Hendra where additions to the residence were made in 1907 to the design of Dods. Robin Dods was also the architect of a house built for Beirne's eldest daughter, Mrs Morgan, in 1912 (now located at 9 Morgan Street, Albion).

The growth and expansion of TC Beirne & Co. continued for the greater half of the twentieth century. Within a few years of the purchase of the Brunswick Street property, Beirne acquired adjoining properties in Duncan Street. The company was eventually to boast a Brunswick Street frontage of 146 feet (45 m), a Duncan Street frontage of 311 feet (95 m), and an Ann Street frontage of 62 feet (19 m). The shop floor areas fronted Brunswick Street, and warehousing areas were located along Duncan and Ann Streets.

In 1902 Robin Dods of the architectural firm Hall & Dods, was commissioned to design the building that was to form the core of the present structure. Additions to the company's warehousing facilities followed in 1906 when Hall & Dods called tenders for "premises, Duncan Street, Valley, for TC Beirne & Co.". Master Builder, George Albert Baumber, completed the work at a cost of £6348. Other major work was completed in 1910 and 1913, also to the design of Robin Dods. Baumber's tender was accepted in 1909, while the work completed in 1913 included a "new storey and other additions, besides the modernising of the Brunswick Street premises at a cost of about £25,000". This work increased the number of arches on the parapet from two to three.

Less than twenty years later, c. 1931, further extensions were made. Architects Hennessey & Hennessey were responsible for the additions. In 1938, 30,000 square feet of floor space was added by contractors GH Turner & Son at a cost of £30,000. The work was completed using structural steel, reinforced concrete and brick, and included the additions of a five-storey building to the Brunswick Street frontage of Beirne's property; and the addition of four storeys on the Duncan Street side of the building.

The success of the TC Beirne & Co. emporium extended outside Brisbane and branches of the store were established in the cities of Ipswich and Mackay, where buildings designed by Robin Dods were erected in 1902 (Ipswich) and 1907 (Mackay). TC Beirne also established a popular and successful mail-order service, extending the company's clientele base into more remote locations.

The early history of another Valley success story, McWhirter's, is directly linked to TC Beirne and Co. In 1894, James McWhirter joined TC Beirne as general manager and temporary partner before leaving to occupy premises on the opposite of Brunswick Street. Like Beirne, McWhirter was an instant success and the two stores, along with other principal retailers, Overells and later the ACB Company and Waltons, did much to ensure the popularity of Fortitude Valley as a shopping destination in the first half of the twentieth century.

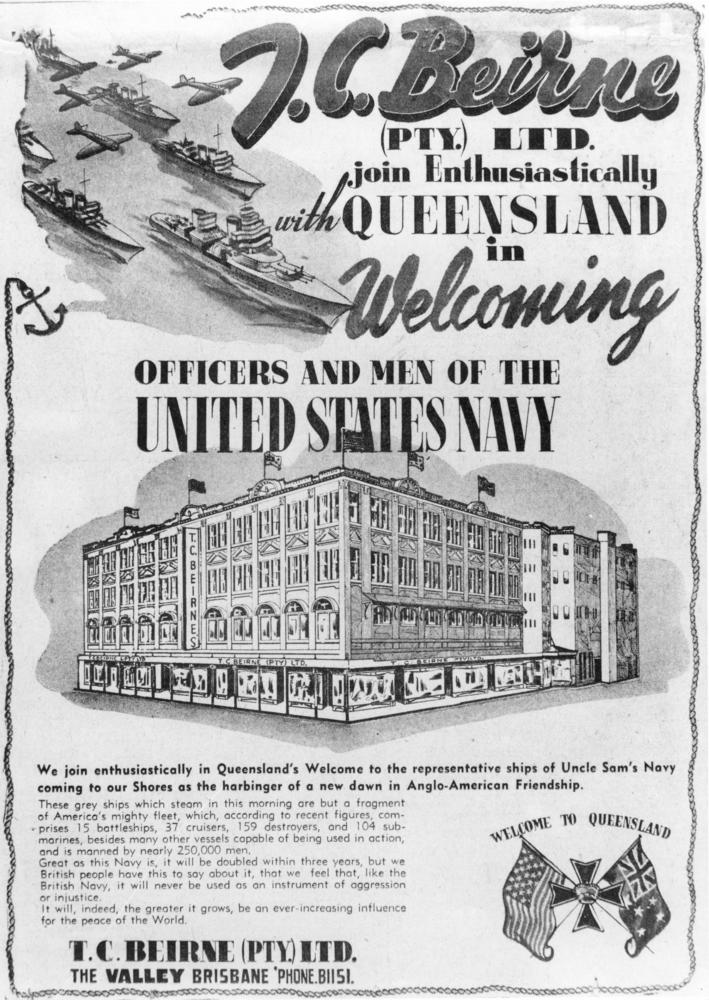
Advertisement during World War II in 1941

.

TC Beirne died on 21 April 1949. Twelve years later, in November 1961, the TC Beirne department store business, including the building and adjoining properties, was sold to Sydney based department store David Jones for £2.8 million. The store was rebranded from TC Beirne to David Jones in 1970, and closed in January 1973 following the opening of a new branch of David Jones at the Toombul Shopping Centre in October 1972. The building was sold again in 1973 and in 1974 alterations were made to the design of Geoffrey Pie. The TC Beirne building for some time housed a branch of Target.

In the mid-1990s, the TC Beirne store and the TC Beirne warehouse in Duncan Street to the rear became separately owned. Both buildings have undergone extensive internal alteration and refurbishment and now contain commercial and retail outlets on the lower level and apartments on the upper floors. The TC Beirne Centre also contains offices of the Brisbane City Council. The former warehouse, now Fortuneland Centre, has been subdivided into 49 strata titles.

== Description ==
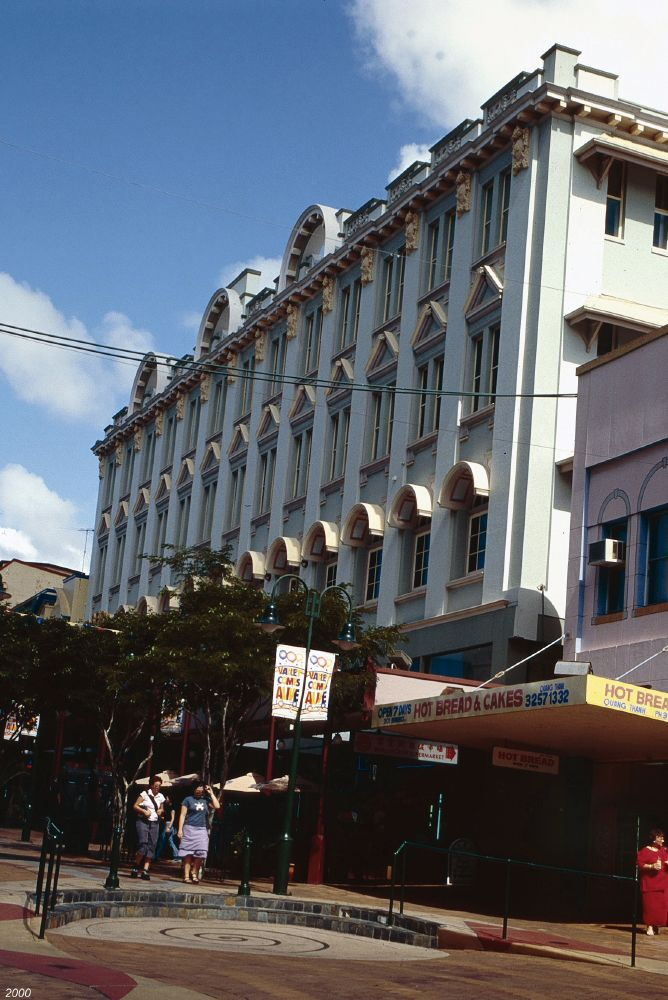
Former TC Beirne Department Store in the Brunswick Street Mall streetscale, 2000

The TC Beirne Department Store occupies a prominent position overlooking the pedestrian thoroughfares of Brunswick and Duncan Streets, Fortitude Valley. Ann Street borders the eastern extreme of the Duncan Street side of the complex. The portion of the complex once used by the company as retail trading space fronts Brunswick Street and is now known as the TC Beirne Centre, while the Fortuneland Centre, once the warehouse, fronts Duncan Street which is now Chinatown.

=== The TC Beirne Centre ===
The Brunswick Street elevation is four storeys high and is constructed of rendered and painted masonry. There are thirteen windows on each floor, arranged in vertical panels between flat pilasters and becoming successively less decorated. The first floor windows are casements with semi-circular fanlights and distinctive projecting arched hoods. The second and third floor windows consist of pairs of rectangular sash windows with decorative moulding below the sill and around the frame. Moulded triangular pediments top the second floor windows. The top of each pilaster consists of a shamrock crest, positioned directly below a dentilled cornice.

Above the projecting cornice, the pilasters are extended with recessed panels between them to form a decorative parapet. The recessed panels are infilled with masonry circles that shape the initials TCB and all the panels are topped with a flat moulded capping. The building is topped with large arched pediments, originally two in number, and then increased to three when the building was extended. The entrance and ground floor shop fronts are modern.

The interior has been largely replaced and now has an arcade with retail shops through to Duncan Street on the ground floor and modern offices and apartments on the upper floors. In the centre of the building what appears to have been a clerestory is preserved together with its ceiling decoration. The floors below it have been replaced by metal girders to create a light well. No other original internal decoration can be readily seen.

The Duncan Street section of the complex is five storeys high and is of painted brick. Generally, the windows are segmental arches, except on the eastern bay, which has semi-circular arched windows on the first and fourth floors, with square headed windows between. Bold Dutch gables unify the different buildings. The brick parapet has a stepped top with semi-circular pediments and circular vents. Alterations include a wide modern arcade entrance and a glass and metal overhead tunnel, designed by James Birrell, that links the centre to the buildings on the other side of Duncan Street. The shopfronts are now all modern metal and glass, though some of the metal pillars supporting the street awning survive.

The Queensland Government (Department of Science, Information Technology and Innovation, DSITI) will open a Start-Up Precinct in TC Beirne Building in October 2016 as part of Advance Queensland program. River City Labs and CSIRO's Data61 will be first tenants.

=== Fortuneland Centre ===
The former warehouse is constructed of painted brick and has its major elevation to Duncan Street adjoining the main store buildings. The building has four storeys and a low brick tower to Duncan Street, similar to that on the TC Beirne section. The building has large segmental arch windows to the upper floors, those on the Duncan Street side being the original timber-framed windows and those on the Ann Street elevation have modern metal frames. The top floor is composed largely of banks of multiple-paned windows between narrow brick panels. The rear of the building overlooks a laneway and modern windows and small metal balconies have been added, as has a deck area.

The ground floor of the Fortuneland Centre contains 12 shops and restaurants with modern glass and metal shopfronts. The display windows at the corner of Duncan and Ann Streets have been replaced, but some original metal posts supporting the street awning to Duncan and Ann Streets remain. The upper levels of the former warehouse have been reconfigured as apartments and no original internal walls remain. The basement contains a car park.

== Heritage listing ==
TC Beirne Department Store was listed on the Queensland Heritage Register on 12 December 2003 having satisfied the following criteria.

The place is important in demonstrating the evolution or pattern of Queensland's history.

The building and development of the TC Beirne Department Store is important in demonstrating the pattern and evolution of Queensland's history, reflecting the late 19th and early 20th century development of Fortitude Valley as a major commercial and shopping centre, which was sustained well into the post-Second World War period.

The place is important because of its aesthetic significance.

The TC Beirne Department Store is important because of its aesthetic significance as a prominent and visually appealing element in the pedestrian streetscapes of Brunswick Street and Duncan Street (China Town).

The place has a special association with the life or work of a particular person, group or organisation of importance in Queensland's history.

The TC Beirne Department Store has a special association with the TC Beirne company who played an important part in the development of retailing and department stores in the first half of the twentieth century. The place also has a special association with the life and work of the company's founder, Thomas Charles Beirne, and the work of architect Robin Dods.

== See also ==
- Bulolo Flats, accommodation built by T C Beirne for female staff members of his department store
