= UQ Law School =

Law school of the University of Queensland in Brisbane, Australia

Coordinates: 27°29′48.90″S 153°00′47.09″E

- UQ Law School Logo
- Motto: Inspiration; Innovation; Impact
- Parent school: University of Queensland
- Established: 1936; 89 years ago
- School type: Public university
- Dean: Rick Bigwood
- Location: Brisbane, Queensland, Australia
- Enrollment: Yearly intake of ~200
- Faculty: 93

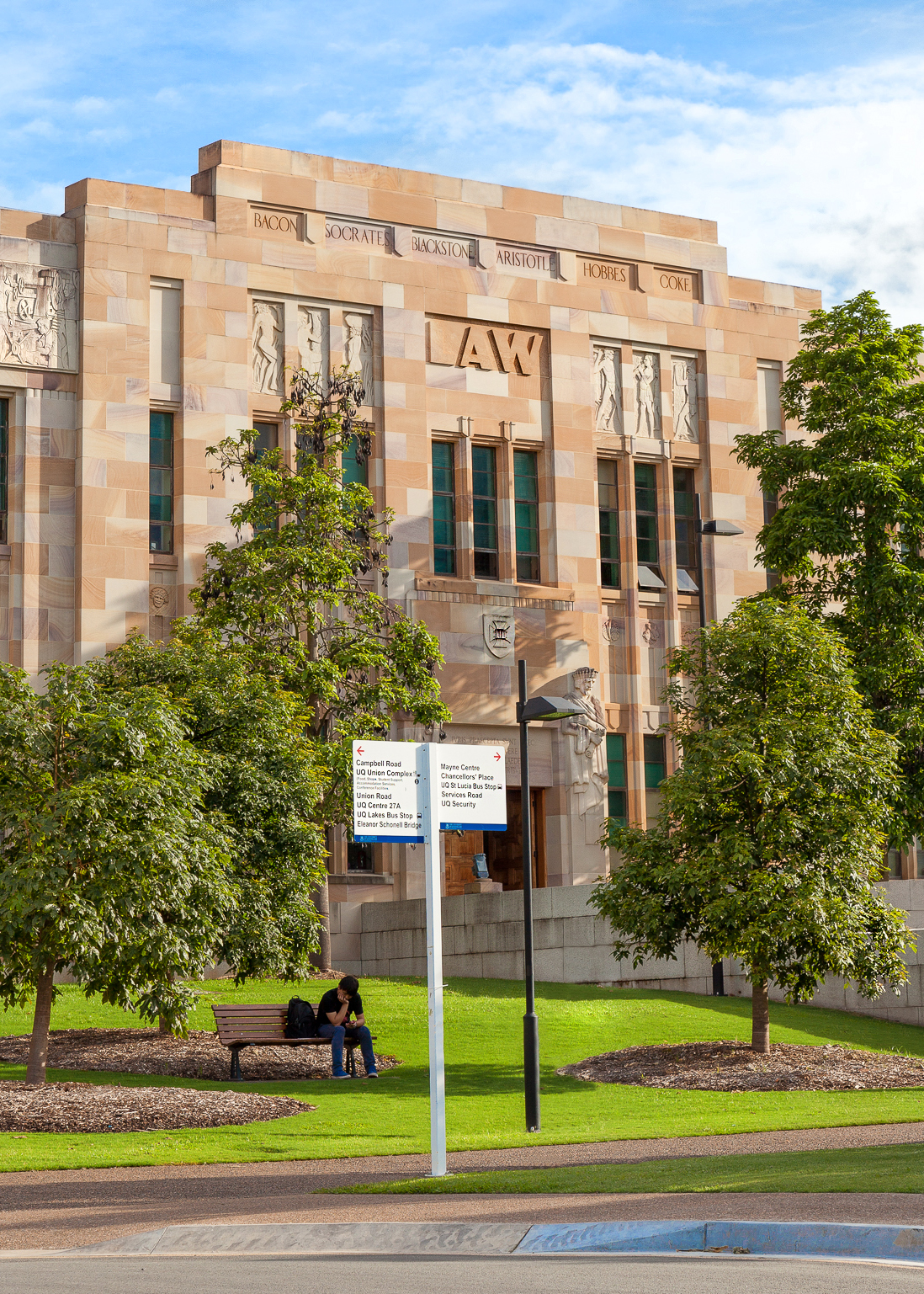
- North entry of the UQ School of Law

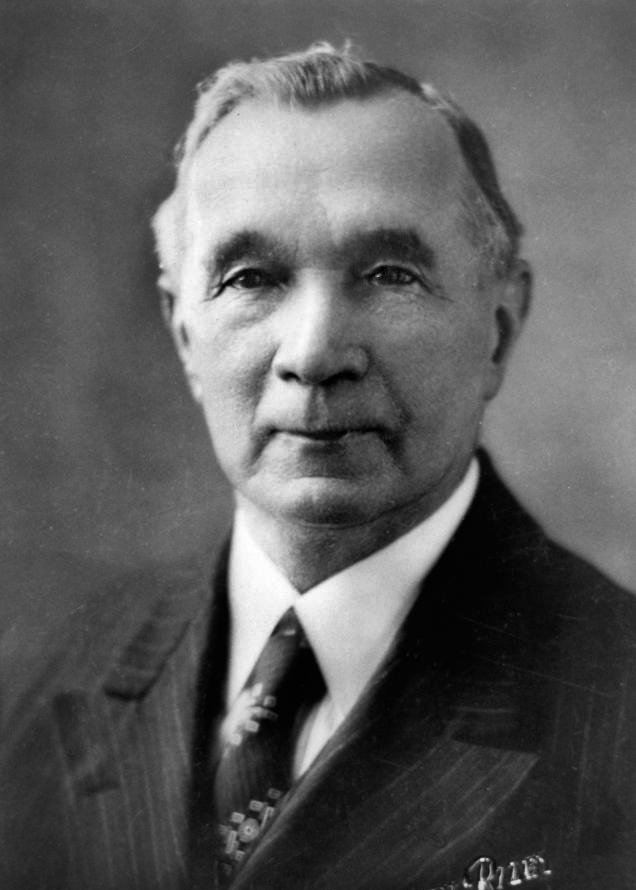
- Thomas Charles Beirne, eponym of the law school

The UQ Law School (also known as TC Beirne School of Law) is the law school of the University of Queensland in Brisbane, Australia. Founded in 1936, UQ law school is the sixth oldest law school in Australia and the oldest operating in Queensland.

The entering undergraduate class of 2023 was approximately 67 students. To date, the school has nearly 3000 alumni. Additionally, UQ Law School offers LLM, MICLaw, MICLaw/MCom, MIL, MIR/MIL, MPhil and PhD degrees.

The ULS is home to one of Australia's largest academic law libraries called the Walter Harrison Law Library. The library was built almost 70 years ago in 1949. The school has over 93 professional and academic staff. According to the University of Queensland, 81% of 300 students who had graduated from UQ Law school in 2016 had current employment.

== History ==
Although the Law School began properly teaching in 1936, a Faculty of Law was established pro forma with the foundation of the University of Queensland in 1911. This enabled the university to confer ad eundem gradum degrees, an honorary degree recognizing the award given by another university, and Doctors of Laws honoris causa, recognizing the contribution of selected persons toward the establishment of the university.

A limited number of law subjects began to be taught in 1926 when the first Garrick Professor of Law was appointed. However, this was under the ambit of the university's Faculty of Arts, as no law school had been properly established yet. In 1935 Thomas Charles Beirne endowed the university with £20,000, enabling the university's senate to officially approve the law school on 10 May 1935. In May 1936, students commenced studies under the newly formed TC Beirne School of Law.

== Reputation and student achievements ==
Since 1935, twenty-eight UQ Law graduates have won Rhodes scholarships. In 2020, two UQ law students won scholarships to study at the University of Cambridge. Eleven UQ Law students have won Fulbright Scholarships since 1955. Ten UQ Law students have won New Colombo Plan Scholarships or Mobility Grant Programs since 2014.

The UQ School of Law is well regarded as one of the world's foremost law schools for mooting; significant mooting achievements include the following:

=== Notable international advocacy competition accolades ===
- World Champions (2005, 2014, 2018) in the prestigious Philip C. Jessup International Law Moot Court Competition (currently sharing third place with University of Melbourne's Law School). Semi-Finalists (2007, 2025). Baxter Award for Best Respondent or Applicant Memorial (2004, 2014, 2017). Evans Award for Best Overall Memorial (2017). Best Applicant Side (2014, 2025). Best Respondent Side (2019, 2025). First team to win both Best Respondent Side and Best Applicant Side Awards (2025).
- World Champions (viz. winner of the Frédéric Eisemann Award) (1997, 2000) in the prestigious Willem C. Vis International Commercial Arbitration Moot. Runners-up (1998, 2002). Equal Third Place (2020). Teams from UQ Law (TCB) have been the most successful to partake in this moot (by way of moot wins and runners-up).
- World Champions (2008, 2012, 2013, 2018, 2019, 2023, 2024) in the International Maritime Law Arbitration Moot.
- World Champions (2018) (along with students from other Australian law schools) in the 17th Tokyo Negotiation and Arbitration Moot (aka Intercollegiate Negotiation Competition).
- World Champions (2015) in The Sarin Leiden International Air Law Moot Court Competition.

=== Notable domestic advocacy competition accolades ===
- Australian Champions (2013, 2020) in the Sir Harry Gibbs Constitutional Law Moot.
- Australian Champions (2001) in the ALSA Red Cross International Humanitarian Law Moot.
- Australian Champions (2016, 2018) in the Aboriginal and Torres Strait Islander Students' Moot.
- Australian Champions (2017) in the Castan Centre Human Rights Law Moot.
- Australian Champions (2014) Negotiating Outcomes on Time (NOOT) Competition.
- Australian Champions (2008, 2011, 2014) in the Administrative Appeals Tribunal National Mooting Competition.
- Australian Champions (2004, 2008, 2009, 2012) in the QUT Torts Moot Competition, making them the most successful school to partake in the moot.
- Australian Champions (2009, 2012) in the Shine Lawyers Torts Moot Competition.
- Winner (2005) National Family Law Moot Competition.

=== NICA Ranking ===
The NICA rankings evaluate law schools based on their performance in moot court competitions. The rankings consider two factors: the weight of the competitions, determined by the number of participating law schools, and the advancement of teams within these competitions. The system provides a straightforward comparison of law schools' performance in moot courts.

The UQ Law School boasts a leading mooting program, with its students consistently excelling in international moot court competitions. Between 2013 and 2023, they achieved an average world ranking of 27th and an Australian ranking of 3rd, making UQ Law School the highest-ranked law school for mooting in Australia.

UQ Law School Mooting NICA Rankings 2013-2023
	2013	2014	2015	2016	2017	2018	2019	2020	2021	2022	2023	Average
World Ranking	25th	1st	46th	22nd	13th	1st	15th	10th	106th	41st	17th	27th
Australian Ranking	5th	1st	4th	5th	3rd	1st	2nd	1st	7th	5th	1st	3rd

== Building ==
In 2015, the University of Queensland (UQ) undertook a refurbishment of the west wing of the heritage-listed Forgan Smith building. The project aimed to reimagine the School of Law and the Walter Harrison Law Library, resulting in a program restructure and a smaller cohort size. The refurbishment was completed in 2017 by Brisbane-based architecture firm BVN. The redesigned west wing of the Forgan Smith building has received recognition, including several awards:

- RAIA National Awards – Educational Architecture Award;
- RAIA National Awards – Interior Architecture Award;
- RAIA Qld Chapter – Interior Architecture Award;
- RAIA Qld Chapter – Educational Architecture Award;
- Australian Interior Design Awards Best of State Queensland – Commercial winner;
- RAIA Qld Chapter Brisbane Regional Commendation – Interior Architecture; and
- RAIA Qld Chapter Brisbane Regional Commendation – Educational Architecture.

== Academics ==
The UQ Law School is Queensland's premier law school; usually achieving the highest rank for law of any Queensland university. The UQ Law School is Australia's best academically-performing law school, as measured by the averaged QS citations per paper (CPP) and QS H-Index citations (H-index) ranking, at 27.5; ANU College of Law follows UQ Law at an averaged CPP & H-index ranking of 38.5.

University of Queensland's School of Law often appears to be Australia's foremost law school: according to Quacquarelli Symonds (QS), the school has ranked 1st (nationally) for CPP in 2017, 2018, 2019, and 2020; and 1st, 3rd, and 2nd (nationally) regarding H-index in 2018, 2019, and 2020 respectively. Globally, the school currently ranks =25th for QS' CPP metric (alongside Cambridge University's law school) and =30th for QS' H-Index citations metric.

Notably, UQ's Law School achieved a THE-WUR citation ranking of 3rd globally (1st domestically) in 2017 (THE 2018) – two positions above Yale Law School, six positions above top-ranked Duke Law School, and just one position below Harvard Law School. UQ's Law School also recently received a THE-WUR research ranking of 36th in the world (THE 2020).

=== Joint degree program ===
Since 2011, the UQ Law School established a partnership with Washington University School of Law, enabling current UQ students to pursue their UQ law degree while also obtaining an American LLM degree in a shorter timeframe.

=== Current and previous ranking positions ===
(Positions enclosed in parentheses refer to domestic ranking)

	2013	2014	2015	2016	2017	2018	2019	2020	2021	2022	2023
QS Ranking by Subject (Law)	48 (7th)	51-100 (10th)	49 (6th)	45 (7th)	48 (7th)	36 (6th)	43 (6th)	39 (6th)	43 (6th)	55 (6th)	53 (6th)
QS Citations Per Paper Ranking	-	74 (7th)	80 (5th)	76 (5th)	52 (1st)	35 (1st)	24 (1st)	25 (1st)	37 (3rd)	101+ (10th)	93 (6th)
QS H-Index Citations Ranking	-	87 (6th)	71 (6th)	53 (7th)	46 (4th)	38 (1st)	47 (3rd)	30 (=2nd)	59 (5th)	51 (5th)	74 (6th)
*THE-WUR Subject Rankings (Law)	-	-	-	-	54 (5th)	40 (4th)	58 (6th)	56 (5th)			
*THE-WUR Citations Ranking	-	-	-	-	3 (1st)	10 (2nd)	56 (7th)	67 (8th)			
*THE-WUR Research Ranking	-	-	-	-	55 (5th)	44 (4th)	36 (4th)	37 (4th)			
**ARWU Law Subject Ranking	-	-	-	-	87 (8th)	87 (7th)	60 (6th)	101-150 (2nd-8th)			
***US News (Social Sciences and Public Health)						22 (1st)	21 (2nd)	26 (2nd)			

*THE-WUR ranks ahead of the current year (e.g. the ranking(s) released in 2019 were "2020" rankings).

**The ARWU Law subject ranking does not necessarily reflect the quality of a given law school (hence why universities without law schools feature on the ranking- see Princeton University). The ARWU Law subject ranking primarily measures the amount and performance of papers which relate to Law (the ranking additionally may include papers from Law-related subjects such as Policy, Public Affairs, and Criminology- hence why Griffith University, renowned for Criminology, performs well solely on the ARWU Law subject rankings) and that are associated with, or originate out of, a given university.

*** This subject ranking includes research on social policy, political science, education, demographics, law, and public health and administration.

== UQ Law Centres ==
- Australian Centre for Private Law (ACPL)
  - The APCL aims to foster the development and understanding of private law through the means of advanced research, and seeks to effectively disseminate that research through education and professional outreach.
- Centre for Public International and Comparative Law (CPICL)
  - The CPICL is a large research centre that brings together faculty members and doctoral students to support, coordinate, promote and showcase work related to: Public International Law; Private International Law; Comparative Law; Competition Law; Constitutional Law; Administrative Law; Human Rights Law; Law of Institutions; Legal Philosophy; International Criminal and Humanitarian Law; and The Law of International Organisations.
- Marine and Shipping Law Unit (MASLU)
  - The MASLU is a community of legal scholars focused on teaching, researching and consulting services in maritime law and international law of the sea. The MASLU also collaborates with other recognised marine centres on multi-disciplinary projects, and liaises with legal and marine scholars on multiple issues.
- UQ Pro Bono Centre
  - The UQ Pro Bono Centre strives to be a national leader in developing, promoting and providing student pro bono legal services, as well as to educate about the importance of access to justice. About 30% of TC Beirne School of Law's students are registered to the pro bono program offered by the centre.

== Publications ==
The following publications are produced by staff or students at UQ Law:

- University of Queensland Law Journal (UQLJ)
  - UQLJ is one of Australia's leading law journals and, established in 1948, is arguably Australia's oldest university law journal. Unlike other university law journal publications, UQLJ's editorial board consists entirely of leading domestic and international academics, ranging from the University of Oxford to the Max Planck Institute for Comparative and International Private Law, Hamburg.
- LAWASIA Journal
  - LAWASIA Journal is a leading international law journal primarily dealing with legal issues and developments in the Asia Pacific region. LAWASIA Journal's editorial board consists entirely of legal scholars and members of the judiciary in the Asia Pacific region; such as former justice of the High Court of Australia, Michael Kirby, and former Chief Justice of India, M.N. Venkatachaliah.
- Australian and New Zealand Maritime Law Journal
  - The Australian and New Zealand Maritime Law Journal (ANZ Mar LJ) is the online incarnation of the Maritime Law Association of Australia and New Zealand Journal (MLAANZ Journal). The ANZ Mar LJ focuses on making contributions to the areas of maritime law and commerce. The ANZ Mar LJ is edited by, and features contributions from, academics as well as students.

== Notable alumni ==
Jurists

- Matt Foley (politician), former attorney-general of Queensland, former arts minister, former president of the Queensland Council for Civil Liberties, current barrister and adjunct professor at the University of Queensland.
- Francis Patrick Donovan, former ambassador and jurist.
- Walter Campbell, former governor of Queensland, former Judge of the Supreme Court of Queensland.
- Gerard Brennan, former chief justice of the High Court of Australia.
- Harry Gibbs, former chief justice of the High Court of Australia.
- Noel Power, former chief justice of the Supreme Court of Hong Kong.
- Ian Callinan, former justice of the High Court of Australia.
- William Webb, former justice of the Supreme Court of Queensland and the High Court of Australia, former president of the International Military Tribunal for the Far East.
- Patrick Keane, current justice of the High Court of Australia, former chief justice of the Federal Court of Australia.
- Quentin Bryce, former governor-general of Australia.
- Una Prentice, first graduate of the school and first female Commonwealth Prosecutor.
- Catherine Holmes, Queensland Chief Justice.
- Martin Moynihan, former justice of the Supreme Court of Queensland and Chair of the Queensland Crime and Corruption Commission
- Sarah Derrington, former Dean of the Law School, Australian Law Reform Commissioner and current Justice of the Federal Court of Australia.

Politicians, public servants and vice regals

- Queensland Premiers Annastacia Palaszczuk, Peter Beattie and Wayne Goss.
- Mark McGowan, Premier of Western Australia.
- Members of Parliament Cameron Dick, Murray Watt and Mark Ryan.
- George Brandis, former politician, current diplomat and the Australian High Commissioner to the United Kingdom.
- Paul de Jersey, former chief justice of the Supreme Court of Queensland; current governor of Queensland.
- William George Hayden, former governor-general of Australia, former minister for foreign affairs and trade, former leader of the Labor Party and Leader of the Opposition.
- Clem Jones, former lord mayor of Brisbane.
- Peter Maurice Arnison, former governor of Queensland, retired major general, former vice chancellor of Queensland University of Technology.

Business leaders

- John Story, former chancellor of the University of Queensland, former directorships in Echo Entertainment Group, CRS Ltd, Suncorp Group Ltd, Tabcorp Holdings Ltd, and Magontec Ltd.

Higher education

- Megan Davis, UNSW pro vice-chancellor indigenous, former commissioner of the NSW Land and Environment Court, UN expert member of the Permanent Forum on Indigenous Peoples.
- Leenen Forde, former chancellor of Griffith University, former Governor of Queensland.
- Llew Edwards, former chancellor of the University of Queensland, former Queensland state politician and Liberal Party leader.

Other

- Michael Ware, journalist and documentarian.

== See also ==
- University of Queensland Union (UQU)
- Group of Eight (Australian universities) – for a complete list of Group of Eight law schools and their rankings.
