= Thomas Beirne (businessman) =

Australian businessman and politician

The Hon TC Beirne KSG
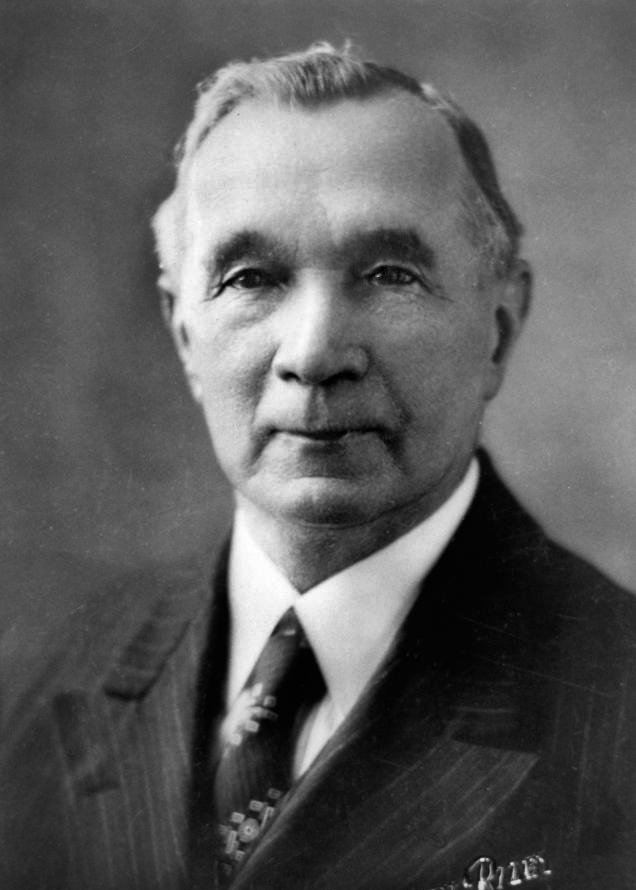

Queensland Legislative Council
- In office 27 July 1905 – 23 March 1922

Personal details
- Born: Thomas Charles Beirne; 9 September 1860 Ballymacurly, Roscommon, Ireland
- Died: 21 April 1949 (aged 88) Brisbane, Australia
- Resting place: Nudgee Cemetery
- Spouse: Annie Kavanagh (m.1887 d.1940)
- Relations: Neal Macrossan (son-in-law), Henry Douglas (son-in-law), Alex Douglas (great grandson)
- Occupation: Draper, company director

Thomas Charles Beirne KSG (1860–1949) was an early businessman, politician and philanthropist in colonial and federation era Queensland, Australia.

== Early life ==
Thomas Beirne was born on 9 July 1860 in County Roscommon at Ballymacurly, near Ballymoe, the third child of eight to parents considered to be 'the small farmer class'.

The young Beirne migrated to Melbourne on the Orient Steam Navigation Company steamer Lusitania boarding in December 1883 and arriving in February 1884. From Williamstown, seeking out work, he settled with Eyre & Shepherd as a junior salesman in the manchester department at 30 shillings a week. After being a joint manager of the Richmond branch, but not being accepted for a wage rise to 45 shillings, Beirne left Eyre & Shepherd, and started to work with Foy & Gibson until mid-1885.

== Business life ==
After a letter from Mr. M . D. Pigott, an old employer from Tuam, Ireland, and now in Brisbane, Queensland, Beirne left for Brisbane to be an equal partner in a business. He found the shop in Stanley Street disappointing, left, and found a job with Allan and Stark also on Stanley Street. With some opportunity and planning, in 1886, the firm of Pigott & Beirne was opening at Stanley Street opposite Annerley Road. After a fire to the uninsured business, the partnership was dissolved in August 1891, and Bernie with £1,200 opened a small store in Fortitude Valley, 24 feet (7.3 m) frontage and 50 feet (15 m) deep, with an overhead dwelling.

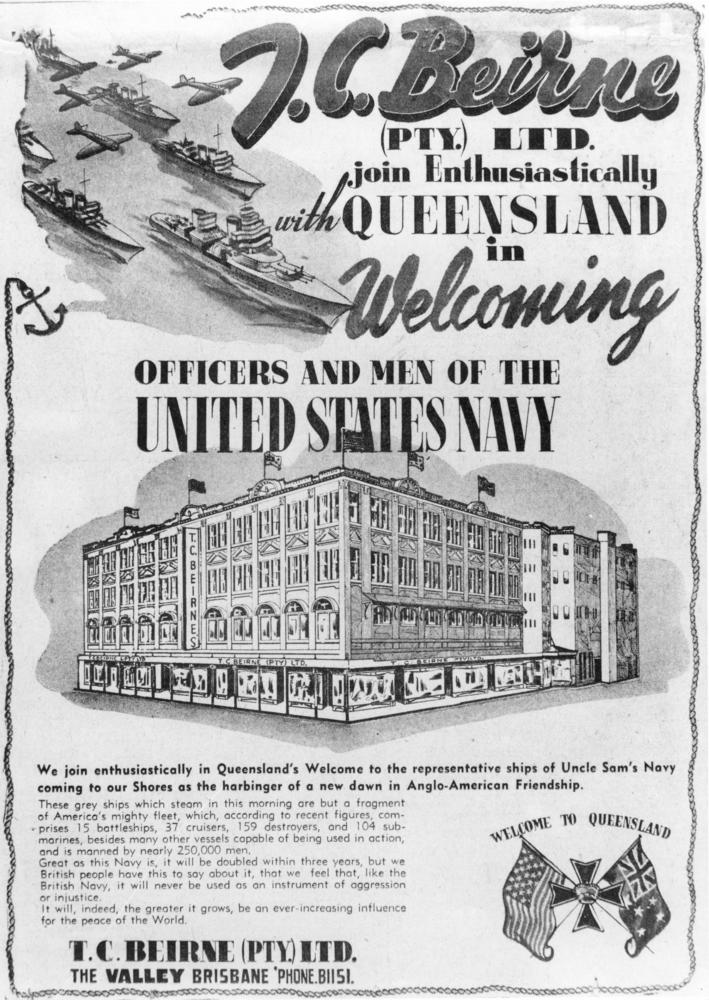
TC Beirne Department Store advertisement in the Brisbane Telegraph

These series of business ventures saw him establish a successful drapery business in Brisbane. A number of years later, T. C. Beirne and Company Proprietary Limited was registered with a nominal capital of £1 million. The TC Beirne Department Store building is now heritage-listed.

In Brisbane Beirne became an active member of the Brisbane Traders' Association, including its president in 1901. He was also a board member of Brisbane Tramway Co, Australian Mutual Provident Society, the Atlas Assurance Co and the British Australian Cotton Association.

In 2021, Beirne was inducted into the Queensland Business Leaders Hall of Fame.

== Politics ==
Bernie was involved in the early stages of the Australian Labour Party and from 1905 till 1922 he was a member of the Queensland Legislative Council.

== Benefactor ==
As one of Australia’s first millionaires, T. C. Beirne’s philanthropy assisted the development of communities in Australia Beirne was Warden of the University of Queensland and in 1935 donated £20,000 to establish the TC Beirne School of Law.

He was also a benefactor of Holy Name Cathedral, Brisbane, the Pius XII Regional Seminary at Banyo, Mater Misericordiae Hospital and Duchesne College in the University of Queensland.

He was awarded a papal knighthood of the Order of St Gregory by pope Pius XI and was a close associate with politicians William Higgs and Frank McDonnell and was friends with Archbishop James Duhig.

== Later life ==
Beirne died in 1949. His funeral, which was presided over by Archbishop James Duhig, was held at St Stephen's Cathedral and proceeded to the Nudgee Cemetery. Despite his generosity during his lifetime, he left an estate of over £1.24 million which was mainly bequeathed to his five daughters and numerous grandchildren.

The State Library of Queensland holds the T.C. Beirne company Records as well as examples of his catalogues.

== Legacy ==
Thomas Beirne is remembered today by:

- T C Beirne Park, a park that once formed part of the grounds of his Hendra home, Glengariff
- TC Beirne Department Store, now the TC Beirne Centre, a shopping centre in Fortitude Valley
- TC Beirne School of Law at the University of Queensland

A number of buildings associated with Thomas Beirne are listed on the Queensland Heritage Register, including:

- his home Glengariff in Hendra
- his retail premises TC Beirne Department Store
- accommodation built for his staff Bulolo Flats

In 2021, Beirne was inducted into the Queensland Business Leaders Hall of Fame.
