= Eagle Junction, Queensland =

Eagle Junction
- Suburb
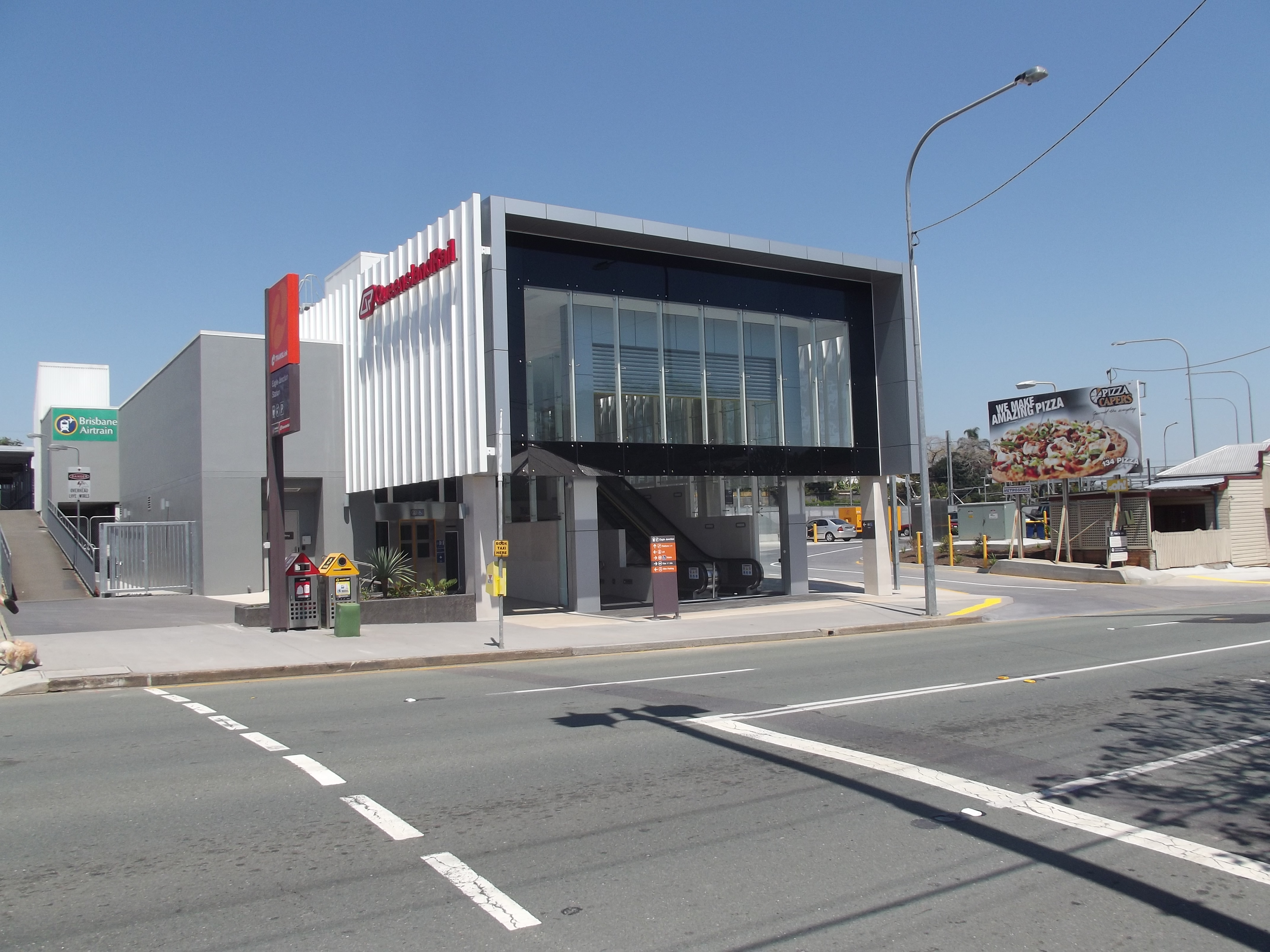
- Photo of the Eagle Junction railway station

- Coordinates: 27.4167°S 153.0500°E
- Country: Australia
- State: Queensland
- City: Brisbane
- LGA: City of Brisbane
- Location: 7.5 km (4.7 mi) NNE of Brisbane CBD

Government
  - State electorate: Clayfield
  - Federal division: Brisbane
- Postcode: 4011
Suburbs around Eagle Junction
| Wooloowin | Clayfield | Clayfield |
| Wooloowin | Eagle Junction | Clayfield |
| Wooloowin | Clayfield | Clayfield |

Eagle Junction is a former suburb of Brisbane, Queensland, Australia. It is now a neighbourhood within the suburb of Clayfield.

== History ==
The neighbourhood takes its name from the Eagle Junction railway station. The station was originally named Eagle Farm Junction, but the name was changed to just Eagle Junction in January 1888. The original name reflects that this station was the junction at which the railway line to Eagle Farm railway station split off.

== Education ==
=== Schools ===
Eagle Junction State School is a primary school which is located in Eagle Junction.

== Transport ==
=== Train ===
Eagle Junction railway station provides regular Queensland Rail City network services to Brisbane CBD, Brisbane Airport, Shorncliffe, Doomben and Caboolture.

=== Bus ===
Inbound
Route 320 – Chermside, Wavell Heights, Eagle Junction, Bowen Hills, City

Outbound
Route 320 – City, Bowen Hills, Eagle Junction, Wavell Heights, Chermside

East
Route 303 – Toombul, Ascot, Eagle Farm, Pinkenba

Route 369 – Mitchelton, Stafford City, Kedron Brook, Aviation High, DFO

West
Route 303 – Pinkenba, Eagle Farm, Ascot, Toombul
Route 369 – DFO, Aviation High, Kedron Brook, Stafford City, Mitchelton

=== Road ===
Eagle Junction is connected by State Route 20, which runs from Wooloowin to Hendra.
