= Hendra railway station =

Railway station in Queensland, Australia

Hendra
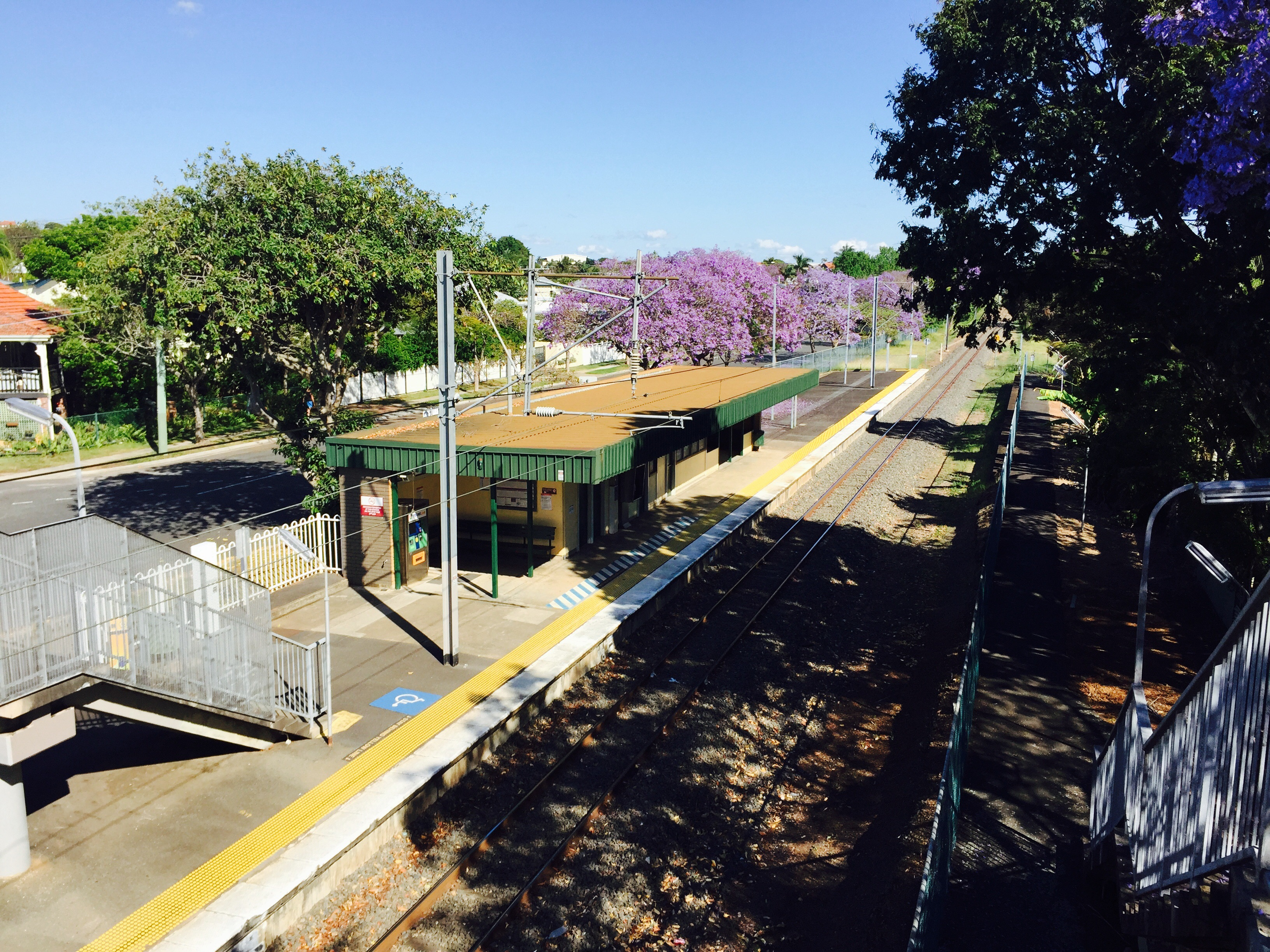
- Hendra station in October 2014

General information
- Location: Chermside Street, Hendra
- Coordinates: 27°25′19″S 153°03′45″E
- Owner: Queensland Rail
- Operator: Queensland Rail
- Line: T3 Doomben
- Distance: 8.00 kilometres from Central
- Platforms: 1
- Tracks: 1

Construction
- Structure type: Ground
- Cycle facilities: Yes
- Accessible: Yes

Other information
- Status: Unstaffed
- Station code: 600432
- Fare zone: Zone 1
- Website: Queensland Rail

History
- Opened: 3 September 1882

Services
Preceding station	Queensland Rail	Following station
Clayfield towards Roma Street	Doomben line	Ascot towards Doomben
Location

Hendra is a railway station operated by Queensland Rail on the Doomben line. It opened in 1882 and serves the Brisbane suburb of Hendra. It is a ground level station, featuring one island platform with one face.

== History ==
Hendra station opened on 3 September 1882 coinciding with that of the Pinkenba railway line. The line was electrified on 6 February 1988. All passenger services on the line were suspended on 27 September 1993 as part of a statewide rationalisation of the rail network with the closing or suspending of under-utilised or unprofitable rail lines. Only on days of major race events at nearby Eagle Farm and Doomben race tracks did few special services run on the line, and only to adjoining stations of Ascot and Doomben.

Passenger services resumed on 27 January 1998, but only as far as Doomben with bus connections to the other abandoned stations.

== Services ==
Hendra station is served by all stops Doomben line services from Doomben to Roma Street, Boggo Road (formerly Park Road) and Cleveland.

== Platforms and services ==
Hendra platform arrangement
Platform	Line	Destination	Notes
1	Doomben	Roma Street, Doomben	
