= Eagle Farm Racecourse and Ascot railway station =

Eagle Farm Racecourse and Ascot Railway Station
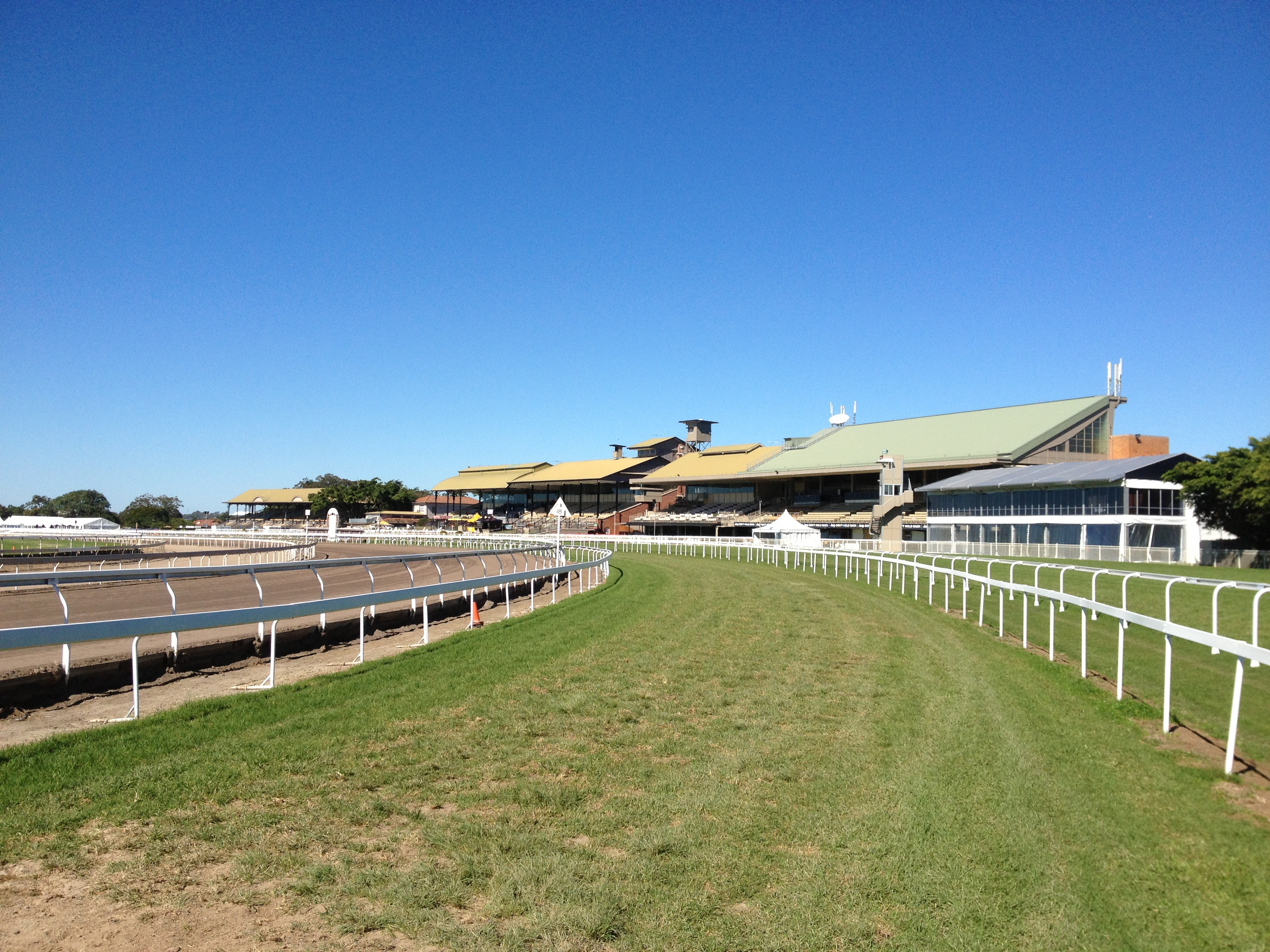
- Eagle Farm Racecourse, 2013

- Location within Queensland
- 27.4271°S 153.0675°E
- Location: 230 Lancaster Road, Ascot, City of Brisbane, Queensland, Australia

History
- Built: 1863 onwards

Queensland Heritage Register
- Official name: Eagle Farm Racecourse and Ascot Railway Station, Ascot Racecourse, Brisbane Racecourse, Racecourse Railway Station
- Type: state heritage (built)
- Designated: 25 June 2004
- Reference no.: 602195
- Significant period: 1882–1958 (fabric); 1863–ongoing (social); 1865, 1882, 1885, 1912, 1941–1946 (historical)
- Significant components: stables, totalisator, bridge – foot/pedestrian, toilet block/earth closet/water closet, residential accommodation – housing, trees/plantings, garden – ornamental/flower, grandstand, bandstand/rotunda, railway siding, wall/s – retaining, greenhouse, refreshment booth, tree groups – avenue of, gate – entrance, tunnel – pedestrian, office/administration building, railway station, signal box/signal cabin/switch house/mechanical points (rail), ticket box/office

Eagle Farm Racecourse and Ascot Railway station is a heritage-listed pair of racecourse and railway station at 230 Lancaster Road, Ascot, City of Brisbane, Queensland, Australia. It was built from 1863 onwards. The racecourse is also known as Ascot Racecourse and Brisbane Racecourse, and Ascot railway station was previously known as Racecourse railway station. It was added to the Queensland Heritage Register on 25 June 2004.

== History ==
The Eagle Farm Racecourse was established in 1863 and continues to operate as one of Queensland's premier racecourses. Additions and extensions include the establishment of the Pinkenba railway line (1882), the Paddock Stand (1889), the St Leger Stand (1913 with extensions in 1938), the Totalisator Building (1913 with extensions in the 1920s and 1950s), the entrance gates (1913), ticket boxes (1914), the Members' Stand (1925) and the John Power Stand (1958), as well as a number of other timber and brick buildings and timber stabling areas. The Ascot railway station opened in September 1882 to bring race-goers to the Eagle Farm Racecourse.

Horse racing was one of the earliest sports practiced in Queensland following the opening of the Moreton Bay district in 1842. Organised by the Moreton Bay Racing Club, the first recorded horse races in Brisbane were held at Coopers Plains on 17 July 1843. A racecourse at New Farm had been established by May 1846, when the first races were held there during that year and operated until the early 1860s.

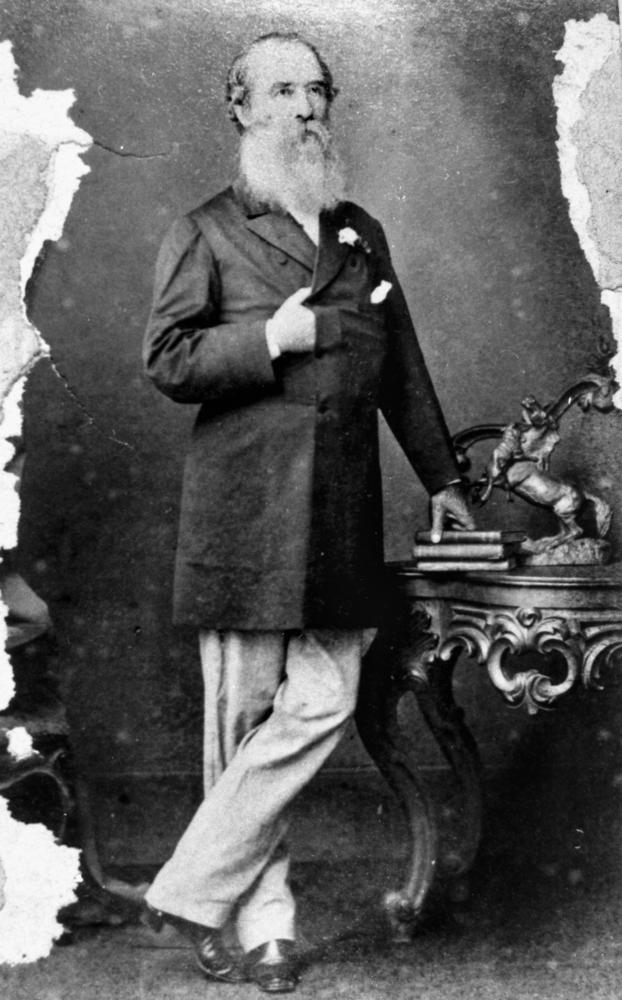
Maurice Charles O'Connell, 1860

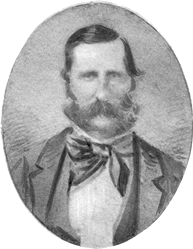
John Frederick McDougall, 1885

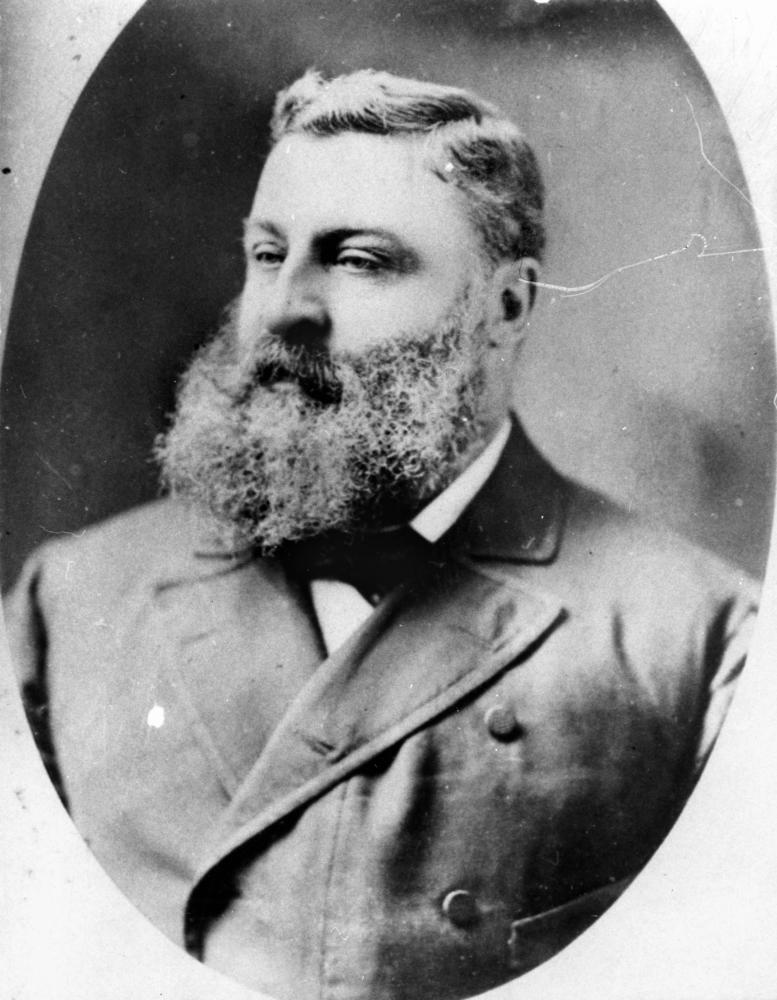
George Harris, circa 1870

The establishment of the Eagle Farm Racecourse in 1863 signaled the demise of the course at New Farm. A grant of 320 acres (130 ha) was approved with the site being named the "Brisbane Racecourse". The Deed of Grant for the racecourse land, signed by Governor Bowen on 12 October 1863, stipulated that "the appropriation thereof [was] as a racecourse and for no other purpose whatsoever". It was placed under the trusteeship of Maurice Charles O'Connell MLC, John Frederick McDougall MLC and George Harris MLC, members of the Queensland Turf Club. A grandstand capable of seating 350 people was erected and a saddling paddock was constructed before the first three-day meeting at the Eagle Farm Racecourse took place on 14 August 1865. Attended by about 2000 people, the races took place in a thickly forested area, and race-goers could catch only occasional glimpses of the horses. The first Chairman was Colonel MC O'Connell who served the club in this capacity until 1875. At the time of his appointment, O'Connell was president of the Queensland Legislative Council, a position he held from 1860–1879.

The Queensland Turf Club (QTC) assumed a leadership role in the state's racing industry, which was formalized by the Brisbane Racecourse Act 1875 coming into force. It empowered the Trustees to deal with the land covered by the 1863 Deed of Grant and initiated sale of parts of it to the north of the present-day race track, starting in 1876 and continuing into the 1880s.

Despite the early establishment of the QTC, horse racing in Queensland did not become popular on a larger scale until the 1880s. Throughout the 1870s and 1880s, the club divested itself of some of its land in order to pay off the considerable mortgage which earlier borrowing had necessitated.

The racecourse was also used for other sporting purposes with cricket matches during the 1870s as well as polo matches from 1877 to c. 1900. On 15 August 1883 the venue hosted the first rugby union game in Brisbane between Queensland (now Reds) and NSW (now Waratahs), which was also historically significant as the first match anywhere in the world where the referee used a whistle.

By the end of the 1880s, however, the boom in racing had resulted in an increase in the number of meetings. A new code of rules (1885) modelled on those of the English Jockey Club was adopted and a system of registration of all racing clubs under the QTC rules was instituted. The club thereby constituted itself the supreme racing authority in the colony and the ultimate court of appeal. Another significant step undertaken during the 1880s was the publication of the first edition of The Queensland Racing Calendar in 1886.

A boom in racing at the end of the 1880s led to a mushrooming of clubs and meetings. The senior club was the QTC, which staged four 2–3 day meetings per year at Eagle Farm Racecourse, coinciding with the main public holidays: Christmas, New Year's Day, the Queen's Birthday, the Brisbane Exhibition and the Prince of Wales's birthday. With several clubs and courses in operation in Brisbane, meetings often clashed; consequently, in May 1890 the leading racing clubs agreed to empower the QTC to allot dates for meetings, thereby confirming it as the premier club. The second major metropolitan club was the Tattersall's Club, which did not have its own track but preferred to rent the Eagle Farm course for £300 per year for its two meetings, in autumn and near the end of the year. The Tattersall's Club held its first meeting at the Eagle Farm Racecourse on 10 December 1884.

In the early years, race-goers drove in their buggies or rode their horses to the track. Others were reported as arriving by a small steamer known as the "shuttlecock boat". A major achievement for the Queensland Turf Club was the opening of the Brisbane and South East Railway Line extension from Eagle Junction to Ascot on 3 September 1882. Unlike Melbourne and Sydney, Brisbane was too small to have railways built just to serve its suburbs; however, some of its lines, such as the seaside lines to Sandgate and the branch to Eagle Farm Racecourse, were built solely to benefit Brisbane residents.

While horseracing was controlled and patronised by the elite, large numbers of people from all strata regularly attended race meetings. The spatial organisation of the Eagle Farm Racecourse reflected class hierarchies. All non-members paid to enter the racecourse and once inside, patrons, if they wished to pay more, were separated according to the additional price for certain areas. Entrance to the St Leger Stand cost less than the entrance to the Paddock Stand and saddling area, while members were located in their own stand. The area where the totalisator (introduced 1879) was located was one space that was less defined where punters of all classes placed bets. Working-class people tended to gather in the "outer", an area in the middle of the racetrack. This space was especially popular during major race programmes, with all manner of entertainment including boxing tents, sideshows and drinking booths, competing with the bookies stands in operation.

A riot at the Spring Meeting on 12 November 1887 highlighted these divisions. During the Sandgate Handicap, clear favourite (and heavily backed Touchstone) was beaten by Honest Ned, due to a controversial start. The QTC decision to judge the race legitimate led to an outraged crowd from the outer occupying or surrounding a range of spaces including the grandstand, stewards' room, saddling paddock, judges stand and QTC committee enclosure. While minor fighting occurred and nine rioters had charges brought against them, the transgression of these elite spaces occurred in a fairly peaceful manner.

This incident resulted from a series of false starts before the disputed final race start. At this time horses raced at the drop of a flag. By the turn of the century a rope barrier was introduced. Barrier stalls were used shortly afterwards, however, it was not until 1959 that mobile gates were introduced.

On 21 September 1889 tenders were called by Hunter and Corrie and JH Buckeridge, as joint architects, for the construction of a grandstand, as well as stables and sheds. The grandstand, constructed in the Paddock area, became known as the Paddock Stand after it opened in 1890.

The depression in 1893 severely affected racing. Attendances dropped considerably and the prize monies offered fell from 3,455 sovereigns in 1890 to 1,615 sovereigns in 1894 for the Queen's Birthday meeting. All the main clubs found themselves in financial difficulties. Consequently, a decision to extend the track from 8 furlongs (one and a half kilometres) to 10 furlongs (two kilometres), was reversed, and the extension was not made until 1901.

The railway enabled access by a larger racing public, although the competition of cheap weekend rail returns to Sandgate (then Brisbane's most popular beach) lessened the anticipated numbers. By 1885, a fork siding for turning around the rail engines had been laid adjacent to the grounds, in what is now the members' car park at the corner of Lancaster and Kitchener roads. In 1897 the name of the railway station was changed from Racecourse to Ascot (after the famous Ascot Racecourse in England), and in the same year the line was extended to Pinkenba. The timber station was built in 1898. The advent of the electric tram along Racecourse Road from 1899 also provided an alternative means of transport for patrons.

The early twentieth century brought with it further improvements to the grounds and facilities. Over a period of 29 years, from the late 1880s, conferences between the major racing clubs of Australia were held to reach agreement on uniform rules of racing. On 14 October 1912, Queensland agreed to and accepted the final draft of the Australian Rules of Racing. From that time, the club progressed. In January 1913, GHM Addison, architect, placed a tender notice for the construction of a totalisator building (also known as the Tote Building). Also in January 1913, Hall and Dods, architects, placed a tender notice for the construction of a new St Leger Stand at Ascot Racecourse. Tenders for the construction of entrance gates to the Eagle Farm Racecourse were called on 11 January 1913. Designed by architects Chambers and Powell, the gates were constructed by A Gillespie at a cost of £1120. Later, on 6 February 1914, Addison called for tenders for the construction of latrines at the racecourse, which were constructed by Manuel Hornibrook at a cost of £1335. GHM Addison was also the architect for the ticket boxes at Eagle Farm Racecourse. Tenders were called on 10 April 1914 and accepted on 17 April 1914. The successful tenderer was James Malskrey and the cost of the ticket boxes was £915. On 17 March 1916, W Lindsay's tender of £151/5/0 was accepted for the construction of a bandstand at Eagle Farm Racecourse; the architects were Atkinson and McLay.

Railway facilities at the Eagle Farm Racecourse were also improved at this period. A railway overbridge adjacent to the Ascot Railway station was completed in October 1911, and in 1912 a new siding was constructed at the Hendra end of the platform, to store trains on race days. At this time the 1880s fork siding was removed. Following lobbying from the Hamilton Town Council, a second railway station was constructed on the western side of the line in 1913–14, opening on 20 February 1914. This was a pre-cast concrete building with a terracotta tile roof, and is now the earliest surviving pre-cast concrete railway station still in operation. Earlier (now demolished) examples were Northgate (1911–12) and Chelmer (1913), while Kuranda (after September 1914) is the next oldest surviving.

Congestion on race days at the racecourse station resulted in several further changes in the first decades of the twentieth century. The QTC had found that the level crossing gates, inserted when the rail line was extended to Pinkenba, obstructed access to the course. In 1914 the club agreed to pay the cost of building a subway underneath the railway embankment. Wartime delays hindered its completion until April 1916. In 1920, plans were devised to duplicate the railway line to cater for the ever-increasing number of patrons, but this did not come to fruition.

In 1924–25 a new Members' Stand was constructed, designed by Hall and Prentice, the architects responsible for the design of Brisbane City Hall. Later additions by Hall and Prentice included alterations to the main and "flat" totalisators as well as a new lavatory block in April 1923. In June 1938, tenders for extensions to the St Leger Stand were closed. The architects were Hall and Cook.

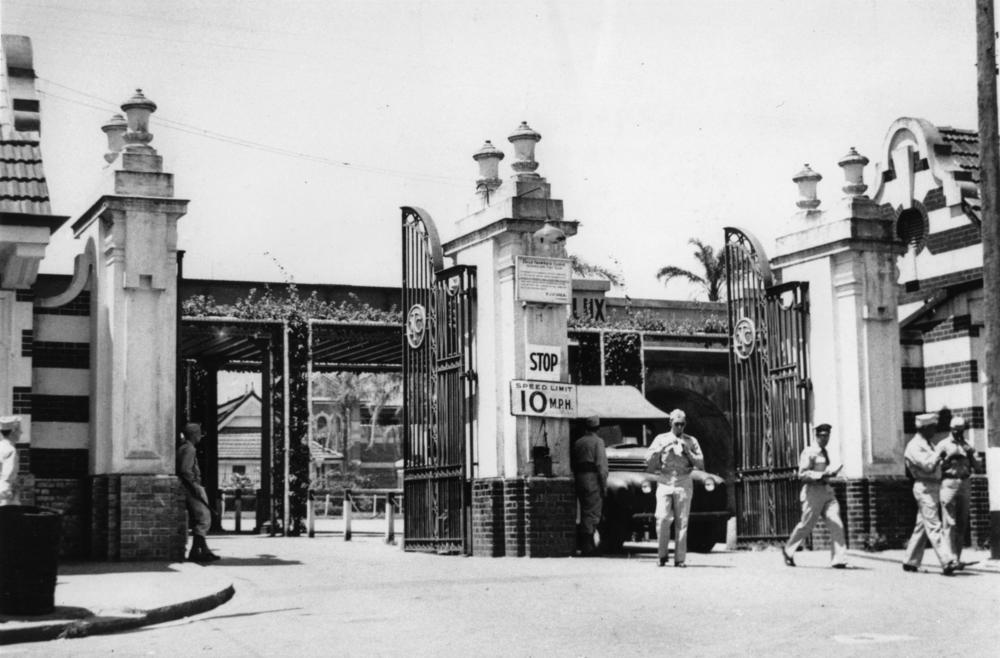
American servicemen at the gates of Eagle Farm Racecourse, circa 1942

During World War II, the club's regular race meetings continued until December 1941 when Australia faced the threat of invasion by Japan. Military authorities took over the racecourse on 19 December 1941. Until 1946, Eagle Farm Racecourse was known as Camp Ascot, occupied by thousands of Americans. The first contingents of American servicemen from the Pensacola Convoy marched from Bretts Wharves down Racecourse Road and through what has since been termed "The Gateway to Victory" in December 1941. In the early 1940s, eight "igloo" stores were erected at Eagle Farm Racecourse for the Australian and United States Armies. Throughout World War II, the QTC conducted races at Albion Park, the Victory Cup Meeting in May 1946 marking the return of racing to the Eagle Farm Racecourse.

In the 1950s the totalisator building which straddled the Paddock/St Leger boundary was extended and the John Power Stand, designed by architect Martin Conrad, was built in 1958 by KD Morris & Sons, Pty Ltd, at a cost of £450,000. It was named after Dr John Power, the President of the QTC from 1947 to 1965. Conrad designed a number of other buildings at the racecourse in following years, including the Judge's Box (1963), and a ladies toilet (1966).

The club celebrated its centenary with a carnival on 8–15 June 1963. By then Eagle Farm Racecourse was one of the premier racecourses in Australia.

Racecourse developments since 1963 have taken several forms. In 1969 a new kikuyu grass training track, aluminium running rails, horses' swimming pool, state-of-the-art testing facilities for the Laboratory, covered betting ring and opening of the famous Guineas Room – a restaurant situated on the second level of the Members' Stand (John Power Stand) – were added. In 1990 there was major track extension between the 1,600-metre (5,200 ft) and the 1,200-metre (3,900 ft) and the QTC acquired several properties bordering the 1,600-metre (5,200 ft) up to the 1,400-metre (4,600 ft) starts. The new 1,600-metre (5,200 ft) start was used for the first time in February 1991. Restoration of the old Totalisater building in 2006 and relocation of the Racing Museum there took place some time afterwards. Prolonged drought led to the existing dam being expanded, a new dam excavated and a fence and underground water tanks installed in 2008. There was upgrading of Eagle Farm in 2005 with work undertaken to the St Leger Stand and lawns and setting up of the Champagne Bar facing the mounting yard as a temporary measure until permission was granted for the permanent addition in 2006.

The QTC, recognizing the "important heritage value for Eagle Farm" and its "range of challenges as the ageing facilities require maintenance", commissioned Riddel Architecture to prepare a Conservation Management Plan for Eagle Farm racecourse. This was finalised in 2008.

Changes to the management of the Eagle Farm Racecourse have also taken place. At the QTC's AGM on 9 September 1997, the membership unanimously voted for incorporation to allow the Club to have freehold title of Eagle Farm racecourse in its own name as of 31 March 1998. Circa 2002 there was an in-principle agreement by the QTC Board to a joint venture to merge the QTC and the Brisbane Turf Club to form one entity. Merger of the QTC and Brisbane Turf Club (which managed Doomben Racecourse) to form the Brisbane Racing Club subsequently took place on 8 August 2008. This was regarded as a prudent business decision to ensure "a vibrant future for Eagle Farm and Doomben racecourses." On 1 July 2009 the new Brisbane Racing Club became operational.

One of the first objectives of the Board was the creation of the Master Plan to develop Eagle Farm and Doomben Racecourses to give Brisbane the finest racing facilities in Australia. A Master Plan was announced in April 2009 which proposed "world class racing facilities in a precinct which [would] have a variety of lifestyle, residential, retail and commercial developments". Track and facility enhancements were to include "infield stabling for 400 horses and a dedicated veterinary clinic at Eagle Farm." It also promised `extensive landscaping of the whole area... and 16.5 ha of open leisure space and parklands have been set aside for use by the community.' A further Conservation Management Plan has been prepared by Brannock & Associates in 2011 to inform development plans.

A published history of the QTC stated that "the development of the Brisbane Racing Precinct will give due respect to the historical significance of the area... maintaining, enhancing and showcasing the magnificent heritage of Eagle Farm".

The same publication recognized that the QTC has a "special position in Queensland history... and played a pivotal role in the early days of settlement". The book was commissioned "because it is imperative Queenslanders had a record of the role the Club played in the history of the state and the racing industry".

In 2012 the mounting yard and the race day tie-up stalls, previously located at the western end of the John Power (Members) Stand, were moved behind the public grandstand, where they had been positioned until 1946. Today, Eagle Farm Racecourse remains one of the premier racecourses in Australia.

Ascot railway station is the last station in metropolitan Brisbane to retain semaphore signalling and a mechanically interlocked signal cabin, and is one of only seven such systems intact in Queensland. In 2008 the seven mechanically interlocked signal cabins still commissioned were Ascot (not used), Charters Towers, Ingham, Innisfail, Kuranda, Laidley (rarely used) and Mackay. There are about 19 surviving decommissioned interlocked signal cabins complete with their frames in Queensland (six have been relocated), along with 36 signal cabins minus their signal frames, and 10 known signal frames in various states of intactness. Approximately 100 mechanically interlocked signal cabins have been demolished at stations around Queensland.

== Description ==
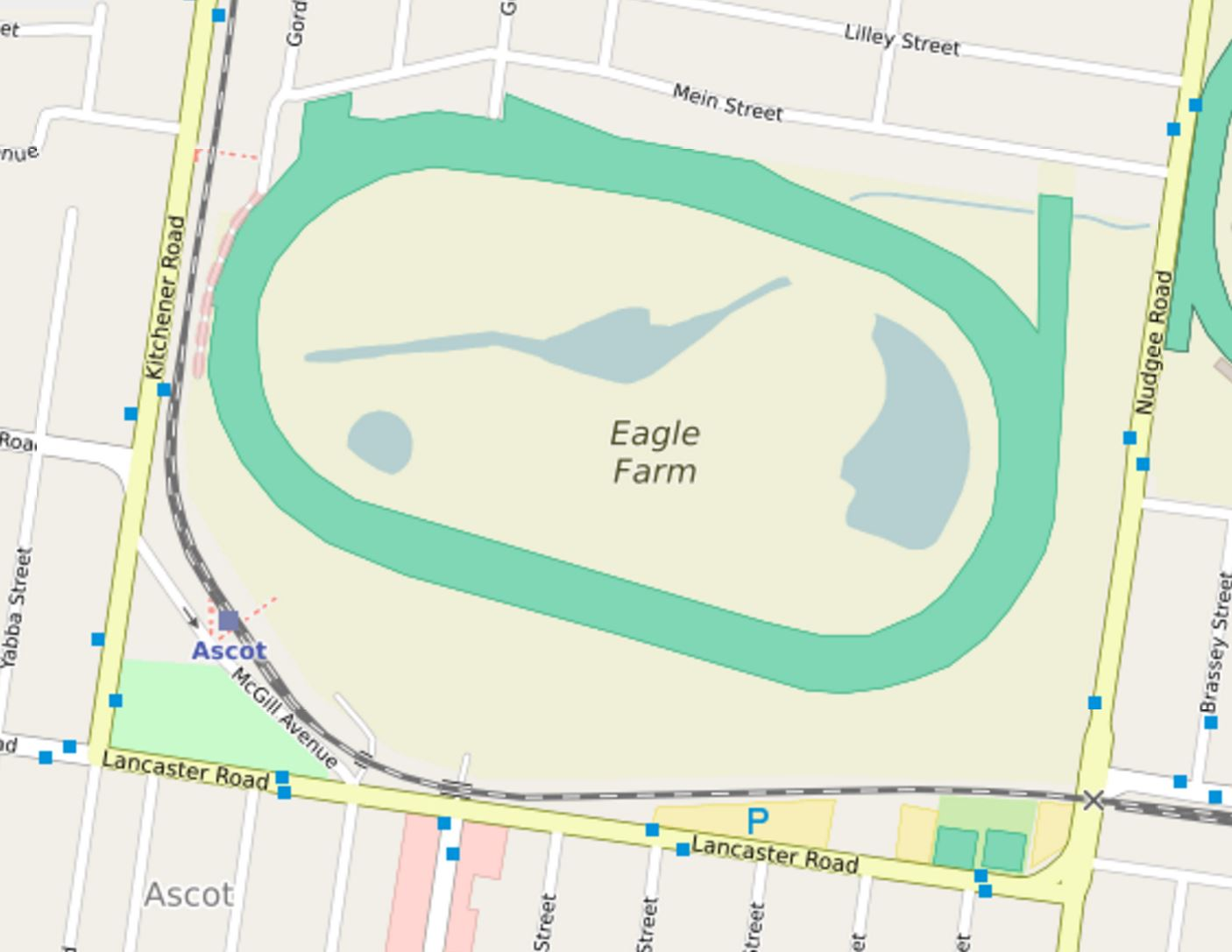
Map of the racecourse and railway station, 2016

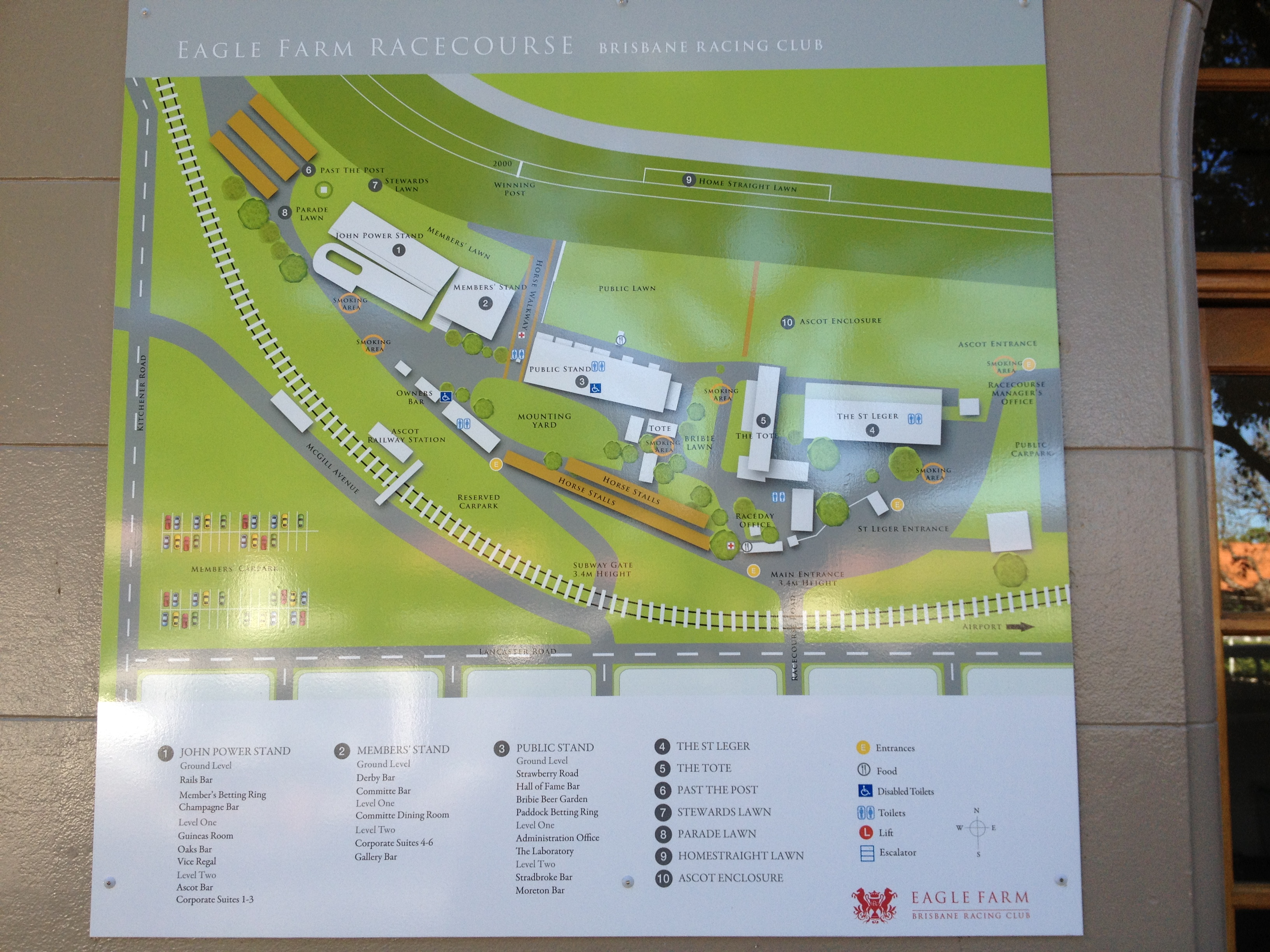
Plan of Eagle Farm Racecourse, 2013

Eagle Farm Racecourse occupies a large flat site in Ascot bounded by Lancaster and Nudgee roads to the south and east, the house lots along Mein and Gordon streets in the north and Kitchener Road in the west. The railway line passes along the southern and western boundaries with Ascot railway station located at the south-western corner of the site.

=== Ascot railway station ===
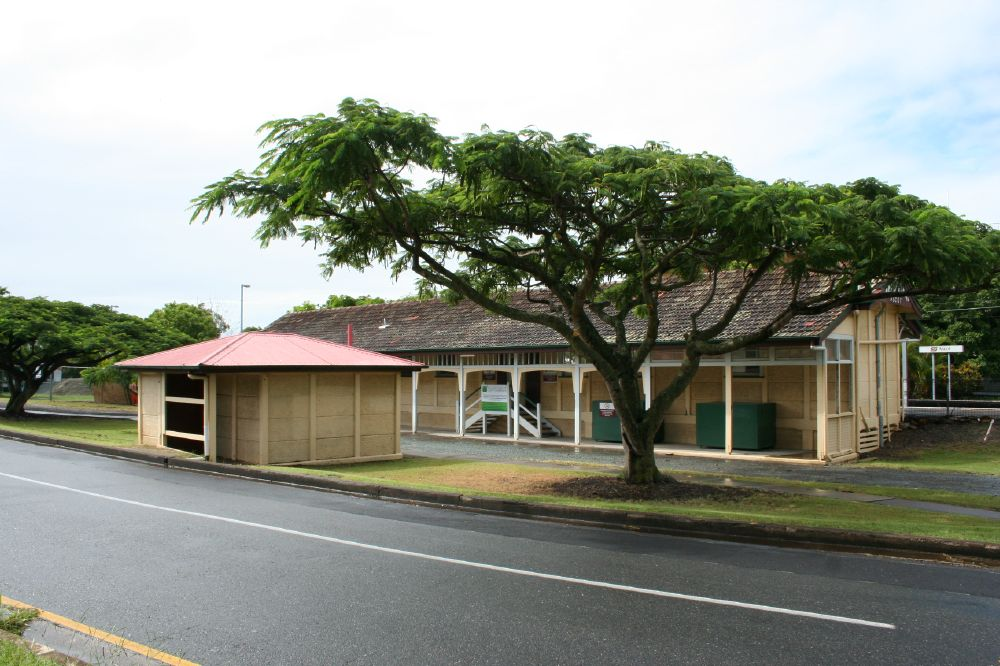
Ascot railway station, as seen from McGill Avenue, 2009

The station comprises two buildings, one on each side of the rail line. The 1880s station building, on the north-east side of the line, is a timber-framed and clad structure with sections of exposed framing, while the 1914 building, on the south-west side of the track, is of precast concrete with decorative timber lattice elements. Both buildings have terracotta tiled gable roofs with large overhangs. A timber pedestrian overbridge is located just south of the station buildings, connecting the course to McGill Avenue. There is another timber overbridge at the Hendra [northern] end of the site, where a laneway leads from Gordon Street to it, giving access to Kitchener Road.

=== Ticket offices and entrance gates ===
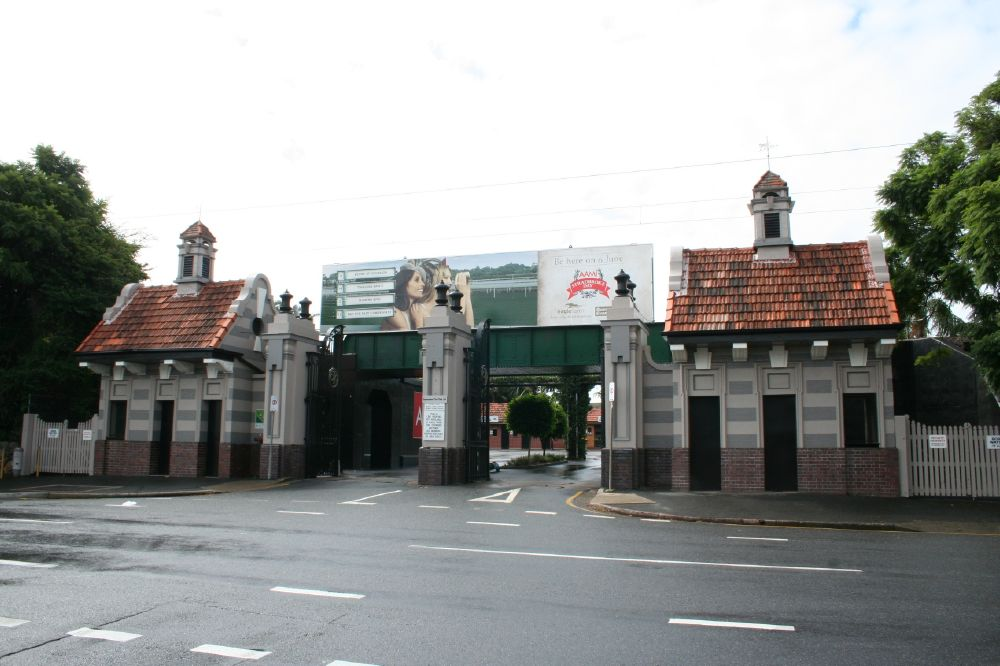
Entry ticket offices and gates on Lancaster Road, 2009

The public face of the racecourse is provided by the Federation style ticket offices and decorative wrought iron gates in Lancaster Road, terminating the view down Racecourse Road (1913). These structures consist of brick walls with an upper section (above sill height) of rendered bands above a face brick base and gabled terracotta tiled roofs with large eaves supported on corbels and central ridge ventilators. Either side of the ticket buildings are timber gates and beyond these are low level stone retaining walls extending approximately 70 metres (230 ft). The members' car park is located at the corner of Lancaster and Kitchener roads on a parcel of open grassed land which includes a number of mature trees.

Behind the Lancaster Road entry gates a subway leads under the railway line to ticket offices and turnstiles similarly constructed of brick with terracotta tiled roofs. A bitumen access road lined with well maintained gardens leads away from the main entry to the eastern end of the course.

=== Public racecourse area ===
The public racecourse area occupies the south-west corner of the site inside the rail line and comprises a series of grandstands and associated structures located to the south of the main straight. Whilst all structures exhibit differing levels of alterations and additions they are all reasonably intact. The race track itself occupies the majority of the remaining land to the north of this development, with stabling facilities to the west of the stands, and maintenance and management areas to the east. Further stabling and training facilities occupy the south-easternmost corner of the site on 5/RP33741.

=== St Leger spectator's stand ===
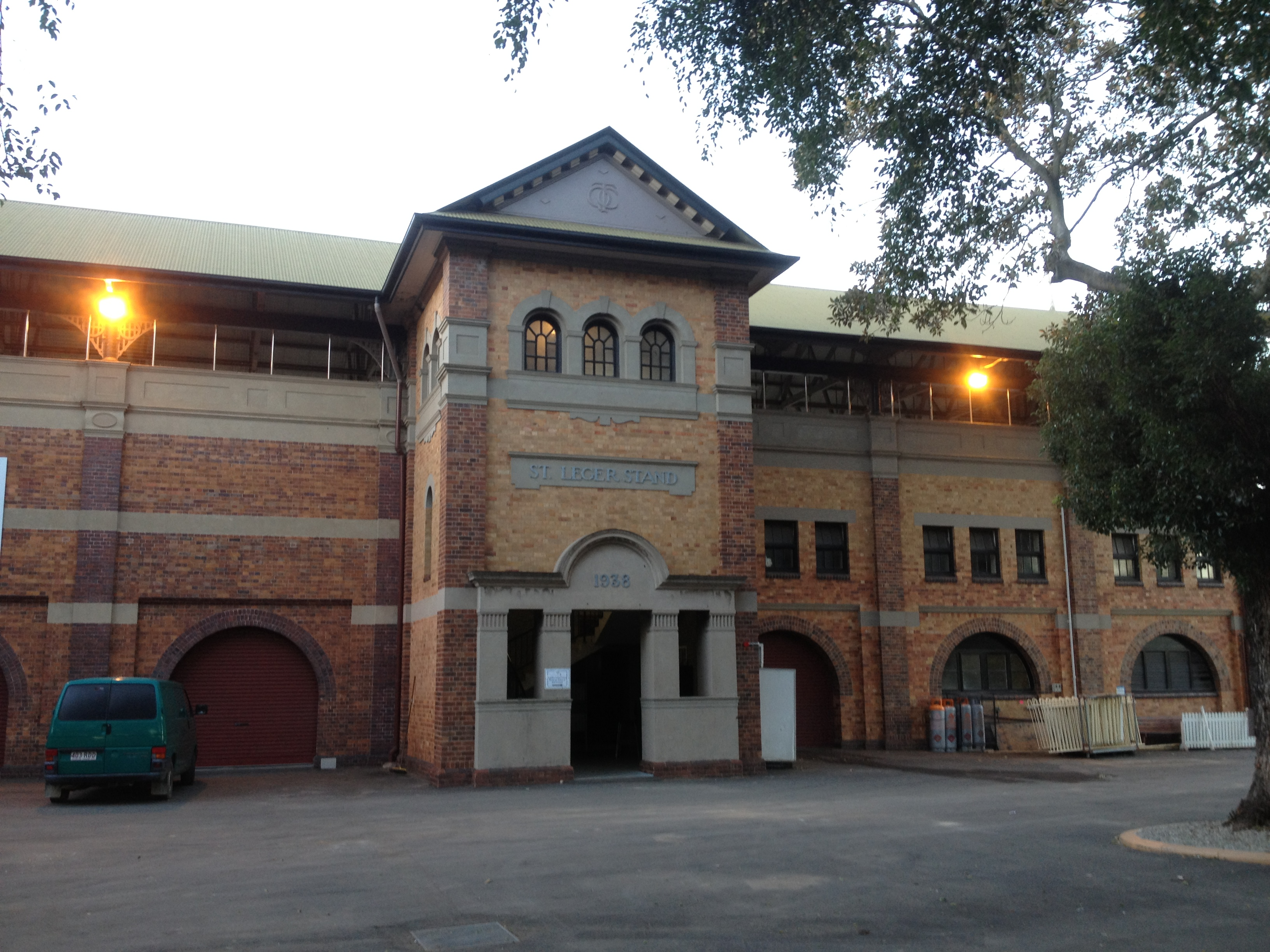
St Leger's grandstand, 2013

The most eastern spectator's stand is the St Leger (1913 with extensions in 1938). It comprises a face brick, towered component on the south and extensive tiered seating facing the track, with a gable roof supported on a composite cast iron and timber frame and clad in metal sheeting and ornate cast iron handrails. The stand sits on a brick base that houses toilets, refreshment rooms, and other facilities. An earlier ticket office is located to the south of the stand.

Constructed of brick with a terracotta tile roof, this structure still retains its original timber counter joinery. The southern informal forecourt contained between the ticket office and the stand is shaded by the canopies of a number of mature trees.

=== Totalisator Building and the Paddock Stand ===
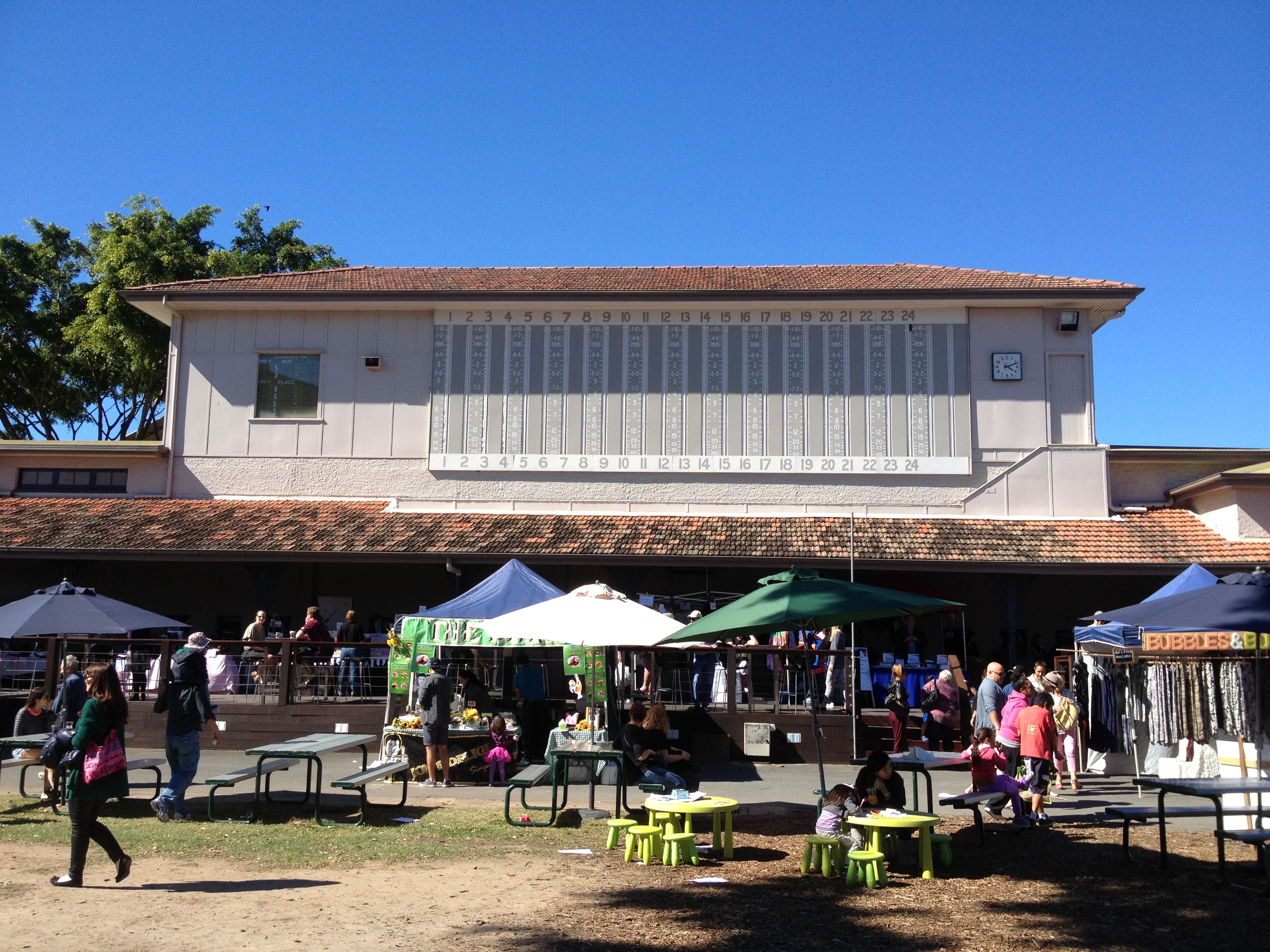
The Tote, 2013

To the west of the St Leger Stand are the Totalisator (or Tote) Building and the Paddock Stand. The Tote Building (1913, extended 1917) has a long, narrow plan running north to south between the stands, with an L-shaped extension on the southern end (1928). An additional part-storey, built for the Hodsdon's tote system in the 1950s, now houses the Julius Totalisator apparatus it replaced. The Paddock Stand is similar in construction to the St Leger Stand; however, it is characterised by a large galvanised iron vaulted roof with a gabled ridge ventilator that extends its entire length. It comprises ornate cast iron posts and handrails as well as decorative timber battening to the eastern end of the vaulted roof. The base of the stand accommodates a range of public and private spaces. This stand was extended to the west in the 1920s and the fabric and form of the addition are clearly discernible from the original structure.

=== Members' Stand and John Power Stand ===
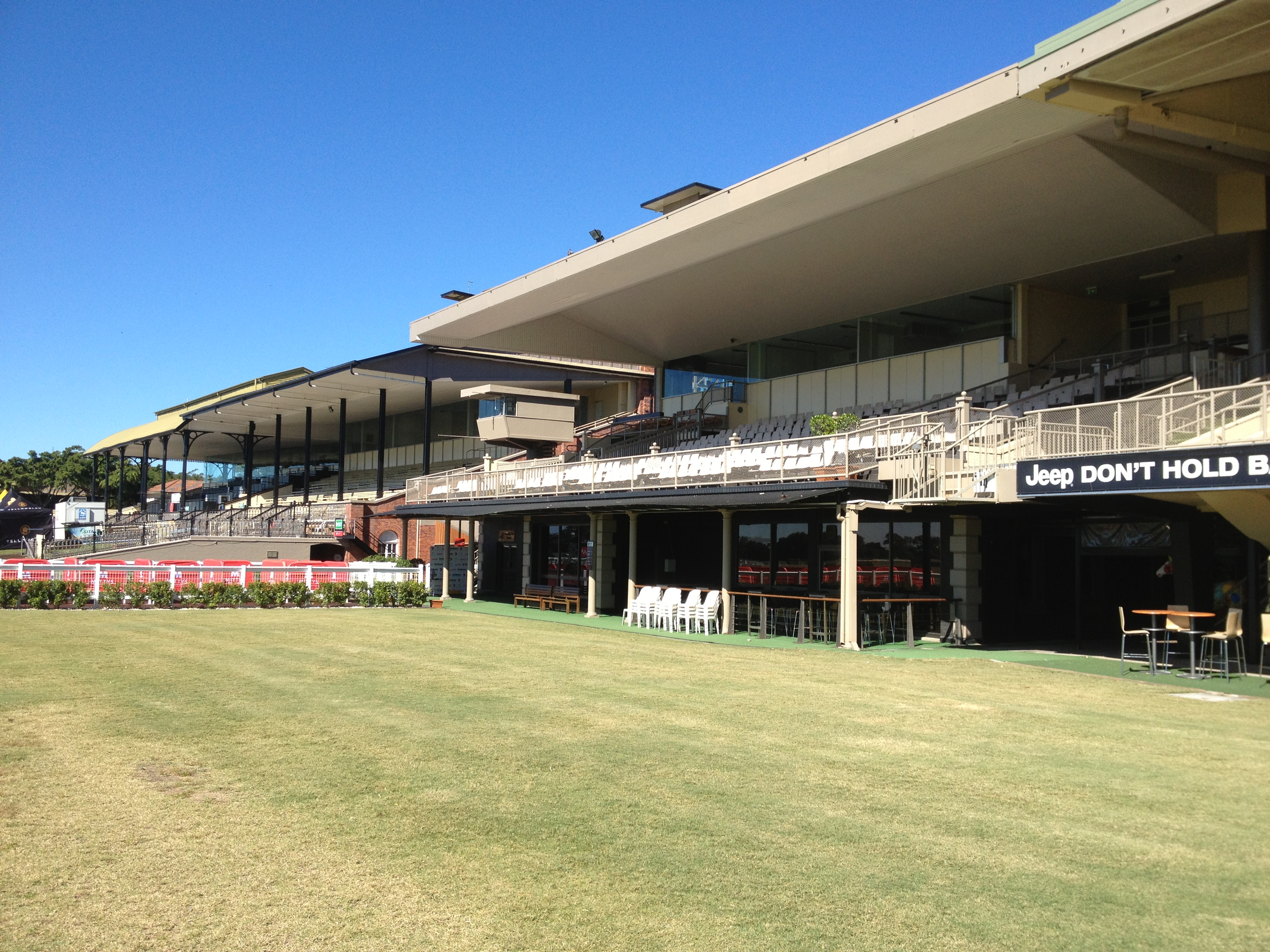
Members' Stand, 2013

Further to the west again is the 1925 three-storey rendered brick Members' Stand, attached to which is the Camera Tower. Nearby is the Judge's Box (1963). A range of original timber fittings and fixtures remains throughout this building. Adjoining the stand and connected by an upper level walkway is the 1950s John Power Stand. Both of these stands overlook the parade ring and saddling area. The John Power Stand is constructed primarily of reinforced concrete and its form and detail are typical of architecture of the period. Unlike the other stands the roof of the John Power Stand is also an open, cantilevered viewing area with tiered seating. The base of this building accommodates ticketing booths, a bar and refreshments area, public seating and open space for bookmakers.

=== Other structures ===
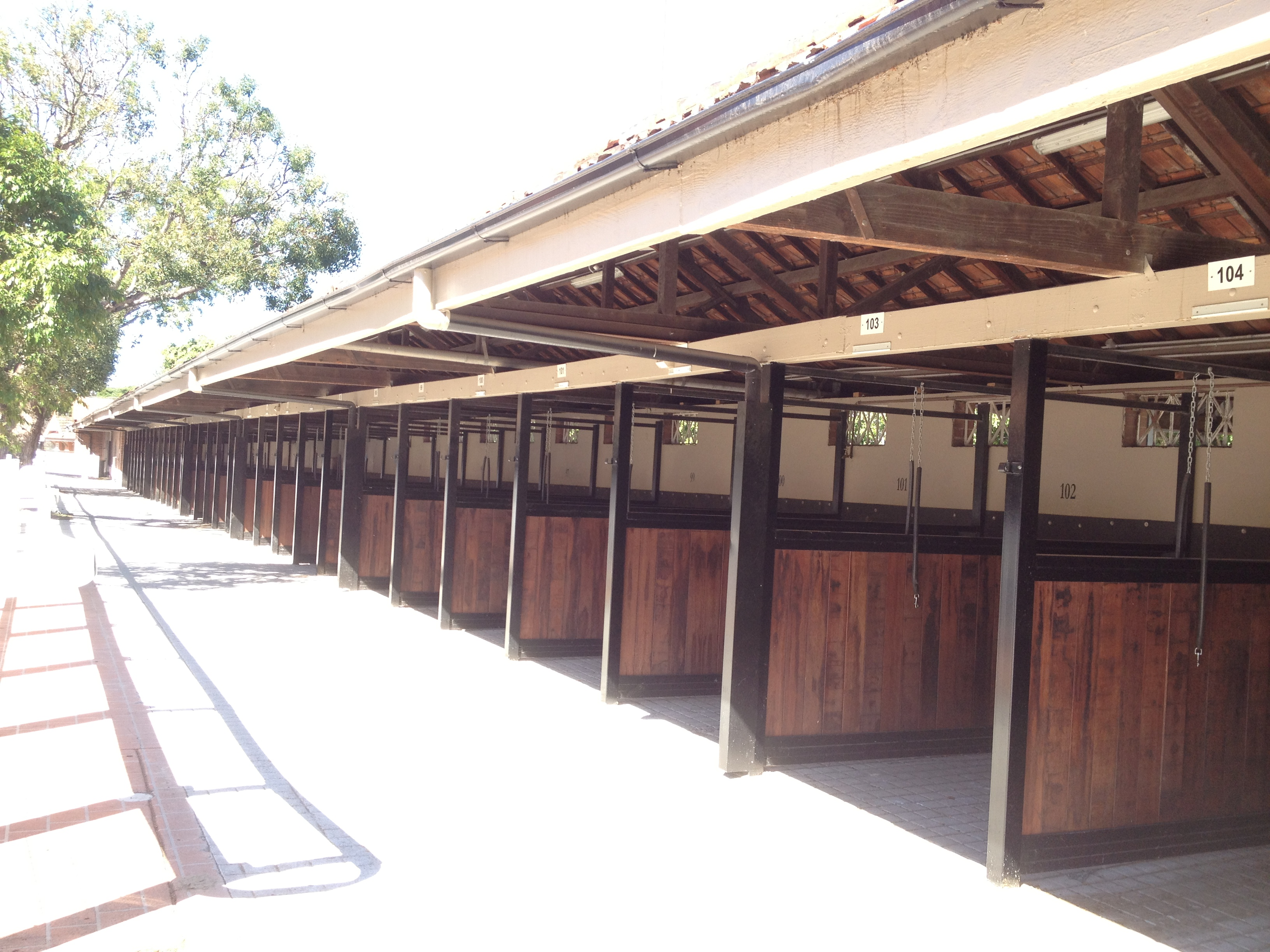
Stables, 2013

Located to the south of the Paddock, Members' and John Power Stands are a collection of single-storey buildings including ticketing booths, public toilets, refreshment stands, the former race-day stalls/stables and other facilities. They include brick structures with terracotta tile roofs to the south-west boundary of the public concourse as well as a collection of timber-framed and weatherboard-clad structures with galvanised iron roofs, sited between the brick structures and the stands. The ground surface surrounding these structures varies from bitumen, concrete, paving and lawn, and includes well maintained gardens where mature trees create a shade canopy to this entire area.

Located at the far western end of the site is a collection of five timber race day stalls and stables. Entry to this part of the site is via a secondary access from Gordon Street marked by two white rendered masonry pillars. Apart from this point of access there are a number of secondary entrances into the site from the roads bounding the course. The stable buildings are simple partially open timber structures with gable roofs. The external walls are generally clad with weatherboards on the ends, while the rear long walls are partially in-filled with battens. The stalls are formed with half-height timber-framed walls with timber boarding infill. The roofs are clad with corrugated asbestos cement sheeting. A number of brick, fibrous cement and corrugated iron-clad additions have been made throughout this complex. A concrete apron slab surrounds these structures.

The development to the east of the course beyond the St Leger Stand and between the track and the railway line includes a brick structure which houses the managers office (was turnstile building), an early timber residence (previously the caretaker's residence, damaged by fire in 2010 and demolished), a green house, car parking area and collection of timber-framed and clad maintenance buildings. The gardens that surrounded the residence are well maintained and terminate the gardens which bound the access road leading to this part of the site. Located in the south-east corner of the site is large stabling and exercise complex (stalls known as scraping stalls).

The grounds of the racecourse create a parkland setting and include well maintained gardens, specimen trees, avenues of trees, arched creeper trellises, flower beds (including seasonal bedding out schemes) and expanses of lawn.

== Heritage listing ==
Eagle Farm Racecourse and Ascot railway station was listed on the Queensland Heritage Register on 25 June 2004 having satisfied the following criteria.

The place is important in demonstrating the evolution or pattern of Queensland's history.

The Eagle Farm Racecourse and Ascot railway station (1863 and 1914 respectively) complex is important in demonstrating the development of horse racing since the 1860s into a major sport and industry in Queensland.

The provision of a suburban branch railway line and station to serve the racecourse from 1882 demonstrates the importance of racing from very early in Queensland's history.

Eagle Farm Racecourse is one of Queensland's earliest racing venues. Its evolution and development into the premier racing venue in Queensland is evidence of its importance to the state.

The place demonstrates rare, uncommon or endangered aspects of Queensland's cultural heritage.

Ascot railway station has rarity value as the last station in metropolitan Brisbane to retain semaphore signaling and a mechanically interlocked cabin, and is one of very few such systems left in Queensland, a form of signaling that was once common. Additionally, it is the earliest surviving pre-cast concrete railway station still in operation.

The place is important in demonstrating the principal characteristics of a particular class of cultural places.

The place is important as a good example of a large operating racecourse in a capital city, the principal elements of which include: track, stalls, scrapping yard, blacksmith, starting gates, fencing, grandstands and associated buildings and structures [including betting facilities], various structures associated with the calling and televising of races, and sheds and garages for grounds equipment.

The prestige of the Eagle Farm Racecourse as the premier racecourse of Queensland attracted a variety of architects to design for the Queensland Turf Club (QTC, Brisbane Racing Club since 2009), and the place is important in demonstrating the principal characteristics of the work of a number of prominent Queensland architects from different decades, including JH Buckeridge, Hunter and Corrie, Hall and Dods, GHM Addison, Chambers and Powell, Atkinson and McLay, Hall and Prentice, Hall and Cook, and Martin Conrad. The buildings designed and extended by the various architects include the well composed Paddock Stand which is characterised by a large galvanised iron vaulted roof with a gabled ridge ventilator. The stand comprises ornate cast iron posts and handrails as well as decorative timber battening. The St Leger Stand, is also a characteristic cast iron and timber building with a galvanised iron gable roof and ornate cast iron handrails.

The collection of early 20th-century structures and buildings including gates, ticket offices, St Leger Stand, railway station and other buildings and structures demonstrate the principal characteristics of Federation-style design: use of terracotta, decorative brick and timber work. It is an intact grouping of such buildings and structures in Queensland.

The 1898 timber railway station building is important in demonstrating the principal characteristics of its type, while the 1914 station building is an intact example of a pre-cast concrete structure which includes decorative timber lattice elements.

The place is important because of its aesthetic significance.

The Eagle Farm Racecourse and Ascot railway station complex is significant for its aesthetic values, including the spatial arrangement of buildings and structures around the track, the Victorian cast iron, brick and timber grandstands, Federation-style ticket offices, decorative wrought iron entrance gates, landscaped grounds, and the railway station buildings. The main entrance gates on Lancaster Road are a notable local landmark which contribute to the streetscapes of both this and Racecourse Road and are the highly visible public face of the Eagle Farm Racecourse.

The place has a strong or special association with a particular community or cultural group for social, cultural or spiritual reasons.

The Eagle Farm Racecourse is especially important for its strong social significance, including its association, over 130 years, with QTC members, officials, owners, trainers, jockeys and with generations of race-goers from all strata of Queensland, interstate and international society, who have attended the Eagle Farm races for social interaction, recreation and the enjoyment of this sport, so popular in Queensland. This association is reflected in the many changes that have occurred to the site, changes which demonstrate the continued relationship between the racecourse, the grandstands, (including later extensions and additions), and related structures, such as the totalisator building, the stabling areas and associated gardens and access ways and the entrance gates and ticketing offices, throughout the extensive grounds. These changes, including the inclusion of a special railway branch for race-goers and associated railway station, have contributed to making this racecourse a popular Queensland institution.

The place has a special association with the life or work of a particular person, group or organisation of importance in Queensland's history.

The Eagle Farm Racecourse and Ascot railway station has a special association with the QTC (Brisbane Racing Club from 1 July 2009). This organization has made an important contribution to the development of horse racing in Queensland, a major interest and industry since 1863. From early in the club's history it undertook a leadership role in the industry and in operating the Eagle Farm Racecourse as Queensland's premier racecourse.

== Bibliography ==
- Brisbane Courier. The Courier-Mail, 1863–1954
- Brannock & Associates, Eagle Farm Racecourse Conservation Management Plan. Brisbane: Prepared for Watpac BRC Pty Ltd, January 2014, Building 14. The building was added to in 1982 and 1984.
- Coughlan, Helen. Queensland Turf Club [QTC]: A Place in History, Boolarong: Brisbane, 2009.
- Doran, Bob. `The First Automatic Totaliser', The Rutherford Journal,@www.rutherfordjournal.org/article020109.html. accessed 30 May 2012.
- Jamison, Brian, `Racecourse Riot, 1887' in Raymond Evans, Carole Ferrier and Jeff Rickertt, eds, Radical Brisbane: an unruly history, The Vulgar Press, North Carlton, Vic, 2004.
- QHR 602627 Signals, Crane and Subway, Charters Towers Railway Station,
- QHR 600755 Cairns Railway, Section from Redlynch to Crooked Creek Bridge.
- Riddel Architecture, Eagle Farm Racecourse Conservation Management Plan. Brisbane Riddel Architecture, 2006.
- The Age, 10 Aug 1939.
- The Courier Mail "2012 Brisbane Racing Club Carnival" supplement
- "Totalisator history", http://members.ozemail.com.au/~bconlon/, .accessed 30 May 2012.
- Ward, Andrew and Peter Milner, Queensland Railway Heritage Places, Study: Stage 2, vol. 4, Dept Environment and Queensland Rail, Brisbane,1997.
