= Doomben line =

Passenger rail service in Queensland, Australia

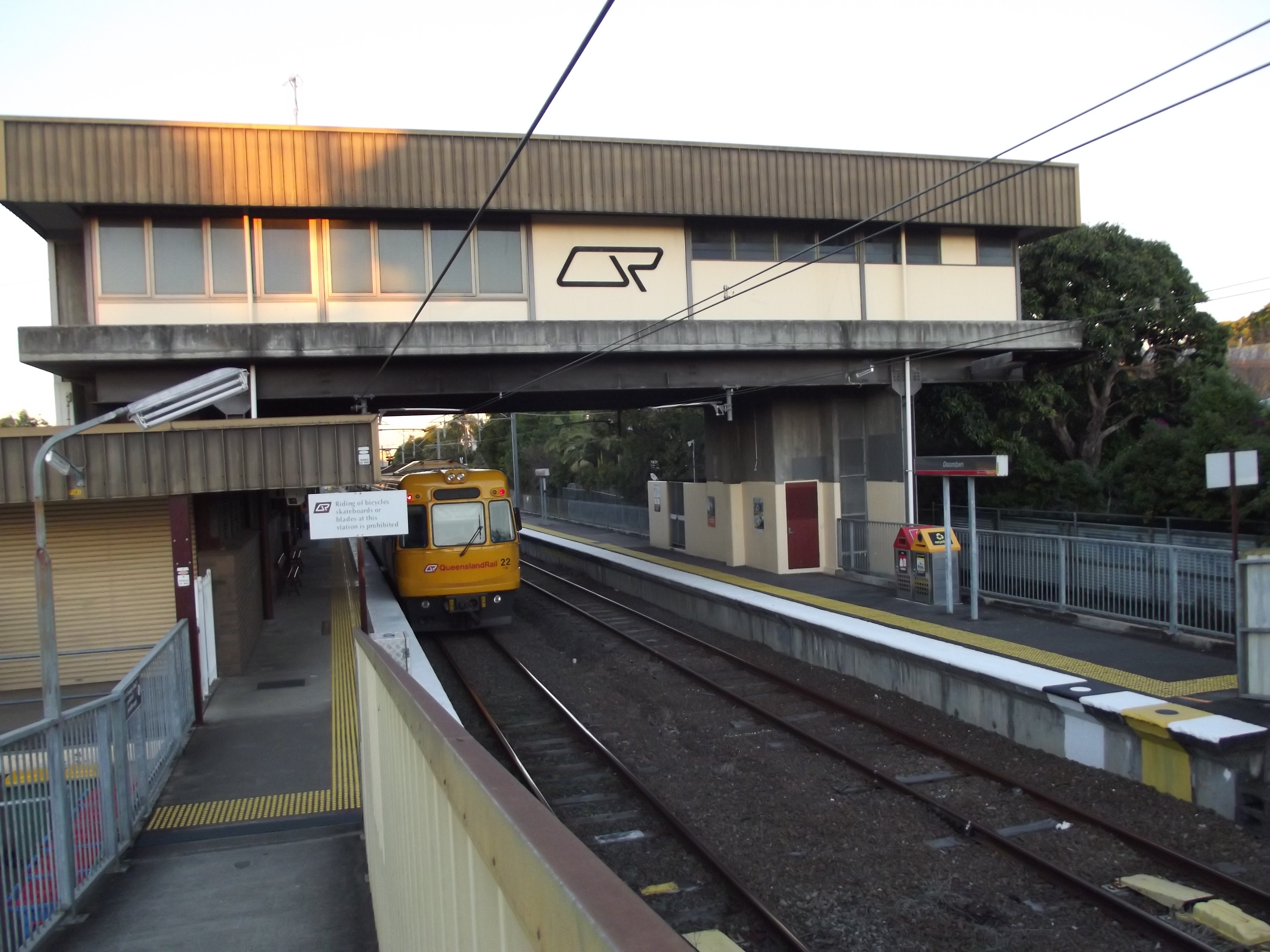
- EMU at Doomben station in June 2012

Overview
- Website: queenslandrail.com.au

Technical
- Track length: 8 km (5.0 mi)
- Number of tracks: Quadruple to Eagle Junction, remainder single track.
- Track gauge: 1,067 mm (3 ft 6 in)
- Electrification: 1988
- Operating speed: 60 km/h (37 mph)

The T3 Doomben line is a suburban commuter railway line in Brisbane, Queensland. Operated by Queensland Rail, the line runs for 10.7 kilometres (7 miles) from Doomben to Roma Street.

== History ==
On 3 September 1882, the first 2.4 kilometres (1.5 mi) section of the line was opened to Ascot (then named Racecourse) to serve the Eagle Farm racecourse, though nearby residents successfully lobbied for a regular passenger service. The line was extended 5.8 kilometres (3.6 mi) to Pinkenba in 1897, mainly to serve an industrial area, including wharves on the north side of the Brisbane River. The passenger service was timed to coincide with the starting and finishing times of the workers.

During World War I and World War II, with deep berthing available to ships at Pinkenba at the mouth of the Brisbane River, troops camped in the Pinkenba and Meeandah area. Passenger ships used the Pinkenba Wharf, and were served by special trains running from Brisbane to Pinkenba.

In the 1950s, earthworks were undertaken to allow the duplication of the line, hence the double-sided, island platform at Clayfield. The work included the regrading the line to eliminate the Sandgate Rd level crossing, but the duplication program was abandoned before the second track was laid.

The line was electrified in 1988, but only to Eagle Farm, the next station after current suburban terminus Doomben. For the next five years, services to Pinkenba were run as a shuttle to and from Eagle Farm, using 2000 class railmotors. All passenger services on the line were suspended in September 1993 as part of a state-wide rationalisation of the rail network, which included under-utilised or unprofitable rail lines being closed or having services suspended. Only a few special trains were run on the line on days when major race meetings were held at adjoining race tracks.

Electric passenger services resumed on 27 January 1998, but only as far as Doomben, with bus connections to the stations beyond there.

The Doomben to Pinkenba section is used only for freight. Queensland Rail occasionally runs special steam trains on the entire Pinkenba line as part of their semi-regular "Steam Train Sunday" excursion service. That is the only way people can travel over the full length of the line.

On 10 August 2026, the Doomben line was numbered T3 by Translink.

== Line guide and services ==
All services stop at all stations to Roma Street. Prior to 1 June 2025, passenger services didn't run on Sundays or public holidays, after which they operated hourly on weekends and public holidays.

Passengers for the Airport, Caboolture, Nambour and Gympie North, Redcliffe Peninsula and Shorncliffe lines change at Eagle Junction, those for the Ferny Grove line change at Bowen Hills, and those for all other lines change at Roma Street.

=== Stations ===
List of T3 Doomben line stations
T3 Doomben line
Station	Image	Suburb	Opened	Terrain	Connections	Time (Note: Travel time in minutes from Roma Street.)
Roma Street		Brisbane CBD	14 June 1875	Ground	Ipswich/Rosewood line Springfield line Cleveland line Gold Coast line Beenleigh line Brisbane Metro Bus transport in Queensland	0
Central		Brisbane CBD	18 August 1889	Built over	Redcliffe Peninsula line Shorncliffe line Airport line, Brisbane Ferny Grove line	2 (Note: Service dwells for 2 minutes.)
Fortitude Valley		Fortitude Valley	1 November 1890	Underground	Redcliffe Peninsula line Shorncliffe line Airport line, Brisbane Ferny Grove line	6
Bowen Hills		Bowen Hills	1973	Ground	Redcliffe Peninsula line Shorncliffe line Airport line, Brisbane Ferny Grove line	9
Albion		Albion	1882	Ground	Shorncliffe line Airport line, Brisbane	13
Wooloowin		Wooloowin	1882	Ground	Shorncliffe line Airport line, Brisbane	15
Eagle Junction		Clayfield	1882	Ground	Sunshine Coast line, Queensland Redcliffe Peninsula line Shorncliffe line Airport line, Brisbane	17
Clayfield		Clayfield	3 September 1882	Ground	none	20
Hendra		Hendra	3 September 1882	Ground	none	22
Ascot		Ascot	3 September 1882	Ground	none	24
Doomben		Ascot	1976	Ground	none	26
