= Ascot railway station =

Ascot railway station, or Ascot train station, may refer to:

- Ascot railway station (Berkshire), a railway station in Ascot, Berkshire, England
- Ascot railway station, Brisbane, a railway station in Ascot, Brisbane, Australia

== See also ==
- Ascott-under-Wychwood railway station, England
