= Service review =

A service review is a review of an organisation's services designed to identify potential service delivery improvements. A Service Review can be used to improve the organisation's efficiency and effectiveness, and assists in addressing financial sustainability. Local government is one of the largest providers of services for the community. Councils have progressively taken on greater responsibilities for delivering services as community expectations have grown and other levels of government have devolved various functions. By systematically reviewing its services, a council can redesign its mix of services, achieve efficiency gains and generate additional income.

== Options ==
- Changing outputs and levels of service
- Sharing services and resources
- Forming strategic relationships or joint ventures
- Rationalising and making better use of assets
- Outsourcing services or activities
- Internal operational changes e.g. processes, work practices & technology
- Adding or modifying user charges
