= Hendra, Queensland =

Hendra
- Suburb
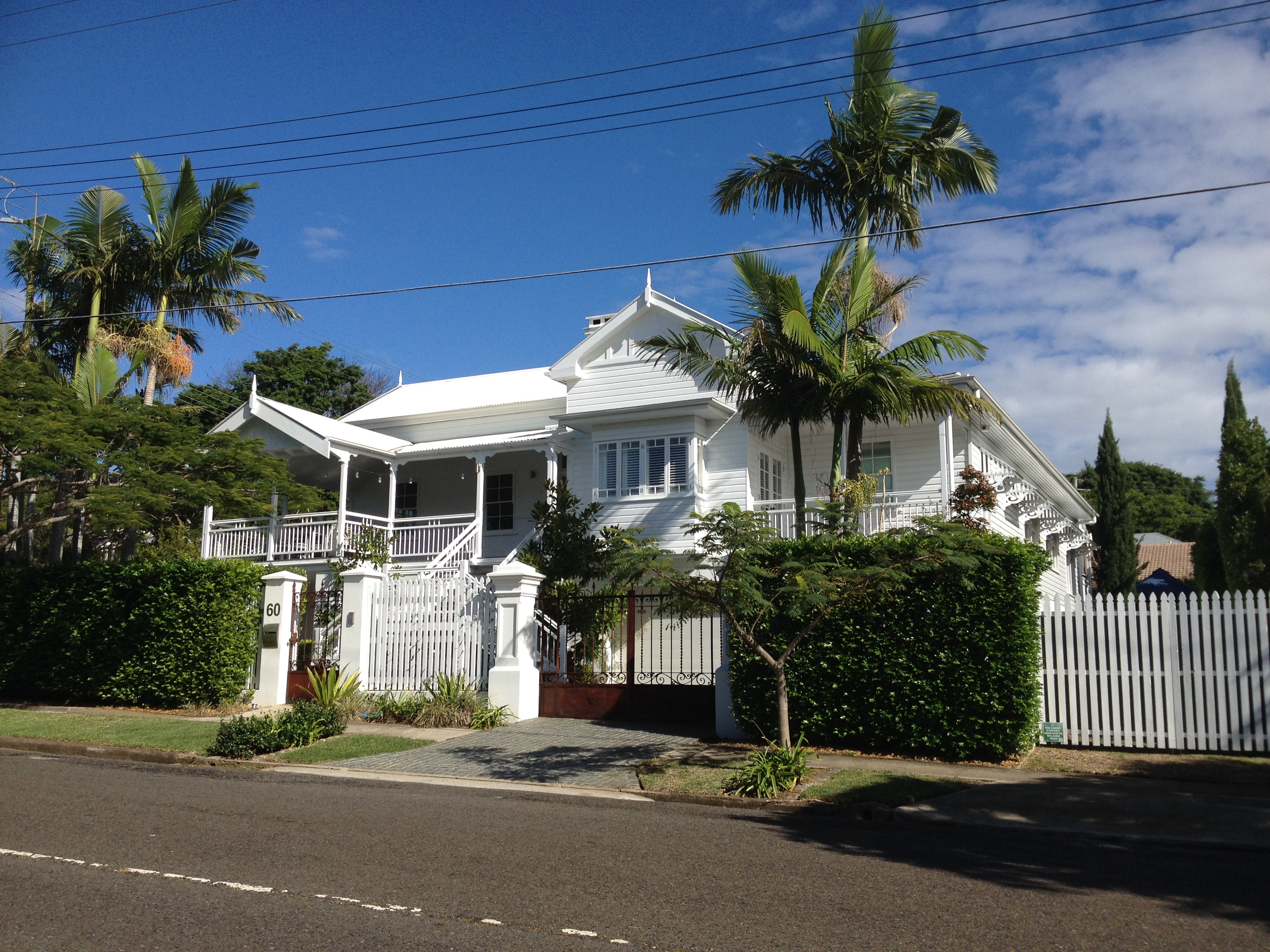
- Residential street in Hendra

- Interactive map of Hendra
- Coordinates: 27.4175°S 153.0697°E
- Country: Australia
- State: Queensland
- City: Brisbane
- LGA: City of Brisbane (Hamilton Ward)
- Location: 8.3 km (5.2 mi) NE of Brisbane CBD

Government
  - State electorate: Clayfield
  - Federal division: Brisbane

Area
  - Total: 2.6 km^{2} (1.0 sq mi)

Population
  - Total: 4,914 (2021 census)
  - Density: 1,890/km^{2} (4,900/sq mi)
- Time zone: UTC+10:00 (AEST)
- Postcode: 4011
Suburbs around Hendra
Nundah	Nundah	Hamilton
Clayfield	Hendra	Brisbane Airport
Clayfield	Ascot	Eagle Farm

Hendra is a suburb of the City of Brisbane, Queensland, Australia. In the 2021 census, Hendra had a population of 4,914 people.

== Geography ==
Hendra lies roughly six kilometres north-east of Brisbane central business district. The streets of Hendra are lined with Jacaranda and Royal poinciana Trees.

Hendra is roughly bounded by Schulz Canal and the Airport Link motorway to the north, and to the east by the Southern Cross Way and to the south by the Ascot racecourse and the Doomben racecourse.

The Doomben railway line enters the suburb from the south-west (Clayfield) and exits to the south (Ascot). The Hendra railway station services the suburb (27.4221°S 153.0626°E).

The land use is predominantly residential with an industrial precinct in the north-east of the suburb.

== History ==
The name Hendra is derived from the railway station name which was assigned 1882 probably given by Queensland Railway Commissioner Francis Curnow. Hendra is a traditional Cornish place name meaning an ancient or old hamlet or town.

Hendra was originally a farming district, an expansion of the Nundah settlement. The crops were citrus fruits, grapes and pineapples. There were also dairy herds.

Eagle Farm State School opened on 1 August 1864. In 1908 the school was renamed Hendra State School.

The Brisbane Courier advertised the "Grand drawing and distribution of land prizes" in January 1870. This portion of land had been part of land allocated to the Queensland Turf Club, tickets were advertised at £1 each. A plan for the subdivision notes its location within the Parish of Toombul and Eagle Farm Racecourse reserve.

In 1874, a Baptist Church opened in Hendra, having been relocated from Nundah where it had been used as a Baptist church since 1859. A new Baptist Church was opened in Hendra on Sunday 12 April 1891, with the former church to be used as a Sunday school.

Hendra Day School was a small private school operated from circa 1886 by Dora Franz in a building behind her father's home at 6 Best Street. The school closed in 1928 and the school building was bought by the Toombul Croquet Club and relocated to be their clubhouse in York Street, Nundah (where it still remains).

In October 1887, "Hendra Railway Station Estate" was advertised to be auctioned by James R. Dickson & Company Auctioneers. The estate was made up of 83 allotments and was advertised as being close to both Hendra and Clayfield stations. The area was then part of the Shire of Toombul.

In March 1889, "Raceview Estate" comprised 34 allotments, was advertised to be auctioned by John MacNamarra & Co Real Property Salesmen. The estate was part of the Eagle Farm Racecourse Reserve, close to Hendra Railway Station and overlooking the Racecourse itself.

In September 1926, "Petersen Estate" was advertised to be auctioned by A.S.Phillips & Sons, Auctioneers. The estate comprised 25 allotments with some fronting Newmarket and Gerler roads. The remaining streets that formed the estate are now known as Rita St, Dorames St and Olive St. The map advertising the sale also notes its proximity to Hendra State School, Nudgee Road and its convenience to Hendra Railway station.

Our Lady Help of Christians School opened on 29 January 1937. It was operated by the Sisters of St Joseph of the Sacred Heart but today it is operated by Brisbane Catholic Education.

Hendra State High School opened on 29 January 1963. On 1 January 1994 it was renamed Hendra Secondary College. On 1 January 2007 it was renamed Aviation High, as the school is physically close to Brisbane Airport and the associated aviation and aerospace industries. The school decided to make aviation and aerospace a specialty of the school and offers subjects directly related to these industries as well as using them as examples and case studies in general areas of study.

Hendra Centre for Continuing Secondary Education opened on 2 February 1987 on the Hendra State High School campus.

In September 1994, the Hendra virus was first detected in Hendra and took its name from the suburb. The affected stables were owned by the celebrated local horse trainer Vic Rail (who lost his life from the virus) and were located at 10 Williams Avenue.

== Demographics ==
In the 2016 census, Hendra had a population of 4,625 people. The median age of the Hendra population was 39 years, 1 year above the Australian median. 74.2% of people were born in Australia. The next most common countries of birth were England 4.1% and New Zealand 3.2%. 84.8% of people spoke only English at home. The most common responses for religion were Catholic 34.7%, No Religion 22.1% and Anglican 19.0%. Stand alone houses account for 85.2% of occupied private dwellings in Hendra and 11.1 were semi-detached, 4.8% were flats, units or apartments. The median weekly household income was $2,274, compared to the national median of $1,438.

In the 2021 census, Hendra had a population of 4,914 people.

== Heritage listings ==
Hendra has a number of heritage-listed sites, including:

- Ardon (residence), 27 Bowley Street
- Glengariff (also known as Glenaplin, Dura), once the residence of millionaire Thomas Beirne, 5 Derby Street
- Inspice (also known as Glen Lyon), 70 Zillman Road

== Economy ==
Air Australia had its head office in Hendra.

== Education ==
Hendra State School is a government primary (Prep–6) school for boys and girls at 309 Nudgee Road (27.4212°S 153.0744°E). In 2017, the school had an enrolment of 61 students with 9 teachers (4 full-time equivalent) and 8 non-teaching staff (4 full-time equivalent).

Aviation High is a government secondary (7–12) school for boys and girls at Widdop Street (27.4143°S 153.0629°E). In 2017, the school had an enrolment of 426 students with 41 teachers (39 full-time equivalent) and 27 non-teaching staff (17 full-time equivalent).

Our Lady Help of Christians School is a Catholic primary (Prep–6) school for boys and girls at 23 Bowman Street (27.4207°S 153.0667°E). In 2017, the school had an enrolment of 162 students with 18 teachers (12 full-time equivalent) and 9 non-teaching staff (5 full-time equivalent).

== Amenities ==
Hendra is home to an abundance of restaurants and cafes, including local cafés, take-aways, antiques and pubs. Toombul Shopping Centre is the nearest major shopping mall. There are local shops located on Zillman Road, including a medical centre.

Hendra has the Doomben Racecourse, and several parks (notably T.C. Beirne Park), bikeways and walkways. Kedron Brook runs through Hendra, Nundah and Wooloowin and has walking and biking paths running alongside.

Hendra is home to the All Stars Baseball Club, T. C Beirne Park, Ti-trees Swimming Club, and the Northern Suburbs Bridge Club.

=== Churches ===
- Our Lady Help of Christians Parish
- Anglican Parish of Hendra/Clayfield

=== Parks ===
There are a number of parks, including

- Bannister Park (27.4173°S 153.0701°E)
- The Beirne Park (27.4192°S 153.0690°E)

== Transport ==
Hendra railway station is situated on the Doomben railway line. There are regular bus services to and from CBD.
