= Ascot railway station, Brisbane =

Railway station in Queensland, Australia

Ascot
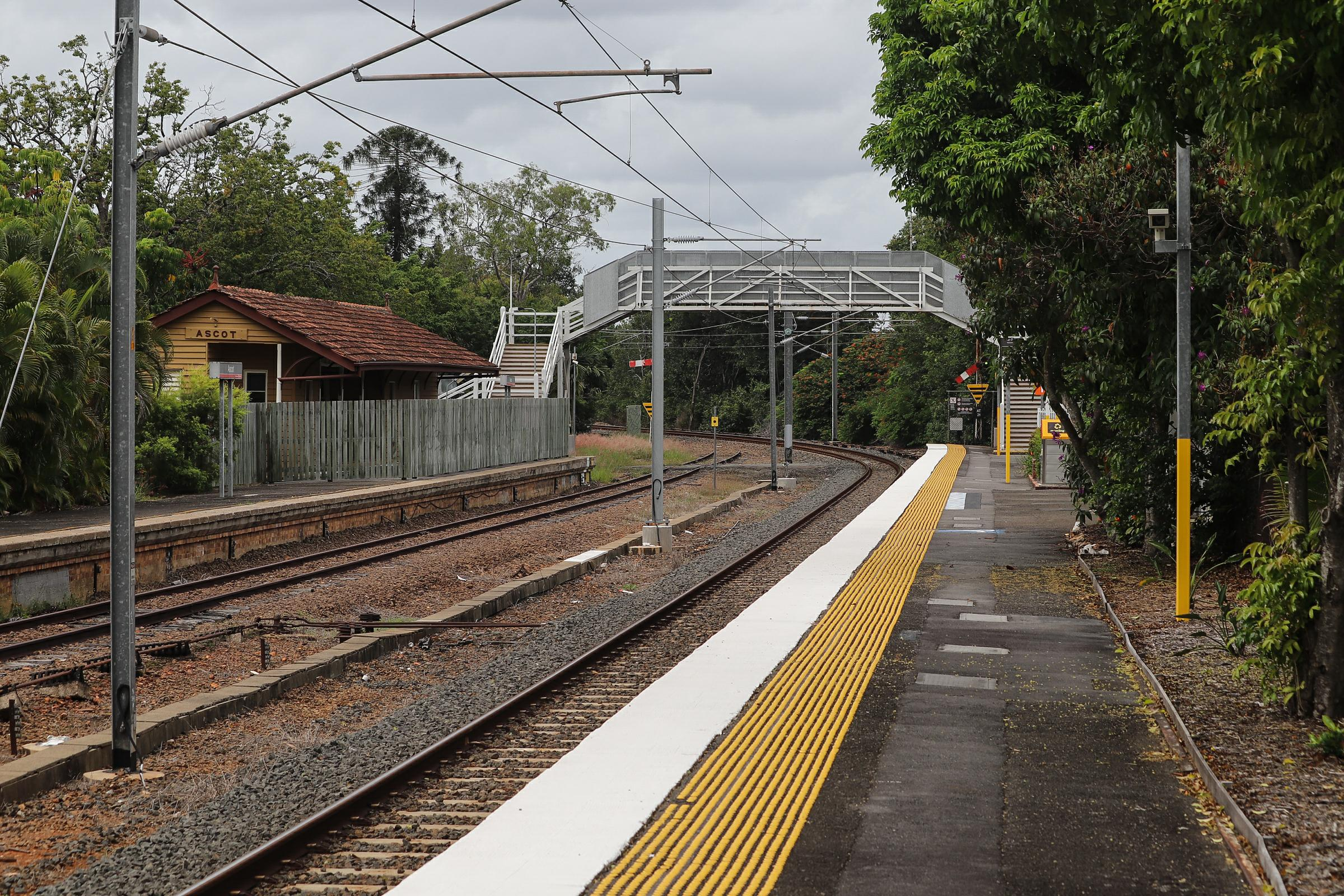
- Eastbound view from platform 1 in March 2018

General information
- Location: McGill Avenue, Ascot
- Coordinates: 27.4299°S 153.0638°E
- Owner: Queensland Rail
- Operator: Queensland Rail
- Line: T3 Doomben
- Distance: 8.90 kilometres from Central
- Platforms: 2 side
- Tracks: 2

Construction
- Structure type: Ground
- Cycle facilities: Yes

Other information
- Status: Unstaffed
- Station code: 600433 (platform 1); 600434 (platform 2)
- Fare zone: Zone 1
- Website: Queensland Rail

History
- Opened: 3 September 1882
- Former names: Hendra Siding; Racecourse

Services
Preceding station	Queensland Rail	Following station
Hendra towards Roma Street	Doomben line	Doomben Terminus
Location

Ascot is a railway station operated by Queensland Rail on the Doomben line. It opened in 1882 and serves the Brisbane suburb of Ascot. It is a ground level station, featuring two side platforms, although only one is in use.

== History ==
Ascot station opened on 3 September 1882 as Hendra Siding coinciding with that of the Pinkenba railway line. It was later renamed Racecourse and eventually renamed as Ascot. The line was electrified on 6 February 1988. All passenger services on the line were suspended on 27 September 1993 as part of a statewide rationalisation of the rail network with the closing or suspending of under-utilised or unprofitable rail lines. Trains continued to serve Ascot when major race events were held.

Passenger services resumed on 27 January 1998, but only as far as Doomben with bus connections to the other abandoned stations.

== Heritage listing ==
A combined entry for Eagle Farm Racecourse and Ascot Railway Station was listed in the Queensland Heritage Register in 2004.

== Platforms and services ==
Ascot station is served by two trains per hour off-peak on weekdays, with services calling at all stations towards, Roma Street, Boggo Road (formerly Park Road) and Cleveland. From 1 June 2025, Sunday and public holiday services began running with hourly services running between 7:58am and 7:59pm.

Ascot platform arrangement
Platform	Line	Destination	Notes
1	Doomben	Roma Street, Doomben	
2	Not currently in use		
