= Ascot, Queensland =

Ascot
- Suburb
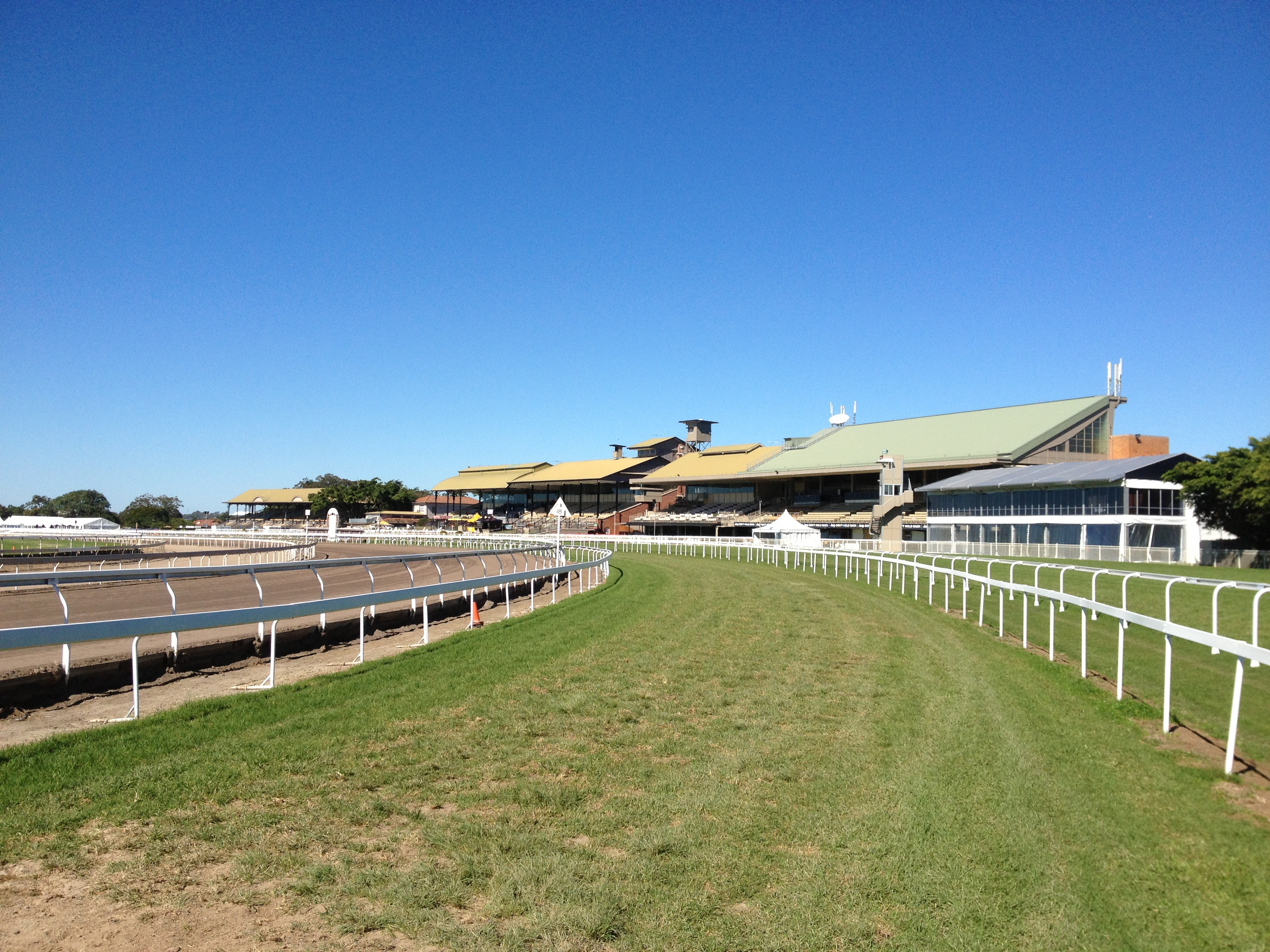
- Eagle Farm Racecourse

- Interactive map of Ascot
- Coordinates: 27.4297°S 153.0638°E
- Country: Australia
- State: Queensland
- City: Brisbane
- LGA: City of Brisbane (Hamilton Ward)
- Location: 6.5 km (4.0 mi) NE of Brisbane CBD

Government
  - State electorate: Clayfield
  - Federal division: Brisbane

Area
  - Total: 2.7 km^{2} (1.0 sq mi)
- Elevation: 14 m (46 ft)

Population
  - Total: 6,531 (2021 census)
  - Density: 2,420/km^{2} (6,260/sq mi)
- Time zone: UTC+10:00 (AEST)
- Postcode: 4007
Suburbs around Ascot
Clayfield	Hendra	Eagle Farm
Albion	Ascot	Eagle Farm
Albion	Hamilton	Hamilton

Ascot is a north-east suburb in the City of Brisbane, Queensland, Australia. In the 2021 census, Ascot had a population of 6,531 people.

== Geography ==
Ascot is characterised by large Queenslander homes and is located approximately 6.5 kilometres (4.0 mi) north-east of Brisbane GPO. Ascot is best known for its beautiful old homes, the picturesque poinciana tree lined shopping area of Racecourse Road (27.4326°S 153.0654°E), and for the Eagle Farm (27.4296°S 153.0664°E) and Doomben (27.4278°S 153.0756°E) racecourses popular for racing carnivals. Over a third of the suburb is taken up by Doomben and its related outer buildings, Eagle Farm and Doomben racecourses.

Bartleys Hill is in the south-west of the suburb (27.4313°S 153.0522°E) and is 78 metres (256 ft) above sea level.

== History ==
Historically, the land was occupied by the Aboriginal Turrbal clan. The Turrbal called the area Yowoggerra, meaning corroboree place. The clan had camping grounds on the north side of the Brisbane River around the Breakfast Creek area. It was at Breakfast Creek that explorers Oxley and Cunningham met members of the clan in 1824. The clan was often called the 'Duke of York's clan' by whites. In 1858 two Aborigines, Dalinkua and Dalpie from the Breakfast Creek area, wrote letters to The Moreton Bay Courier protesting against the treatment their people.

Convicts were used in the 1830s to clear land and build basic roads. Within a decade wealthy free settlers took land with a view of the Brisbane River. In 1855, pastoralist James Sutherland purchased a large portion of land in the Brisbane area, including Ascot and its surrounds. He built one of Ascot's surviving and historically listed homes, Windermere.

Bartleys Hill was named after writer Nehemiah Bartley who owned land in the area.

The Eagle Farm Racecourse was established in 1863. Horse racing was one of the earliest sports in Brisbane and the name "Ascot" was given to the suburb as a tongue-in cheek reference to Ascot, England, and its prestigious Ascot Racecourse. There were racing stables throughout the suburb until the late 1920s.

Due to the popularity of the horse races, in 1882 a railway line branch was extended from Eagle Junction to the Eagle Farm Racecourse in Ascot.

In June 1892, the "Lancaster Gardens Estate", consisting of 196 allotments, was advertised to be auctioned by Arthur Martin & Co. Limited, auctioneers. A map advertising the auction states the properties are opposite the racecourse and close to Racecourse Railway Station. It was originally the magnificent property known as Lancaster's Pineapple Gardens.

St Margaret's Anglican Girls' School opened in 1895.

In 1899, the first electric tram service was extended to Ascot. Trams which ran from Hamilton along Racecourse Road, Lancaster Road and terminated in Alexandra Road continued until 1969.

Ascot State School opened on 24 May 1920.

Ascot One Teacher State School opened on 22 October 1934 as a teacher-training school in the grounds of Ascot State School. It was to prepare teachers for teaching in Queensland's many one-teacher schools in rural areas. It closed in 1973.

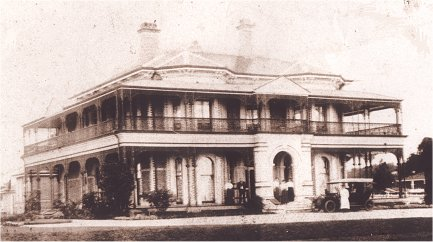
"Nyrambla" 21 Henry Street, Ascot, from Yabba Street, in its early days

In May 1938, the "Jolimont Estate" consisting of 4 allotments was advertised to be auctioned by Isles Love & Co., Auctioneers. The surveyor was C. F. Bennett. A map advertising the auction states the Estate had easy access to the tram and all conveniences, with beautiful easterly aspects and wonderful views.

During World War II, several buildings were used by General Douglas MacArthur and the Central Bureau, which had its headquarters at "Nyrambla", 21 Henry Street. In July 1942, MacArthur moved his headquarters to Queen Street in Brisbane city. The Central Bureau work of intercepting and decoding Japanese intelligence remained in Ascot.

Also used was the fire station at 77 Kitchener Road and several other locations in nearby Hamilton. In 1941 military authorities took over the racecourse, then known as Camp Ascot, to house thousands of American troops. Camp Ascot was home to several US units, including the 2nd battalion of the 131st Field Artillery Regiment and the 35th Fighter Group comprising the 39th, 40th and 41st Fighter Squadrons and Headquarters Squadron.

From the 1990s, the old servants' quarters of "Nyrambla" were home to the late Australian actor Bille Brown (1952–2013), honorary ambassador for Queensland for his stage work in the Queensland Theatre Company in Brisbane and the Royal Shakespeare Company.

== Demographics ==
In the 2001 census, Ascot had a population of 4,543 people.

In the 2006 census, Ascot had a population of 5,330 people.

In the 2011 census, Ascot had a population of 5,730 people.

In the 2016 census, Ascot had a population of 5,777 people, 52% female and 48% male. The median age of the Ascot population was 39 years, higher than the national median of 38. 69.2% of people were born in Australia, compared to the national average of 66.7%; the next most common countries of birth were England 4.2%, New Zealand 3.9% and India 2.3%. 80.1% of people only spoke English at home. The most common responses for religion in Ascot were Catholic 28.8%, No Religion 25.4% and Anglican 20.0%. Of the total 2,295 occupied private residences, 48.4% were separate houses, 43.2% were flats or apartments and 7.5% were semi-detached.

In the 2021 census, Ascot had a population of 6,531 people.

== Heritage listings ==
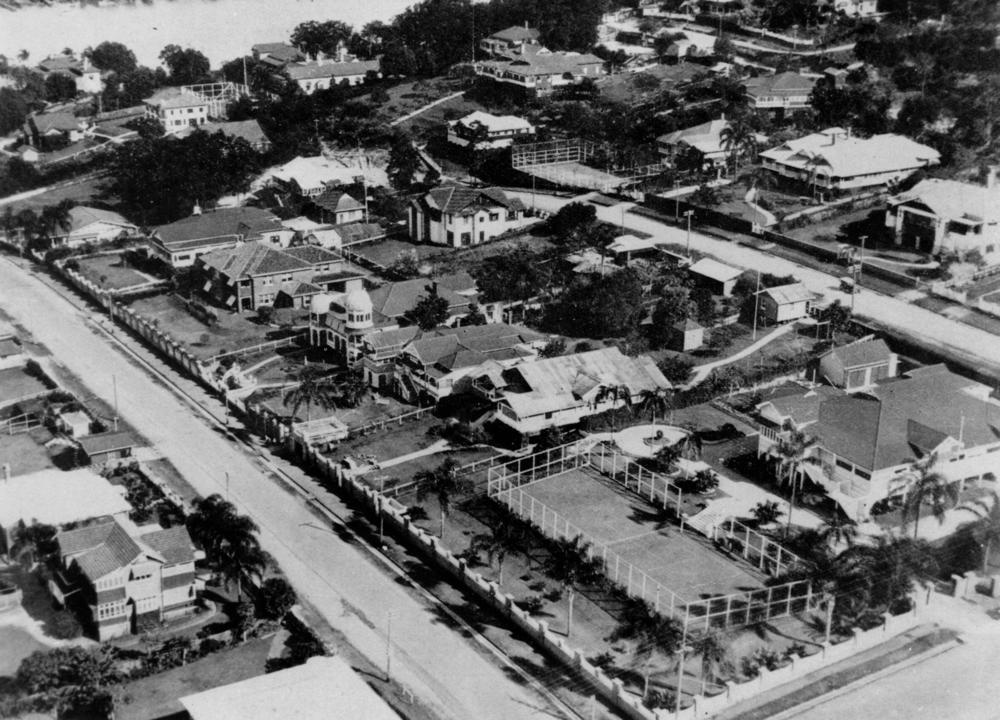
Aerial view of the Riverview Terrace area of Ascot c. 1930

Ascot has a number of heritage-listed sites, including:

- 230 Lancaster Road: Eagle Farm Racecourse and Ascot Railway Station (as a joint listing of these connected sites)
- 251 Lancaster Road: Musket Villa
- Pringle Street: Ascot State School
- 1 Rupert Terrace: Chateau Nous
- 14 Sutherland Avenue: Windermere

Windermere house has one of the longest family histories in Ascot. It was built by founder of the Ascot suburb James Sutherland for his daughter. After marrying politician/pastoralist John George Appel, the home remained in part of Appel family estate. It is a large home with large surrounding gardens, keeping the house private from view. It has Queenslander style verandahs and each corner is elaborated, one with large bay window, the other with a corner pavilion.

== Transport ==
Ascot railway station (27.4296°S 153.0634°E) and Doomben railway station (27.4313°S 153.0750°E) provide access to Citytrain services.

== Education ==
Ascot State School is a government primary (Prep–6) school for boys and girls at Pringle Street (27.4326°S 153.0559°E). In 2018, the school had an enrolment of 757 students with 53 teachers (45 full-time equivalent) and 26 non-teaching staff (17 full-time equivalent). It includes a special education program.

St Margaret's Anglican Girls School is a private primary and secondary (Prep–12) school for girls at 11 Petrie Street (27.4307°S 153.0500°E). In 2018, the school had an enrolment of 920 students with 94 teachers (84 full-time equivalent) and 93 non-teaching staff (64 full-time equivalent).

There are no government secondary schools in Ascot. The nearest government secondary schools are Aviation High in neighbouring Hendra to the north and Kedron State High School in Kedron to the north-west.

Ascot has a kindergarten in Kitchener Road and a preschool in Barlow Street.
