= Doomben railway station =

Railway station in Brisbane, Queensland, Australia

Doomben
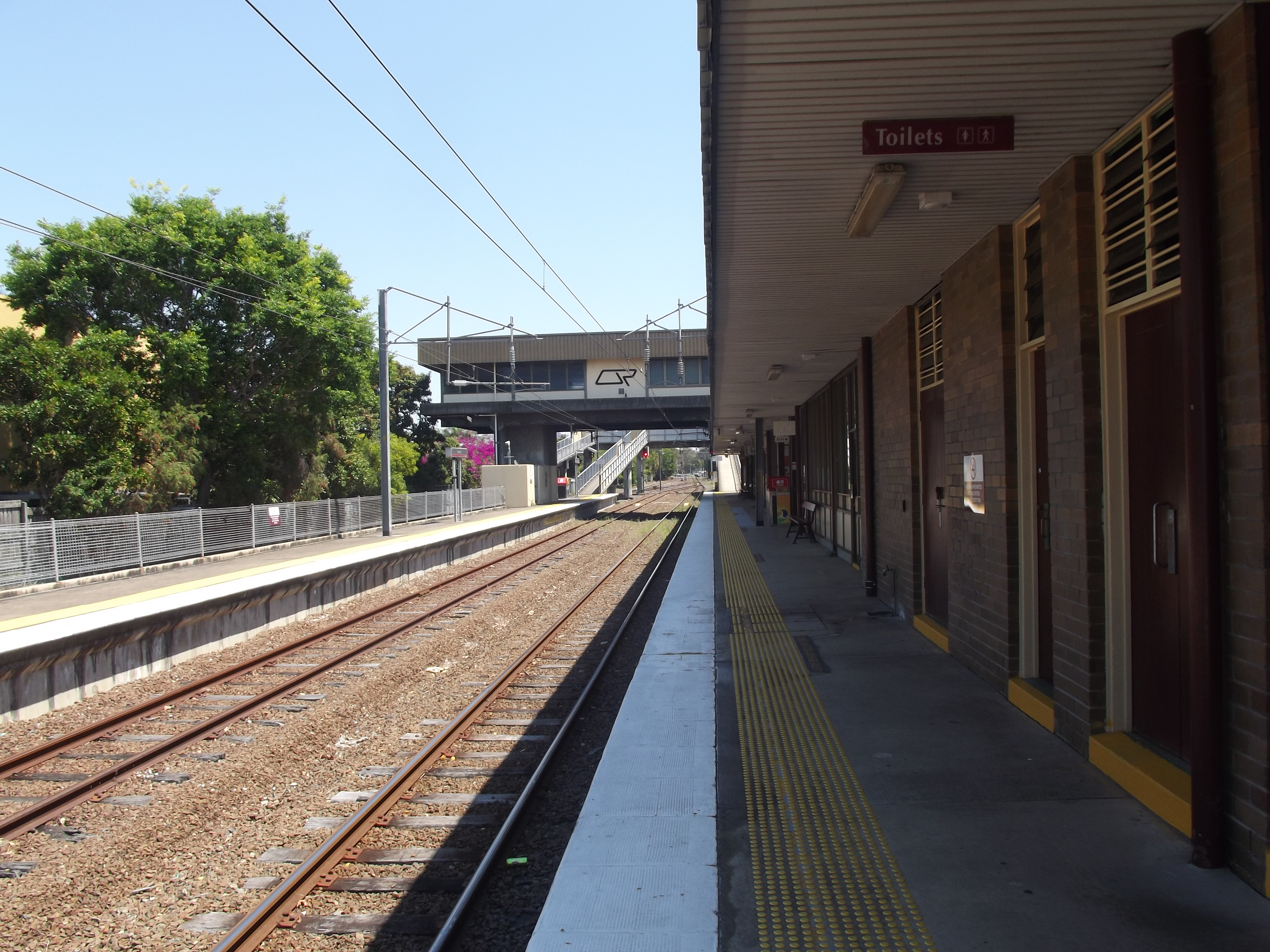
- Westbound view from Platform 1 in October 2012

General information
- Location: Lamington Avenue, Ascot
- Coordinates: 27°25′53″S 153°04′31″E
- Owner: Queensland Rail
- Operator: Queensland Rail
- Line: Pinkenba
- Distance: 9.90 kilometres from Central
- Platforms: 2 side
- Tracks: 2

Construction
- Structure type: Ground
- Parking: 6 bays

Other information
- Status: Staffed
- Station code: 600435 (platform 1); 600436 (platform 2)
- Fare zone: go card 1
- Website: Queensland Rail

History
- Opened: 1976
- Former names: Whinstanes-Doomben

Services
Preceding station	Queensland Rail	Following station
Ascot towards Roma Street	Doomben line	Terminus
Former Services
Ascot towards Roma Street	Pinkenba line	Eagle Farm towards Pinkenba
Location

Doomben railway station is the terminal station of the Doomben line in Queensland, Australia. It serves the Brisbane suburb of Ascot adjacent to Doomben Racecourse.

== History ==
The Pinkenba line opened on 1 April 1897 to Pinkenba. A station for Doomben Racecourse was opened in 1909 alongside the Nudgee Road level crossing, and in 1976 a new station named Whinstanes-Doomben opened slightly further east. Whinstanes was the name of the industrial branch line that crosses Kingsford Smith Drive to the Hamilton Cold Stores. The original Doomben station was closed.

The new station was renamed Doomben when the line was electrified on 6 February 1988. All passenger services on the line were suspended on 27 September 1993 as part of a statewide rationalisation of the rail network with the closing or suspending of under-utilised or unprofitable rail lines. Trains continued to serve Doomben when major race events were held.

Passenger services resumed on 27 January 1998. Doomben became the terminal station with bus connections to the other abandoned stations.

== Services ==
Doomben is the terminus for all stops services to and from Roma Street, Boggo Road and Cleveland.

== Platforms and services ==
Doomben platform arrangement
Platform	Line	Destination	Notes
1	Doomben	Roma Street	
2	Not currently in use		

== Transport links ==
Transport for Brisbane operate two bus routes from Doomben station:

- 301 Toombul to Cultural Centre
- 303: to Myrtletown via Pinkenba
