= Aviation State High School =

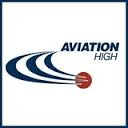

Location
- Widdop Street; Hendra; Brisbane, Queensland, 4011; Australia; 27°24′49.6″S 153°03′51.4″E

Information
- Former names: Hendra State High School (1963-1990) Hendra Secondary College (1990-2007)
- School type: Public, secondary
- Motto: Pursue Excellence
- Established: 29 January 1963
- Local authority: Department of Education (Queensland)
- Principal: David Munn
- Years offered: 7–12
- Age range: 12–18
- Enrollment: 625 (2023)
- Hours in school day: 6
- Campus size: 9 hectares (90,000 m^{2})
- Houses: Kingsford-Smith, Miller, Hinkler
- Colours: Red, navy and white
- Website: aviationhigh.eq.edu.au

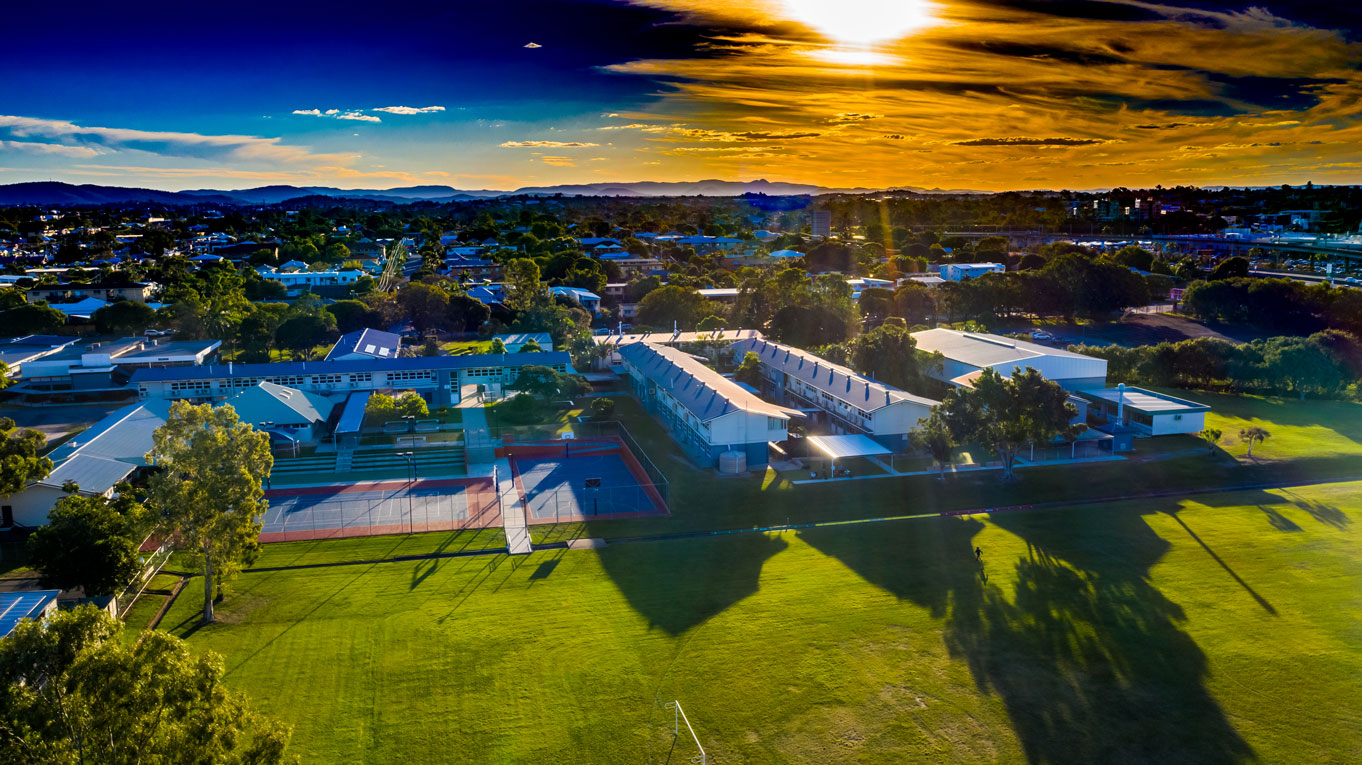
Aerial photo of the grounds of Aviation State High School facing west

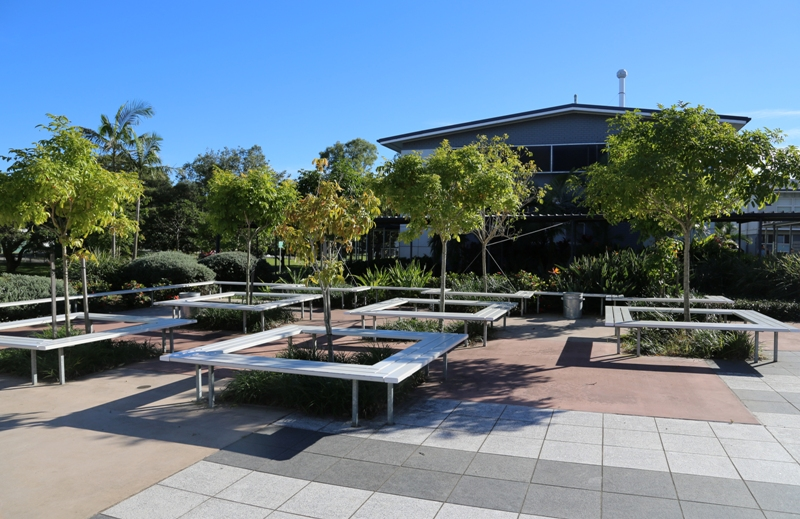
Seating grounds for students inside Aviation State High school

Aviation State High School is a coeducational independent public secondary school located in Hendra, Brisbane, Queensland. In the 2023 annual report, the school had a total enrolment of 625 students. The Principal is David Munn.

As an independent state high school in Queensland, Australia, Aviation SHS uses a catchment area based enrolment system, and out of catchment enrolment through a Selective Entry Process.

Aviation High is also home to No. 220 Squadron, Australian Air Force Cadets, where cadet activities, and weekly Monday night parades are held, with the squadron's headquarters housed in a demountable building.

== History ==
Aviation State High School opened on 29 January 1963 as Hendra State High School. In its first year, the school had 3 classrooms, a typing room, art room, and library. In the mid 1970s, enrolment had grown to over a thousand and funds were used to build the Assembly Hall. In 1990 the school rebranded as Hendra Secondary College to provide education not only to high school students, but also to adults who could enrol in the school and participate in grades 10–12, in night classes.

In February 2022, the school was shut down after being devastated by the 2022 eastern Australia floods. It was refurbished and reopened for the start of Term 2 in late April.

== "Gateway to Aerospace Industries" programme ==
In 2004, the school became part of the "Gateway to the Aerospace Industries" programme. This programme added elements to the curriculum at schools around the state, in order to give students an environment that was relevant to their careers in the aviation industry. It does this by incorporating aviation themes and topics into each subject, as well as by promoting pathways to aviation careers.

Classes commenced in January 2007 under the new name of "Aviation High", although it would take over a year before uniforms and other items bearing the previous name Hendra Secondary College were completely replaced.

== Sports ==
Aviation High has three sporting houses that compete against each other, Miller (green), Hinkler (red), and Kingsford-Smith (yellow), named after famous Australian aviators Robin Miller, Bert Hinkler, and Charles Kingsford-Smith respectively.

== Infrastructure and Facilities ==
The school has 11 main buildings, A, B, C, D, E, H, J, K, L blocks, the Hall, and the Canteen. A Block is mainly computer rooms, with one science lab on the lower level of the building. B block is where the communications department has many rooms, with the exception of a Technology lab, and a Computer workshop, leased to the Rotary Club of Nundah. A dedicated high-end computer room, where coding classes take place, and a recording studio, are also located in this block. C block is a multi-use block, with the administration office and many general-use classrooms being located here. D block is the Aeroskills Technology Block, where Manual Arts and Graphics takes place. The block has 3 workshops and one classroom - for Graphics. A laser cutter is located in this block. E block is an annex to A block, with a Multi Media Room (Theatre) and Career Education being housed here. H block is where the Hospitality kitchens are located, as well as theory classrooms, and a cabin-crew training area, with actual seats from a Boeing 767 being used for realism. J block is the dedicated Science block, with 4 science laboratories and a special room for Flight Simulator's inside J block. Most Science classes are held here, and are all fitted with smart-boards as standard. K Block is another name for the Library. The Library houses over 1000 books, and a gym underneath for HPE classes. There are also 2 annexes for classes to be held, or presentations to be given as well as a computer room.

L Block is where Art classes are held. Inside is a studio, and a Mac Lab. Outside is a Fire-powered kiln, for clay works completed over the year. Next to L block is the Hall, which is used for Futsal, Basketball, Assemblies and (once) plane storage. The hall is well used.

The school has a canteen.

=== Enrolment ===
The number of enrolments as recorded in May 2022 was 599 students, an increase of over 200 since 2015, when enrolment stood at 376 students. As a state high school, Aviation SHS is managed by enrolment management plan that requires the school to act as the state high school for a catchment area of suburbs, providing every child within the area a state school to attend. Any student who lives primarily within the school's catchment area is entitled to enrol at the school, with school reserving places at the school for children who move into the catchment area during the school year. The catchment area for Aviation SHS bounds the suburbs of Hamilton, Ascot, Clayfield, Toombul, Nundah, and the Brisbane Airport zone and surrounding suburbs extending to the Brisbane River. In addition, Aviation SHS is a selective independent school. Where there are positions available, out-of-catchment area students may apply through a selective entry process, requiring the student to sit an AGAT test, and attend a school enrolment interview.

== Curriculum & Activities ==
=== Aviation Centred Learning ===
Aviation High tries to include aviation into its subjects where possible, this is achieved through aviation centred learning, where aviation themed questions are used to deliver the syllabus, such as aviation-related mathematics (e.g. Find the distance a plane can fly with x amount of fuel) and science. From year nine onwards, Aviation High also has classes dedicated to aviation (such as avionics and aerospace studies). There are lunchtime and after-school programs and activities such as, UAV (Unmanned Aerial Vehicle) Club, Flight Simulator Club, Hangar/Engineering Club, and more. These programs are accessible to all students from years 7–12.

=== Partnerships ===
The school has partnerships with companies offering entry into courses relating to aircraft maintenance and cabin-crew training, especially Aviation Australia, as well as partnerships with TAFEs for students to access vocational training.
