= Rationalization (economics) =

Attempt to change a pre-existing ad hoc workflow into one based on a published rules set

In economics, rationalization is an attempt to change a pre-existing ad hoc workflow into one that is based on a set of published rules. There is a tendency, in modern times, to quantify experience, knowledge, and work. Means–end (goal-oriented) rationality is used to precisely calculate that which is necessary to attain a goal. Its effectiveness varies with the enthusiasm of the workers for the changes being made, the skill with which management applies the rules, and the degree to which the rules fit the job.

Rationalization aims to increase efficiency by better using existing possibilities: The same effect can with fewer means, or with the same means to be obtained. In the industry, thereby, machines often designate the replacement of manpower (rationalization investment).

Julien Freund defines rationalization as "the organization of life through a division and coordination of activities on the basis of exact study of men's relations with each other, with their tools and their environment, for the purpose of achieving greater efficiency and productivity". According to Ulbo de Sitter, the act of organizing work tasks into work flows and processes involves the splitting of tasks into two sub-categories: parts, representing proceeding work tasks in time, and aspects, referring to work tasks that are different in nature rather than in time. This type of rationalization can be applied to physical as well as administrative work tasks.

The rationalization process is the practical application of knowledge to achieve a desired end. Its purpose is to bring about efficiency, coordination, and control of the natural and social environment. It is a product of "scientific specialization and technical differentiation" that seems to be a characteristic of Western culture. Rationalization is the guiding principle behind bureaucracy and the increasing division of labor, and has led to an increase in both the production and distribution of goods and services. It is also associated with secularization without its more positive component of humanism, with depersonalization and with oppressive routine.

Increasingly, human behavior is to be guided by observation, experiment, and reason (zweckrational). Change in human character is expected to be part of the process; rationalization and bureaucratization promote efficiency, and materialism, both of which are subsumed under Weber's concept of zweckrational.

In recent years, “rationalization” has become jargon for, or euphemism of, budget cuts or layoffs.

== Economic rationalization ==
The concept of economic rationalism refers to the ability of individuals and organizations involved in business transactions to make logical decisions that yield net positive outcomes for all stakeholders, including ownership, employees, customers, and the community at large. Because such outcomes are the result of rational choices, it is, therefore, possible to predict with some accuracy the economic behavior of those stakeholders. In theory, this ability to forecast behavior allows decision-makers to implement strategies that will maximize potential gains and minimize losses. Colloquially, the term 'economic rationalization' is often used as an umbrella phrase referring to any business-related decision intended to improve productivity, increase profits, and/or reduce costs arrived at through an insightful analysis of stakeholder behavior.

In the classical conceptualization of free-market economic theory, the underlying assumption is that production and consumption are self-regulating in that producers and consumers ultimately behave in ways that produce the greatest benefit for society, the metaphorical invisible hand conceptualized by Scottish economist Adam Smith in the 18th century. Smith claimed that economies worked best when left unregulated, a laissez-faire approach to conducting business that was predicated upon the belief that, "businesspeople naturally invest their capitals where they believe they can generate the most value. Indeed, they are likely to be much better judges of this, understanding more about the local situation, than some distant regulator". This assumption that both the markets themselves as well as the people who participate in them will act in a logical manner would be a foundational concept in economic theory until the early 21st century.

When the global economic crisis crippled world markets in 2008, it became apparent that businesses had conducted themselves with anything but logic. Citing the failure of financial organizations and lending institutions to govern their business behavior in a prudent and sustainable manner, former chairman of the U.S. Federal Reserve Alan Greenspan conceded that economists had "made a mistake in presuming that the self-interest of organizations, specifically banks and others, was such that they were best capable of protecting their own shareholders". What the subprime mortgage fiasco of the new millennium revealed was that markets are vulnerable to the cognitive biases of human thought, giving rise to a new conceptualization of economic rationalization recognized as behavioral economics. By critically challenging long-held assumptions about human nature and how it impacts business decisions, corporate interests can take a more rational approach to conducting business in a much more pragmatic manner.

== Etymology ==
The concept of rationality in economics is essentially no different than the manner with which philosophers view practical rationality as it applies to other disciplines in which there exist models of sound judgment, inferencing, and decision-making. Rationality is thus understood as the process through which reasonable conclusions are reached on the basis of thoughtful consideration of demonstrable proof so that the optimal result may be achieved. The fundamental cost-benefit analysis is a typical manifestation of the rationalization process in that the calculated advantages or rewards received will demonstrably outweigh the incurred sacrifice required to obtain those gains. Where the term becomes complicated is the point at which rationality is presumed to label a decision as being successful or unsuccessful, when the reality is that rational decision-making refers to the actual process of making a choice and not the choice itself. When individuals decide what is the best course of action, they do so according to what they perceive is most beneficial and/or fulfilling to them, based on whatever data they have available for consideration. So long as the outcome is consistent with the reasons for electing to behave in that way, the decision is a rational one. The comic book collector who pays thousands of dollars for a collectible issue that completes a long-incomplete series in lieu of buying groceries for the family may not be making a wise choice or even a prudent decision. If this behavior is consistent with the collector's past choices and has been a stated long-term goal, however, then such behavior is nevertheless rational. Rationality is applicable to why a choice was made and what motivated that decision rather than being applied as an evaluative assessment of the choice itself.

== Rationality in Economics ==
In business, it is imperative that consumers and producers/providers make rational decisions based upon the logical consideration of observed behavior. Given the potentially irrational behavior of most human beings at various times and in various situations under various conditions, the ability to accurately predict such behavior is challenging but necessary if rational decision-making is to occur. By acknowledging the irrationality of governance, employee relations, marketing, customer service, spending patterns, product preferences, trends, and both public and corporate perceptions, stakeholders are more likely to make more rational decisions when it comes to conducting business.

Rationality in economics is therefore no longer dependent upon the traditional economic theory of laissez-fair capitalists, but more so on the observations of psychologists and human behavior analysts. Economic rationality accepts that human beings will behave in a manner that is based largely on individual needs and wants, irrational impulses, misconceptions, and personal circumstances, all of which render their behavior illogical. This does not mean, however, that such behavior is unpredictable. The rational principle of supply and demand dictates that highly sought-after products in limited availability will net greater profits, regardless of how irrational it may be to demand such items or to pay such prices to obtain them. As long as consumers can rationalize their behavior – or producers can offer a rationalization to them – economists can more rationally predict outcomes. For instance, a consumer's behavior indicates a preference for product A over product B, and product B over product C. In this scenario, an economic analyst should reasonably conclude that this consumer will never purchase product C when products A and B are available. The consumer, however, may violate this logical assumption and purchase product C regardless of the availability of the preferred others when there is no way to rationalize the purchase of A or B instead of C. As rationalization is associated with the decision making the process more so than the decision itself, the explanation for this consumer's seemingly unpredictable choice is rooted in the human psychological need to rationalize behavior: “Everyone feels that as a rational creature he must be able to give a connected, logical, and continuous account of himself, his conduct, and opinions, and all his mental processes are unconsciously manipulated and revised to that end”. For businesses, the key is to predict the rationalization process employed by consumers. For consumers, rationality is going to be determined by the availability, acquisition, and interpretation of the information needed to make informed decisions.

== Rational choice theory ==
Rational choice theory (RCT) is a theoretical framework postulated on the belief that every decision made by an individual is done so by means of a thorough consideration of all substantiated benefits in comparison with the known costs of making a specific choice in a given situation. This methodical process is essentially considered a universal phenomenon and a natural attribute of the human condition, an anthropological feature of homo economicus, the calculating, negotiating, and materialistic characterization of human beings. Economists have traditionally favoured RCT because it more easily gives rise to economic models that may be used to predict human behavior on a more macro level.

There are four primary assumptions about human nature that form the foundation of RCT as a model of economic rationalization: 1). the decisions and subsequent behavior of an individual are inherently rational as a result of accurately and logically factoring both the rewards and costs of the proposed choice; 2). the reward will logically and demonstrably outweigh the underlying overheads or expenses of proceeding with the proposed action and/or for the action to be successfully completed; 3). in the event that the value of the expected reward decreases to a level below that of the costs being incurred, an individual will disengage from the action; 4). an individual in an economy is compelled to use and is limited to only those resources that are available for the achievement of the reward. In this conceptualization, RCT offers a universally applicable paradigm to explain and predict the economic decisions of individual consumers, larger cohorts of consumers, and even the intricacies of corporate entities.

One of the more often cited critiques of RCT is that human beings are unique individuals who exist within and must respond to a variety of circumstances and necessities, making a universally applicable pattern of decision-making a dubious proposition. The choices individuals will make are therefore always going to be contingent upon a number of situation-specific variables. Others contend that RCT is better conceptualized as a set of tools that can help explain individual behavior in specific contexts using universal behavioral concepts as opposed to offering a conclusive archetypal psychological account of human behavior that can be used to accurately predict future action. RCT is also criticized for its inability to rationalize reasoning predicated upon intuition or instinct, relying almost exclusively on empirical behavioral analysis to explain and predict decision-making.

== Bounded rationality ==
Given that the necessary proof upon which a logical decision must be based is not always accessible or even known to decision-makers, the need to acquire data becomes paramount in the decision-making process. Unlike the unbounded rationality assumed in rational choice theory, in which conclusions are reached based upon all necessary relevant information being available for consideration, the realistic limitations of most decision-making scenarios force human beings to search for data, a process that requires time, effort, and other resources that may not be contributable to this search. Because it offers a more realistic interpretation of human behavior without the need for vast amounts of empirical data, it is this more limited application of logic and reasoning that is likely to define contemporary economic rationalism.

To compensate for this lack of demonstrable proof, decisions are often rendered on the basis of predictions or assumptions about the potential behavior of individuals and groups. Because plausible assumptions rely upon some form of observed or confirmed precedent, there remains a certain logical element to bounded rationality. Decision-making of this sort does not simply identify norms, rather it considers actual behavior – rational or otherwise – and uses this limited but observable data to make reasonable predictions about future behavior, a process often referred to as optimization under constraints. Unlike unbounded rationality, bounded rationality is less concerned with defining ideal behavioral outcomes as opposed to examining real-life behavior in specific situations and using this information to predict what will likely be the actual outcome instead of what should be the optimal achievement. Given the propensity for human beings to act in often irrational ways, ironically the most rational way to predict behavior is to simply consider the data that is available rather than attempting to correlate and synthesize a more exhaustive cache of relevant information sources and theoretical models. Bounded rationalization is thus a more practical, manageable, and versatile approach to understanding and predicting human behavior.

== Limitations of economic rationality ==
Whether they are the result of rational choice theory or bounded rationality, changes implemented on the basis of logical analysis of behavioral data are intended to increase rewards by reducing costs. In an age in which corporate social responsibility is a fundamental component of a successful enterprise, businesses must strive to establish and maintain an identity that transcends the classic model of profit-first capitalism in favour of becoming a more socially conscious entity. In the pursuit of a more rational manner of operating, an organization can inadvertently compromise its commitment to the greater public good in its efforts to achieve greater rewards. First, because rationalization tends to advocate greater efficiency of individual components – namely employees – there can develop an emphasis on achieving self-interested goals that demonstrate improved productivity rather than fostering a greater focus on goals that are more concerned with the public interest. Similarly, employee levels of independence and creativity have been reported to decrease proportionately with increased levels of rationalization, as the implementation of standard operating procedures, streamlined for maximum efficiency, reduce options, limit choice, and ultimately stifle creativity.

== See also ==
- Automation
- Labor (economics)
- Managerial economics
- Max Weber
- Outline of management
- Scientific management
