= Woody Point Memorial Hall =

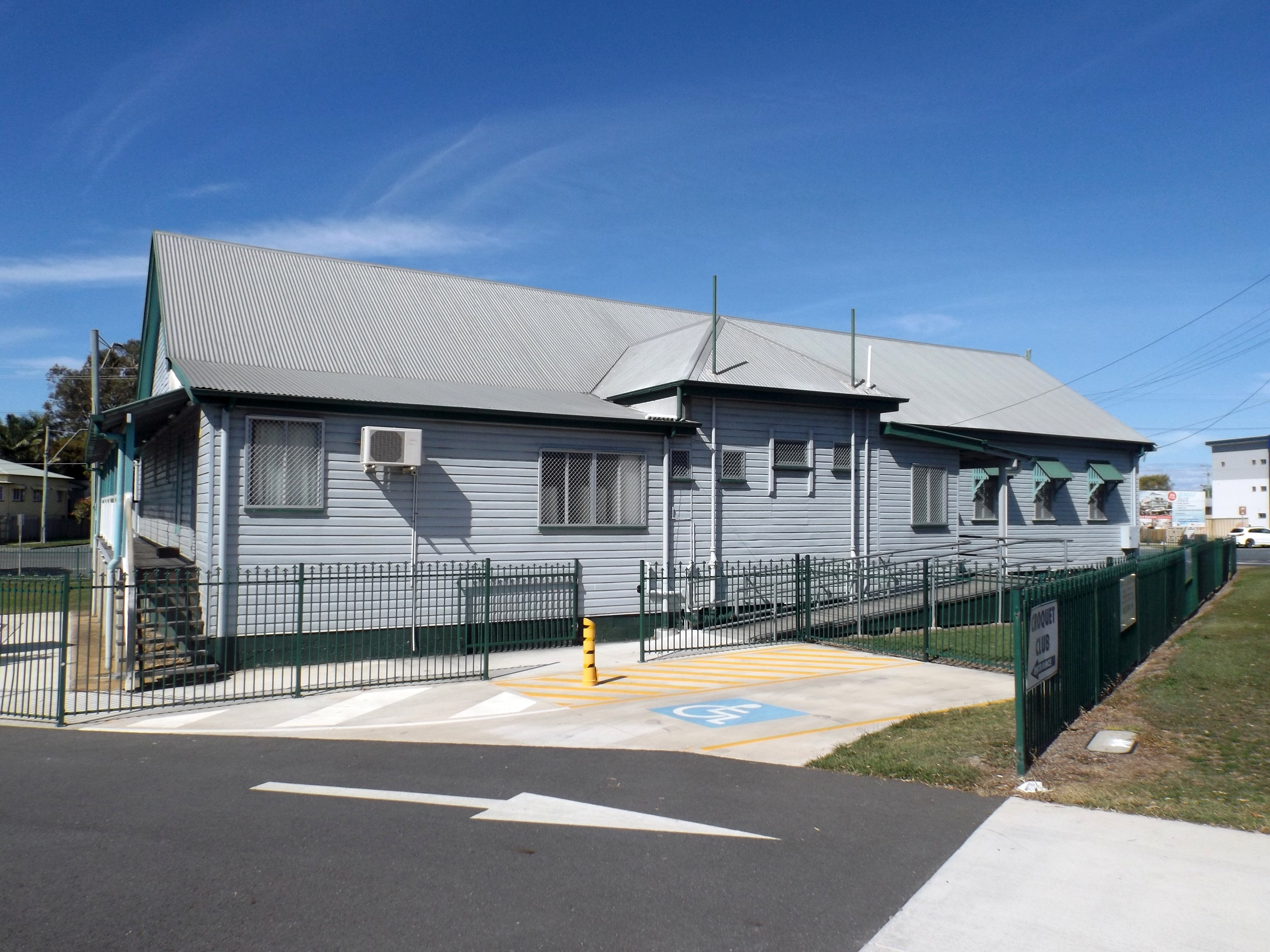
- Side of building, 2016

- Location within Queensland Location within Australia
- 27.26°S 153.1036°E
- Location: Hornibrook Esplanade, Woody Point, City of Moreton Bay, Queensland, Australia

History
- Design period: 1919–1930s (interwar period)

Site notes
- Architect: Hubert George Octavius Thomas
- Owner: Moreton Bay City Council

Queensland Heritage Register
- Official name: Woody Point Memorial Hall
- Type: state heritage (built)
- Designated: 14 March 2014
- Reference no.: 602828
- Significant period: 1922–present
- Significant components: flagpole/flagstaff, memorial – honour board/ roll of honour, stage/sound shell

Woody Point Memorial Hall is a heritage-listed school of arts at Hornibrook Esplanade, Woody Point, City of Moreton Bay, Queensland, Australia. It was designed by Hubert George Octavius Thomas. It was added to the Queensland Heritage Register on 14 March 2014.

== History ==
The former Woody Point Memorial School of Arts, now known as the Woody Point War Memorial Hall, is a timber building located at the corner of Hornibrook Esplanade and Oxley Avenue, Woody Point. It was officially opened on 4 March 1922 and contains an honour board listing 94 men from the Redcliffe Peninsula who enlisted in World War I (WWI), along with the names of three war workers. The hall, which initially included a library and reading room, is a product of both the mechanics' institute / school of arts movement, and post-World War I efforts in Queensland to commemorate those who served and those who died in World War I. It demonstrates the "utilitarian" approach to war memorials, and continues to be used by the local community for multiple purposes, including World War I commemoration.

For many years the Redcliffe Peninsula was known as Humpybong, the name that the local Aboriginal people, the Ningy Ningy, gave to the abandoned convict settlement (1824–25) at Red Cliff Point. In 1861 23,000 acres (9308 hectares) of the peninsula and the Petrie area were declared an agricultural reserve, and from 1862 onwards a number of farm portions were sold. Land at Woody Point was first sold in 1864. Very little development occurred on the Redcliffe Peninsula until the 1880s when the land speculation boom in Brisbane during this decade extended to the peninsula, and the area's identity as a seaside resort solidified at this time. However, agricultural use of much of the area continued into the 1940s.

A small township sprang up at Woody Point, principally because it was the closest point to Sandgate – to which a railway line opened in May 1882. A jetty was completed at Woody Point by March 1882, allowing ferries, carrying both passengers and goods, to arrive from Sandgate. The Woody Point jetty was extended in 1889–90; a new jetty opened in 1922, and a third incarnation opened in 2009. A number of vessels, including the Redcliffe, Pearl and Garnet, and later the Emerald, Olivine and Beryl, ran regular services between Sandgate and Woody Point. Ferry services continued until 1930.

Although the Redcliffe Peninsula was popular with holiday makers, residential development was hindered for many years by the peninsula's isolation. The Caboolture Divisional Board cleared the first road on the peninsula, running from Woody Point to Scarborough, in the early 1880s, and this road later became Oxley Avenue. A jetty was built near Redcliffe Point in 1885. The railway reached North Pine in 1888, but was not extended to Redcliffe, despite persistent local lobbying.

However, holiday visitors prompted the expansion of facilities at Woody Point, including a Post and Telegraph Office, general stores, a bakery, a butcher and a garage. The St Leonard's Hotel opened in 1883 (now the site of Palace Hotel), and the Belvedere Hotel opened in 1901. Boarding houses such as Lorneleigh, Bay View House, and Cambridge House were also built to cater for holiday makers. Fishing was a popular pastime, both from the jetty and along the beaches, and oyster leases provided produce for a local oyster factory. By 1902 "buses and wagonettes" were travelling between Woody Point and Redcliffe.

Another local pastime was sailing, and from 1884 an annual regatta took place. From 1938, with the exception of war years, the Humpybong Yacht Club has also conducted sailing activities on Bramble Bay. Celebrations following sailing events were held in the Woody Point Memorial School of Arts after its construction, and the Yacht Club also organized regular fund-raising dances in the hall.

The movement to erect a school of arts at Woody Point was underway by 1909. In March that year the Woody Point Progress Association was formed, and in October 1910 the Redcliffe Shire Council forwarded a plan to the Department of Public Lands for half an acre of land, sought for a school of arts by the Progress Association. A School of Arts Reserve (223) was surveyed off Reserve 358 in 1911, but the actual desired site was further southeast; and the current school of arts site was surveyed in February 1912. A Reserve for a School of Arts, Woody Point, Portion 231, of 2 roods (22,000 sq ft; 2,000 m^{2}), was notified in the Queensland Government Gazette on 18 May 1912.

Schools of arts were a principal source of learning and instruction for Queensland adults in the 19th century and early 20th century when state secondary education was almost non-existent. Schools of arts and mechanics' institutes emerged from a wider social movement of popular education and self-improvement in 19th century industrial Britain, and the school of arts movement found a fertile field in 19th century Queensland. Community organised and financed, these associations were the forerunners of government-funded libraries and technical colleges.

Mechanics' institutes were formed initially to improve the education of working men and instruct them in various trades. Later their aims broadened and the institutes became a popular agency of adult education in general. Access to books by borrowing as subscribers provided an important educational and recreational service. The first mechanics' institute was established in London in 1824; the first mechanics' institute in Australia was established in Hobart in 1827, while the first mechanics' institute in Queensland was formed at Brisbane in 1849. In Australia, mechanics' institutes became known as schools of arts, reflecting a broader mix of educational, cultural and social roles, and the increasing influence of the middle classes in the movement. The provision of adult education, including formal classes in practical skills, was an important function of these "schools", but less formal activities such as debating, amateur dramatics, and the provision of a subscription library and reading room, were also encouraged.

As towns and districts were settled, local committees were formed to establish a school of arts with the aim to "promote moral, social and intellectual growth for the community". Schools of arts established in rural districts often served a wider community purpose than those established in urban areas. Whereas every school of arts established a library as part of their charter, the rural school of arts was likely to serve an equally important function as a public hall and as a focus for district identity. To 1880, only 26 schools of arts had been established in Queensland towns, although the government encouraged the construction of schools of arts by subsidising local fund-raising efforts. The movement grew rapidly during the 1880s and 1890s; so that by federation almost every town and settlement in the colony included a school of arts, or at least a reading room.

The typical school of arts was a timber building consisting of a public hall and two or three rooms for a subscription library, reading room or meeting room. In larger provincial centres, substantial masonry structures were erected. Although schools of arts buildings varied greatly in size, materials and style, a common element was that they were readily identifiable within the townscape. As a group, these buildings were important as symbols of progress and evidence of civilising forces at work. The construction of a school of arts in a particular community was seen as a sign that that community had "come of age".

Fund-raising for the Woody Point School of Arts had begun in 1911, with a function in the Redcliffe Hall, and in March 1912 a musical evening was held at "Evonsleigh", the home of Martin, in aid of the Woody Point School of Arts, with over 70 persons present. Enthusiastic residents and committee members raised funds amounting to between £80 and £90 by the outbreak of World War I. At this point fund- raising ceased, and the money was placed in the name of the School of Arts committee in the Government Savings Bank.

At the end of the war, planning for a school of arts was recommenced. In July 1920 a meeting was called to form a committee to take forward the construction of a suitable building. HR Sykes was elected president, John Henry Cox, Hon. Secretary and W Henderson, Hon. Treasurer, together with a committee of seven others. Around this time locals thought that the building would form a suitable World War I memorial. On 22 November 1920 the wish of the committee to "make the institution a patriotic one was given effect at a special public meeting when rule 1 was amended to read "the institution shall be known as the Woody Point Memorial School of Arts"". The new name was adopted locally from this time but was only given official approval by the Department of Public Instruction in September 1925.

Like all Australian communities, Woody Point was affected by the impact of World War I. Of the 330,770 Australians who embarked for overseas service in World War I, 58,961 died and 170,909 were wounded, went missing or became prisoners of war. This meant that around 69% of embarked personnel became casualties – or 21% of eligible Australian males. To date, no previous or subsequent war has had such an impact on Australia in terms of loss of life; almost every community in every Australian state lost young people. Even before the end of hostilities, memorials were being erected by Australian communities to honour local people who had served and died. These memorials were a spontaneous and highly visible expression of national grief; substitute graves for the Australians whose bodies lay in battlefield cemeteries in Europe and the Middle East.

World War I memorials took a variety of forms in Australia, including honour boards (from 1915), stone monuments (including obelisks, soldier statues, arches, crosses, columns or urns), tree-lined memorial avenues, memorial parks, and utilitarian structures such as gates, halls and clocks. In Queensland the soldier statue was the most popular choice of monument, while the obelisk predominated in southern states. Australia's first permanent World War I memorial to honour the men from a particular community was unveiled at Balmain in Sydney on 23 April 1916.

The argument over whether a war memorial should simply be a monument, or have a utilitarian function (the sacred versus the useful), was repeated all over Australia. The utilitarians believed that their approach was more enlightened and humane, and utility also appealed to local governments, as donations could offset the cost of needed infrastructure. However, monumentalists argued that utilitarian solutions were at the mercy of progress and would become outmoded over time. Monumentalists also believed that it was not really "commemoration", if a public resource that should have been built anyway was named a memorial. Post-World War I, most Australian localities decided on a monumental approach (60%), with only 22% choosing utilitarian buildings (mostly halls) and 18% choosing the compromise position of utilitarian monuments. Some communities solved the problem by building two memorials: one utilitarian, and one monumental. After World War II (WWII) the utilitarian form of memorial increased in popularity.

Memorial halls were an expensive form of utilitarian memorial, but banks were more ready to lend the money for projects with a commercial value; and subscribers knew they were providing a public resource as well as a memorial. Halls were also a common preference of the Returned Sailors and Soldiers Imperial League of Australia (RSSILA), as they provided an amenity for returned soldiers; although some feared that using the halls for entertainment would be disrespectful of the memorial purpose. Although the halls were for the use of returned soldiers, they also served multiple community functions. Early Queensland World War I memorial halls were opened in December 1919 (Coolangatta – a Methodist Memorial Hall and Soldiers' Rest) and January 1920 (Pilton).

Outside Victoria, no state governments made direct grants for local World War I memorials except for the building of halls, hospitals and schools which were eligible for public money whether or not they were memorials. Federal assistance could include providing funds for employing returned soldiers for preparation of memorial sites; but no other assistance occurred until the Entertainments Tax Assessment Act 1916 was amended in 1924 to exempt functions held for the erection, maintenance or furnishing of war memorial halls. From 1927, payers of Federal income tax could also deduct gifts over £1 for construction or maintenance of public war memorials. However, by this time two thirds of the nation's World War I memorials had already been built. Fund-raising for local war memorials was thus a voluntary community effort, as was the case at Woody Point.

Memorial schools of art form a distinct sub-group of utilitarian war memorials, separate from memorial halls, in that they combine the educational mission of the school of arts movement with the utilitarian war memorial movement. Although they usually included a hall, they also included the library and reading room found in a typical school of arts building. The first memorial schools of arts in Queensland opened at Bald Hills (August 1920) and Caboolture (September 1920). Other early memorial schools of arts include Wooroolin (1921); and Kumbia, Elimbah and Woody Point, (all 1922). Some memorial schools of arts were established in pre-World War I halls or schools of arts buildings, such as at Cooran and Cooroy (both 1926), and Southport (1939). The majority of identified Queensland memorial school of arts buildings were of timber construction, but some used brick or concrete, including Wooroolin, Clayfield (1925), Morningside (1926), Innisfail (1930), and Pittsworth (1930). Demolished memorial schools of arts include Caboolture, Southport, Banyo (1925), Clifton (1926), Goodna (1927), Kedron (1928), and Bulimba (built by 1938).

There were some delays in the construction of the Woody Point Memorial School of Arts, in part due to fund-raising efforts for the tree-lined, bitumen-covered Anzac Memorial Avenue – the other utilitarian World War I memorial (opened in 1925) on the Redcliffe Peninsula. All but 30 stumps of the Memorial School of Arts were capped in December 1920, but the last stumps were not capped until November 1921, by returned soldiers. The Redcliffe sub-branch of the RSSILA, formed in 1920, actively assisted with the raising of the necessary capital for the building with various functions including afternoon teas, fetes, socials and dances (later the Woody Point Memorial School of Arts became the meeting place of the sub-branch). By December 1921 about £800 had been raised. The Commercial Bank of Australia had agreed to finance the scheme on securities given by seven Woody Point citizens, but sometime after the first stump capping this was changed to a private guarantee by JH Cox. As well as funds, practical items such as cups and saucers were donated.

Tenders were received by 24 September 1921. These ranged from £1000 to £1400. On the advice of the architect, Hubert Thomas, the tender of Messrs F and A Pitfield was accepted. HGO Thomas (1857–1922) immigrated to Brisbane from Wales in 1883. He practised as an architect in his own right from c.1885, and from 1898 onwards he lived and practiced at Sandgate, where he served on the local School of Arts Committee. Specialising in urban villas, Thomas became a Member of the Society of Architects, London, in 1904, and a Fellow of the Queensland Institute of Architects c.1910. He was the founder of the St David's Society in Brisbane (extant by 1918), and was its president at the time of his death on the night of 1–2 March 1922, after the annual dinner of the society – two days before the Woody Point Memorial School of Arts was officially opened. Examples of his work include a villa in Hendra for Edward Jones, 1888–89 (`Dura', later `Glengariff') (Glengariff); the Bank of North Queensland, Childers, c.1900 (National Australia Bank); and 1919 additions to the Queen Alexandra Home in Coorparoo (Queen Alexandra Home).

The building he designed at Woody Point consisted of a hall 30 feet (9.1 m) wide x 50 feet (15 m) long, plus a stage area 30 feet (9.1 m) wide by 15 feet (4.6 m) long. Small wings on either side of the raised stage each contained a room 12 feet (3.7 m) wide by 15 feet (4.6 m) long. Verandas on each side of the hall, south of the wings, accessed both the main hall and each wing, and there was an entrance porch on the southeast (front) elevation. Decorative battens (no longer extant) ornamented the front gable and the smaller porch gable; three roof ventilators (not extant) were located along the ridge, and a large flagpole stood in front of the entrance (since replaced by a smaller version). Originally, there were also timber fences either side of the hall. At some stage the front elevation of the hall was stuccoed.

On 4 October 1921, the President of the committee, FW Whitehouse, and the Secretary, JH Cox, were authorized to have the building erected before Christmas. The contractors pushed on with the work and it was completed and handed over on 21 December 1921. It was originally intended to open the building on 26 January 1922, but this clashed with the schedule of the Queensland Governor, Sir Matthew Nathan. The opening was delayed so that he could open new jetties at Redcliffe and Woody Point on the same day as the Memorial School of Arts.

The Governor officially opened the Woody Point Memorial School of Arts, and unveiled its honour board, on the afternoon of 4 March 1922, following the inspection of a guard of honour provided by local returned servicemen. The honour board was made from a single plank of seasoned red cedar by John Storie Jnr. This board hangs in the hall, and lists the names of 94 servicemen who enlisted from the peninsula (of whom seven died), along with three "war workers". The board was supposedly to be displayed with a captured German machine gun, allotted to the town as a war trophy.

The decision on whom to name on a war memorial varied across Australia. While some only listed the dead, many also listed those who returned from service. War memorial committees were also lobbied to consider including people who missed the war for various reasons, including munitions workers. Three workers were listed on the Woody Point Honour Board; John Tebby, George Carpenter and CD Skene. In March 1919, The Queenslander newspaper reported the return of a contingent of 69 Queensland munition workers who had arrived home from Great Britain. The report stated the contingent comprised men who were ineligible for military service but had volunteered to undertake suitable war work. John Tebby and G. Carpenter were included among the list of the returned. CD Skene's (the other listed name) involvement in the war has not been verified. Charles Donaldson Skene, (a builder and contractor who died at age 69 in 1929) became a trustee for the Memorial School of Arts and according to his obituary played a major role in its establishment.

The Governor spoke at length about the library in the building, and the pleasures of reading. In 1922 the library had nearly 600 volumes; by 1923 it had 900 volumes, and the reading room was "well stocked with papers and periodicals". By 1931 there were 2035 books.

The Minister for Public Instruction, John Huxham, was also present at the opening ceremony. He had apparently promised to provide a government subsidy for the fund-raising, at a rate of 10 shillings to the pound, but if this ever occurred, it was not mentioned at the opening. The "Brisbane Courier" newspaper simply noted that the Memorial School of Arts had been "built by public subscription as a memorial to the fallen soldiers of Humpybong". The opening ceremony was followed by afternoon tea and a ball was held in the hall that evening.

At the time of opening there was still a debt of £500. Although it was made a requirement of the original allocation of land by the Department of Public Lands in 1912, it was only in August 1923 that the initial group of trustees was nominated and ratified by the Department of Lands – Robert Train; Errol Henry Cowen; Charles Donaldson Skene; John Elliott and JH Cox.

By November 1923 almost £1600 had been spent on the hall, and £100 was still owed. The debt on the Memorial School of Arts was cleared in 1924. At this time returned soldiers paid 1 shilling per annum for membership, and O'Neill was the librarian. In 1927, membership of the Memorial School of Arts was available for 10 shillings per annum or 3 shillings a quarter. By this stage the library, still run by O'Neill, was open on Tuesday and Thursday 7–9 pm, and on Saturday 3–5 pm.

In 1928, alterations to the hall were carried out to enable movies to be shown. A bio-box (projection room) was constructed above the front entrance gable, as shown in photographs of the hall from this period. Talking pictures arrived on 27 September 1930, and were shown until 1937. The movies, according to advertisements in the local paper, were invariably followed by a dance. These dances were accompanied by a Victor piano bought for £135 by the committee, initially for silent movies.

With the opening of the Hornibrook Highway Toll Bridge in October 1935, residential development increased, along with the number of holiday makers, and more use was made of the Woody Point foreshore to pitch tents during the Christmas period. A bathing pavilion, designed by architect CE Plant, was built in 1937 opposite the Memorial School of Arts. During the Christmas period, when camping was popular around the peninsula, entertainment in the hall was a nightly affair.

By the late 1930s management of the hall by the trustees had declined in quality from previous years. A subsequent review by the Brisbane Land Agent on behalf of the Lands Administration Board recommended that the original gazettal be cancelled and the land re-gazetted under the trusteeship of the Redcliffe Town Council (established 1921). The Council having agreed to accept the trusteeship in 1938, it was gazetted as trustees in October 1943. At this time the land was re-gazetted as a "Soldiers Memorial Hall Reserve" (R983).

On 26 June 1943, as requested by the council, the name of the hall was altered by the Department of Lands to Woody Point War Memorial Hall. The school of arts function ceased, the library closed and its books were transferred to form the nucleus of the council library. According to relevant by-laws gazetted on 8 May 1948, a management committee became responsible for the running of the hall.

Over time, a number of repairs and additions were made to the building. Minor repairs and refurbishment, for example, painting and roof repairs, were on-going. These often required fund-raising efforts to cover costs. An instance of this was an advertisement, for donations to buy bricks, which appeared in the "Redcliffe Herald" of April 1944. The brick fence (not extant) constructed at the front of the hall from this fund-raising effort was still visible in a photograph of the Hall taken in 1993. In 1952, the Memorial Hall was the only public hall on the peninsula.

In the 1950s, extensions, financed by Redcliffe Town Council, lengthened the hall by 25 feet (7.6 m) to the northwest (stage end); to a new total length of 90 feet (27 m). The extensions, which were carried out by Bird at a cost of £1800, were officially opened on 5 March 1955. The Council paid for the new stage to be levelled and raised in November 1958 at a cost of £95. During the 1950s, the Eildon Croquet Club opened to the north of the hall, and part of the club extends onto the Memorial Hall Reserve.

By January 1964 toilets were installed in the western wing of the hall, replacing detached toilets located just northwest of the building. A small extension on the south side of the western wing, which now holds an accessible toilet, was built between 1964 and 1969. In February 1967 the reserve was re-gazetted with an area of 1 rood 39.4 perches (2,010 m^{2}).

While the hall changed its appearance over the years, it continued to be used by the community. The RSSILA, which later became the Returned Sailors, Soldiers and Airmens Imperial League of Australia (RSSAILA) and is now called the Returned and Services League (RSL), held its monthly meetings in the hall until its own dedicated premises was completed in 1954. Anzac Day ceremonies have been a familiar event in the hall since its inception and even when the ceremony was moved to the Pier Theatre in the 1950s, the luncheon to conclude the day was held in the hall. Over the years, social functions have been held in the hall, for instance the RSSAILA 1949 Christmas Party for the children of Ex-Servicemen. In 2014 the RSL continue to conduct formal Anzac Day and Remembrance Day ceremonies in the hall, in which the honour board plays a significant role.

The hall also hosted events for the Harmony Club, which was established in 1939 shortly before the start of World War II by and W Begg, who were closely involved with the Woody Point Hall Committee. This Club held weekly dances and entertainment in the hall. During the war, the Club conducted Farewell Evenings for locals leaving to join the Forces and as time went by Welcome Home celebrations for returning servicemen. Service personnel based close by and those recuperating on the peninsula often attended the weekly dance in the hall. This Club continued to conduct dances until the 1950s.

During World War II, the monthly meeting of the Welfare Work Circle of the Women's National Emergency League (WNEL) was held in the library room in the Memorial Hall, where they made camouflage netting and woollen gloves, socks and balaclavas for British bomb victims during their working meetings. This same group held fund-raisers in the hall during the war years with the first of these being advertised as "Petticoat Lane" in 1941. The library was still in use during the early war years when the Welfare Work Circle made use of its room.

Local people indicate the importance of this hall in the social life of the area. The local community members speak fondly, the older ones alerently, on the broad range of activities held in the hall, which became very much a part of their lives. They talk of it as having a "sense of place" in the area's social memory. Some examples of organisations which have used the hall include: the Order of the Eastern Star; Royal Antediluvian Order of Buffaloes; Redcliffe Musical Arts Society; Redcliffe Eisteddfod Committee; Redcliffe Youth Club, Redcliffe Marching Girls, and the Indoor Bowls Club. The Humpybong Yacht Club, the Woody Point and Clontarf Progress Association, the Queensland Country Women's Association, Redcliffe Citizens Cultural Club, and the Pensioners League held monthly meetings in the hall. In addition, local dance schools made use of the hall, including the Sylvena School of Dancing (later became the Sharon Alback Dance School); and the Sylvia Curie Dance School. Alan and Pat Boulton still hold modern dance classes in the hall every Friday evening.

During the Christmas school holidays, church services were held in the hall to cater for those campers who came regularly to the peninsula to stay in the tent cities which sprang up around Woody Point and Clontarf. Local election campaigns, such as those of Joe Grant in 1922, and Joe Grice in 1939, were also launched in the hall. In 1924, the Redcliffe Town Council met in the hall on the last Tuesday of each month. Frank Nicklin, a Queensland Premier, spoke at the hall in his State election campaign. During World War II it was a distribution point for ration cards. It has served, and continues to serve, as a voting booth for all elections. Wrestling and boxing events have also been held in the hall. Music appreciation classes were being held there as late as the 1990s. Some of the hall's tenants utilized the stage and its dressing rooms to perform plays and musical theatre. In addition, the hall has been used for many fund-raising events; for example, the Cancer campaign with a "Dark Night" Masquerade Ball. The Redcliffe Historical Society used the hall for fund-raisers; and fetes aimed at fund-raising have occurred, while card parties have been held during the years. Local schools have also made regular use of the hall for balls and concerts.

In 2014 permanent bookings are held by the Bethesda Baptist Church; Margate, Woody Point and Clontarf Pensioners League; AA Volunteers; Legal Aid; Healing and Reconciliation outreach. The hall is used regularly for dancing groups and classes - as it apparently had the best dance floor on the peninsula - and for social occasions such as birthday parties and wedding receptions. The Lions Club of Kippa-Ring acts as caretaker.

The hall continues to serve as an enduring and well-used war memorial and multi-purpose community venue into the 21st century. As at 2017, it is owned and operated by the Moreton Bay Regional Council.

== Description ==
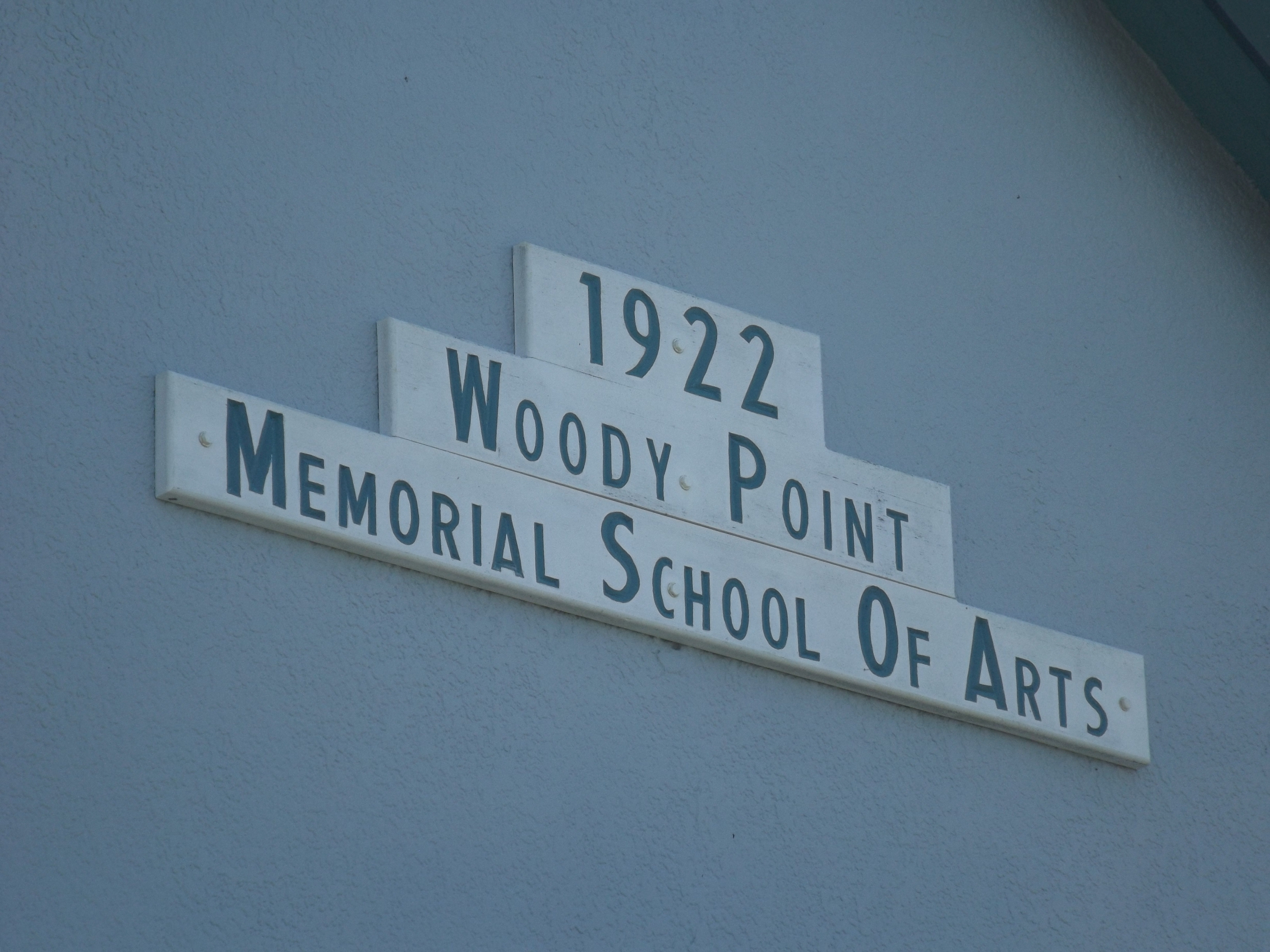
Signage, 2016

The former Woody Point Memorial School of Arts stands on a 2,008 square metres (21,610 sq ft) wedge-shaped allotment on the corner of Hornibrook Esplanade and Oxley Avenue in Woody Point. It is a modest building at the southern end of a fenced yard, facing south to the street intersection.

The T-shaped building is a low-set, one-storey, timber-framed structure, comprising a large hall at the front and a stage with projecting side wings at the rear. It is clad with timber chamferboards, the boards of the front facade are stuccoed with a rough render. The hip and gable roof is clad with corrugated metal sheets. The two periods of construction (1921 and 1955) are discernible; the original, front part is set on short concrete posts with a timber battened perimeter skirt and the later, back part is set on concrete perimeter walls.

The front of the hall is symmetrical, featuring a gable with a bargeboard supported by decorative timber brackets. The entrance is central, sheltered under a gable roofed porch. A flagpole stands near the front, centred on the elevation. Either side of the front porch are windows with decorative timber hoods. These have modern aluminium- framed sliding sashes below original timber-framed fanlights.

Along both sides of the hall are further windows with timber hoods. The projecting wings generally have aluminium-framed, sliding sash windows. On either side of the building is a timber-framed deck providing access to the hall interior via original timber braced and board double doors with glazed fanlights. Across the rear elevation is a timber-framed verandah providing access to the back of the stage. The rear elevation has a door to the understorey.

Entered from the front porch via double timber board doors, the hall is a large, well-proportioned space with a high coved ceiling. It has a timber floor and v-jointed timber board walls to plate rail height, above which the walls are clad with sheet material with timber cover strips. The ceiling at the front of the hall is lined with v-jointed timber boards, changing to sheet material and timber cover strips for the remainder. Adjacent to the front door are timber cupboards.

Mounted on the northeast wall of the hall is a timber World War I honour board. It features decorative timber mouldings, including a curved and scrolled timber top with painted crossed Australian and British flags. It lists servicemen and war workers.

Under the raised stage floor is a storage area accessible from the hall. A proscenium arch is flanked by doors onto the stage reached via timber stairs and a timber board door opens from the stage into the wings on both sides. The layout of the wings comprises a change room and a large, modern kitchen in the eastern wing and toilets, a small store room and a change room in the western wing. The kitchen and bathroom fitouts are modern and are not of cultural heritage significance.

At the northern end of the hall grounds part of the adjacent croquet club's building extends into the heritage boundary, this is not of cultural heritage significance.
