= National Australia Bank (disambiguation) =

The National Australia Bank is an Australian bank.

National Australia Bank may also refer to the following bank buildings:

- National Australia Bank (180 Queen Street), a heritage-listed former bank building in Brisbane, Queensland
- National Australia Bank (308 Queen Street), a heritage-listed bank building in Brisbane, Queensland
- National Australia Bank, Childers, a heritage-listed bank building in Childers, Bundaberg Region, Queensland
- National Australia Bank building, Dubbo, a heritage-listed former bank building in Dubbo, New South Wales
- NAB House, Hobart, Tasmania
