= Tunley =

Tunley may refer to:

- Tunley (surname)
- Tunley, Somerset, in Camerton
- Tunley, Gloucestershire, in Oakridge
- Tunley Camp, an Iron Age hill fort in Camerton, Somerset, England
