= Glengariff, Hendra =

Glengariff
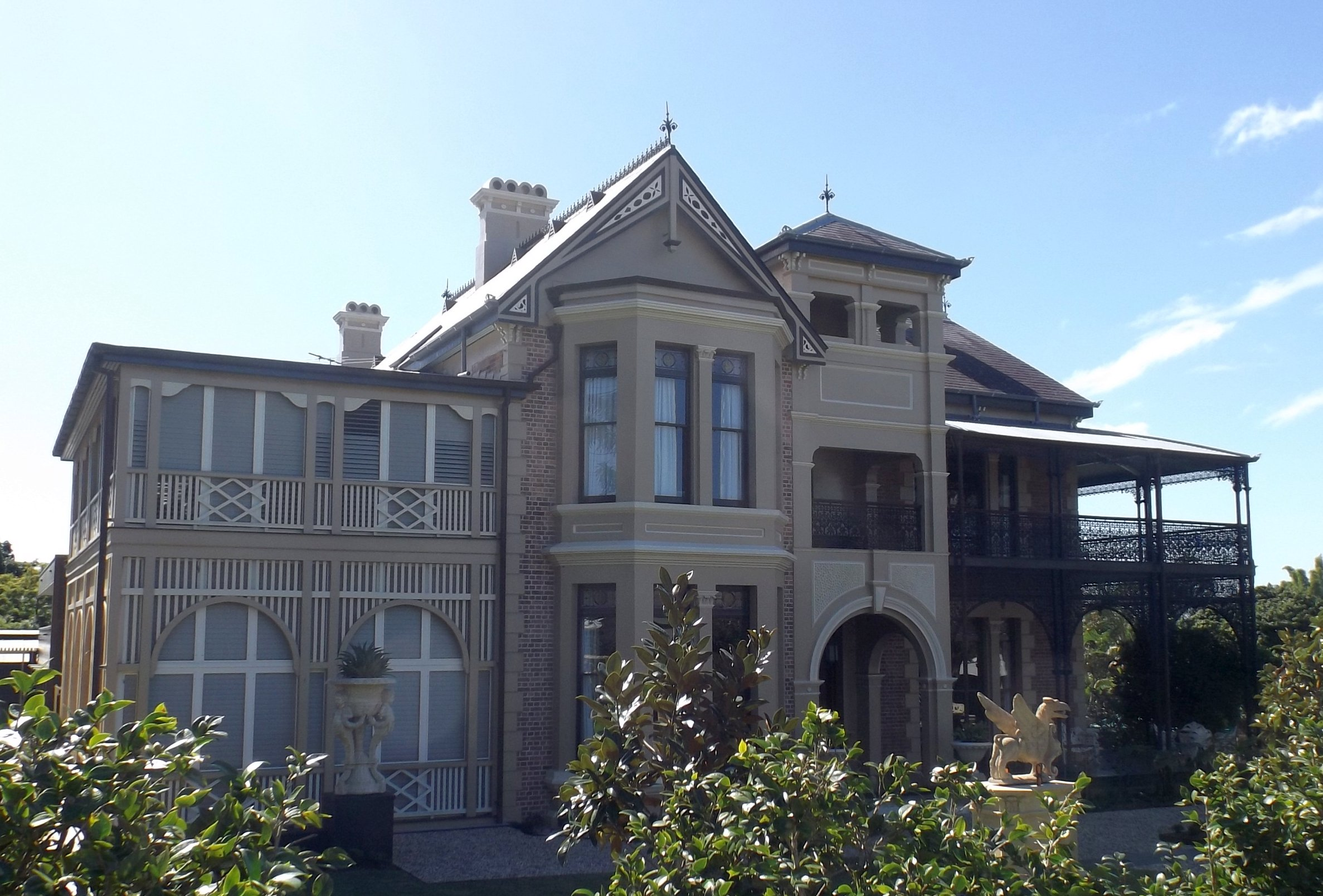
- Building in 2015

- Location within Queensland Location within Australia
- 27.42°S 153.0685°E
- Location: 5 Derby Street, Hendra, City of Brisbane, Queensland, Australia

History
- Design period: 1970s–1990s (late 20th century)
- Built: 1888–1889

Site notes
- Architect(s): Robin Dods, Hubert George Octavius Thomas

Queensland Heritage Register
- Official name: Glengariff, Dura, Glenaplin
- Type: state heritage (built, landscape)
- Designated: 21 August 1992
- Reference no.: 600222
- Significant period: 1880s–1950s (fabric); 1880s, 1898–1970s (historical)
- Significant components: lead light/s, tank – water (underground), driveway, service wing, tower – observation/lookout, residential accommodation – main house, trees/plantings, garden/grounds

Glengariff is a heritage-listed villa at 5 Derby Street, Hendra, City of Brisbane, Queensland, Australia. It was designed by Hubert George Octavius Thomas, with 1907 alterations by Robin Dods, and built from 1888 to 1889. It is also known as Dura and Glenaplin. It was added to the Queensland Heritage Register on 21 August 1992.

== History ==
Glengariff (then called Dura) was erected in 1888–89 for bank manager Edward Jones by architect Hubert George Octavius Thomas. The site consisting of some 19 blocks (described as sections 87–105 of allotment 16 portion 2) totally nearly 5 acres (2.0 ha) was acquired by Jones in 1886 from the Queensland Turf Club. Located a short distance to the north of the Eagle Farm Racecourse, it had formed part of the original grant made in 1863 of over 300 acres (120 ha) to the Turf Club to enable the club to re-establish its racecourse, then at New Farm, at Eagle Farm. To overcome financial difficulties, parts of the original grant were sold off by the club; the first subdivisions (of a number of 4–5 acres (1.6–2.0 ha) blocks) occurred in 1878. The Glengariff holding formed part of a second subdivision of some 180 blocks in the area roughly bound by Manson, Zillman, Gerler, and Nudgee Roads; street names such as Derby Street (after races, racecourses, and Turf Club trustees) alluding to the area's turf origins.

The 1880s was a period of great economic prosperity in Queensland – no better evidenced than the resulting building boom which transformed the central business districts of many of the state's towns. In the suburbs of Brisbane, that prosperity was also evidenced in the substantial villa residences erected by the princes of the commercial world. In the midst of the boom, the Commercial Bank of Australia (established in Melbourne in 1866) opened its Brisbane branch in 1886 with Edward Jones as its manager. The Hendra site selected by Jones for his own suburban villa was somewhat unlikely, possessing neither elevation nor proximity to the river. It did however have proximity to the state's premier racecourse and to the recently opened Sandgate / City Railway line (via Hendra railway station). A number of other substantial houses had also been erected in the vicinity including:

- Stanley Hall and Ralahyne (1888) in Enderley Road
- W H Heckelman's two story residence Friendenthal erected 1886–67 on Nudgee Road (architect Andrea Stombuco)
- James Clark's substantial timber residence Dunsinane erected in 1892 on Manson Rd (architect George Henry Male Addison).

The two-storey masonry Dura was located to the southern (most elevated) part of the site with views from the upper floor of the surrounding district; the tower with its view to the south presumably providing a lookout to the Racecourse – a feature known to have been included for this purpose in additions to the nearby Stanley Hall undertaken in 1888–89 by architect G. H. M. Addison for racing aficionado Hubert Hunter. A contemporary lithograph (which shows Dura prior to the 1907 Dods additions) shows a two-story bay to the western elevation (matching the two story bay to the southern elevation) with a hipped roof running back to the main roof. It is not known whether this was actually built or if it was removed to accommodate the later addition of the Dods verandahs. To the north of this bay, the lithograph also shows windows at both levels with continuous hoods in place of the enclosed verandahs which now exist.

Described in 1888 by the Aldine History of Queensland as one of the rising young architects of the city, Welsh architect Hubert George Octavius Thomas (1857–1922) arrived in Brisbane in 1883 practising in his own right from c. 1885. After his marriage in 1898, Thomas lived and practised at Sandgate; his work there including a band stand at Moore Park (demolished), extensive alterations and additions to Howrah (later Blue Waters) as well as the removal and rebuilding of the Wesleyan Church (which Thomas attended) and the building of the parsonage. In 1903 Thomas moved his office back to the city. Other works include his own house, Rheidol, a single-story stylistic relative to Dura erected c. 1889 at Montague Road, South Brisbane (demolished); a house for his father-in-law William Lee (1896–1897) at Wooloongabba; and possibly his later house at Wooloowin, Nanteos. Thomas may also have been responsible for additions to Cintra House in 1888. A founder and President of the St David's Society in Brisbane, Thomas died in 1922. Thomas is said to have specialised in suburban villas of which Dura/Glengariff would appear to be his most substantial.

Edward Jones did not however reside at Dura for long; by 1892 he is no longer listed in the Queensland Post Office Directories. It appears however that the house (recorded by the 1895 McKellar's Map as Glen Aplin) was rented to the manager of the Queensland National Bank (DG Stuart) until about the time when acquired by T C Beirne and his family in 1898.

Thomas Charles Beirne (1860–1949) arrived in Australia from Ireland in 1884. Together with Irish contemporaries M. D. Piggott (with whom Beirne established his first store at South Brisbane in 1886) and F. J. McDonnell, T. C. Beirne was to found a fortune based on the burgeoning retail trade which saw the transformation of small nineteenth century draper's stores into the large department stores of the twentieth century. Beirne's own fortunes became closely aligned with that of Fortitude Valley where (after the dissolution of his partnership in 1891 with M. D. Piggott), Beirne established his store. (Pigott later established Piggott's Department Store in Toowoomba.) Beirne's store grew over the succeeding decades to become Queensland's leading departmental store, making the once unfashionable Fortitude Valley into Brisbane's principal shopping area. Other stores were also to be established at Ipswich (1892) and Mackay (1902). A successful businessman (with extensive interests in the Brisbane Tramway Company, the Australian Mutual Provident Society, Queensland Trustees, Atlas Assurance Company, and the British Australian Cotton Association), Beirne was appointed to the Queensland Legislative Council in 1905, and elected to the Council of the University of Queensland in 1927, becoming warden from 1928 to 1941. In 1935 he donated £20,000 to establish the TC Beirne School of Law. A devout Roman Catholic and close friend and confidant of Archbishop James Duhig (1871–1965), Beirne was also a prominent benefactor of the church including Duhig's grandiose scheme for the building of the Holy Name Cathedral in Brisbane; the architect for which and many other Duhig projects, Jack Hennessy, junior, was to marry one of the Beirne daughters. In 1929 he was awarded a papal knighthood of the Order of St Gregory. At his death in 1949 The Courier-Mail commented that Brisbane has lost a personality whose life has been woven strongly into its own progress and development for half a century.

As TC Beirne's Fortitude Valley store was to be central to the public expression of the man so Glengariff (as the Beirnes renamed Dura) was to his private life: the Australian Dictionary of Biography describing his pastimes as mainly connected with his family life (he and his wife Ann Kavanagh had ten children, five daughters surviving infancy) and his home, Glengariff, at Hendra, with its beautiful grounds, tennis and croquet courts. What prompted the move to Glengariff is not known: prior to the purchase of Glengariff the family are not believed to have owned their own home: leasing a property at Moray Street, New Farm and earlier living above the Brunswick Street store. By this time, however, Beirne was established as a successful businessman; moreover just prior to purchasing Glengariff there was much illness in the family with a baby boy dying from pneumonia and TC Beirne himself suffering from typhoid fever. The semi-rural Glengariff may have appeared the answer.

In his memoirs, TC (as he was known) recalled inspecting the property with his wife in whose name the property was acquired:

The house was a large two-storied building standing in five acres of land, the lower portion of which was under water. It was the home of water birds, such as the ibis, and the call of the curlew and the croaking of the frogs made it a very eerie place. The house itself had a look of utter neglect about it, and the garden was completely overgrown with giant bamboos, making it almost impossible to see the house from the road ... Mother, having viewed the house from every angle, turned to me and said, "What a beautiful home it will make!"

On moving in, the bamboos were cleared away from the house but a lovely line of bunya pines along the west side (which remain today) was left; a large portion of the land was ploughed and crops of pineapples and rosellas, and lucerne for the cows were grown. To the east of the house was a tennis court and after becoming a fan of croquet TC had a croquet lawn constructed adjoining Goodwood Street.

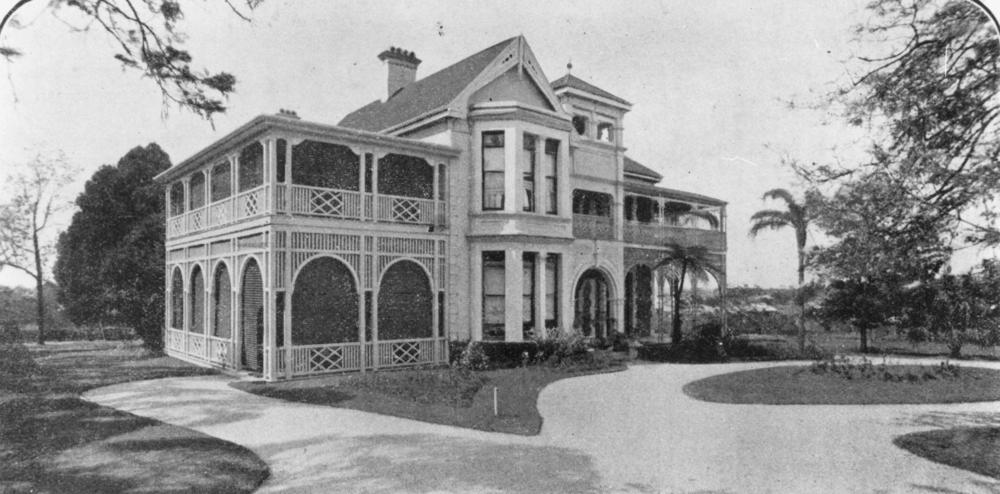
Glengariff, 1923

In 1923 the Queensland Society Magazine (November 1923 p23) published photographs showing sweeping gravel paths including a circular drive to the front of the house, the entrance hall (by which time the stair which physical evidence suggests may have been moved is in its existing position), the double archwayed drawing room containing many art treasures, and dining room. On the upper level were some five bedrooms and separate quarters for the staff. A timber garage was erected sometime after 1908 on Ascot Street (now Burilda Street) after fire destroyed the stables (located to the north of the house). An undated sewerage detail plan also shows the circular brick underground water tank located to the north of the house (which remains in existence).

In 1907 architect Robin Dods (1868–1920) of the firm Hall & Dods undertook additions to Glengariff costing £496. Dods had previously undertaken work for Thomas Charles Beirne and their relationship was to be longstanding: Hall & Dods undertook several stages of building to the Fortitude Valley store and warehousing (1902–13) and the building of new stores at Ipswich (1902; additions 1909) and Mackay (1907). Dods also designed a house at Albion (c. 1912) for the eldest Beirne daughter.

Dods' work at Glengariff included the addition of double storeyed verandah rooms to the western side of the house and the building in of cupboards in the dining room. The use of weatherboard and the detailing employed would also suggest that Dods was responsible for alterations and / or additions to the rear service part of the house (including enclosing of the existing verandah to the rear of the western side on two levels with weatherboard). The articulation of the main stair may have been altered at this time. Dods had a highly developed architectural imagination: his introduction of the formal and philosophical ideas of both the British Arts and Crafts movement and Edwardian classicism and his significant functional solutions to the problems of living and building in Queensland combined to achieve an architectural revolution in Brisbane. In his domestic work, Dods reassessed local timber construction refining familiar elements including the planning and detailing of verandahs. Dods work at Glengariff is typical: the addition of timber verandahs (expanded in size to become outdoor rooms) on the western side offered protection from the western sun as well as permitting a flexibility of use including as a ball-room (on the ground level) and outside sleeping quarters (on the upper level). The Edwardian concerns for light and ventilation (which were central to Dods' own work) linked to the health of the mind and body, which found their high point in the open air wards for treatment of infectious diseases such as tuberculosis (several being designed by Dods for the Brisbane General Hospital) and Queensland's open air schools are clearly in evidence in Dods' work at Glengariff.

After the death of their mother (in 1940) and father (in 1949) the five Beirne daughters gifted Glengariff to the church as an episcopal residence. T. C. Beirne's longstanding friend Archbishop James Duhig offered it to his newly appointed Coadjutor Archbishop, Patrick Mary O'Donnell. Contemporaneously more than half of the original Glengariff holding (lots 91–101) fronting Gerler Road became a municipal park, TC Beirne Park. Changes undertaken by the Church include the removal of a lift (installed by TC Beirne for use by his wife); the installation of Archbishop O'Donnell's coat of arms above the front door and fireplace in the drawing room (which remain) and the replacing of the timber entrance gates (located near the corner of Burilda and Derby Streets) and paling fence with chain wire. Glengariff was to remain Archbishop O'Donnell's home even after the death of James Duhig in 1965 when he became Archbishop; he chose not to move to Wynberg, the residence purchased by Duhig in 1925 as the Archbishop's residence after the demolition of Dara to make way for the building of Duhig's most ambitious building project the ill-fated Holy Name Cathedral. After the death of Archbishop O'Donnell, his secretary (and previously secretary to Archbishop Duhig) Rev Father Francis Douglas remained in residence until his death after which it was sold by the church in 1985.

More recently a number of changes have been made to the house and grounds including the repositioning of the kitchen from the rear service wing to one room of the drawing room, the formation of a terrace to the rear of the new kitchen, with garage below, and the building of a new tennis court to the north of the house. Some changes have also apparently been made to the upstairs bedrooms and rear service wing including refitting of bathrooms. In 1993 roughly half of the remaining holding (lots 102–105) which previously contained the croquet and tennis courts to the east of the house were sold and a number of new houses erected. That land no longer forms part of heritage listing.

The house was bought privately in 1999. Major renovations and extensions to the property have been made. In recent time the house has been returned to its historic state. The gardens of the house have been transformed with statues and the introduction of a fountain.

== Description ==
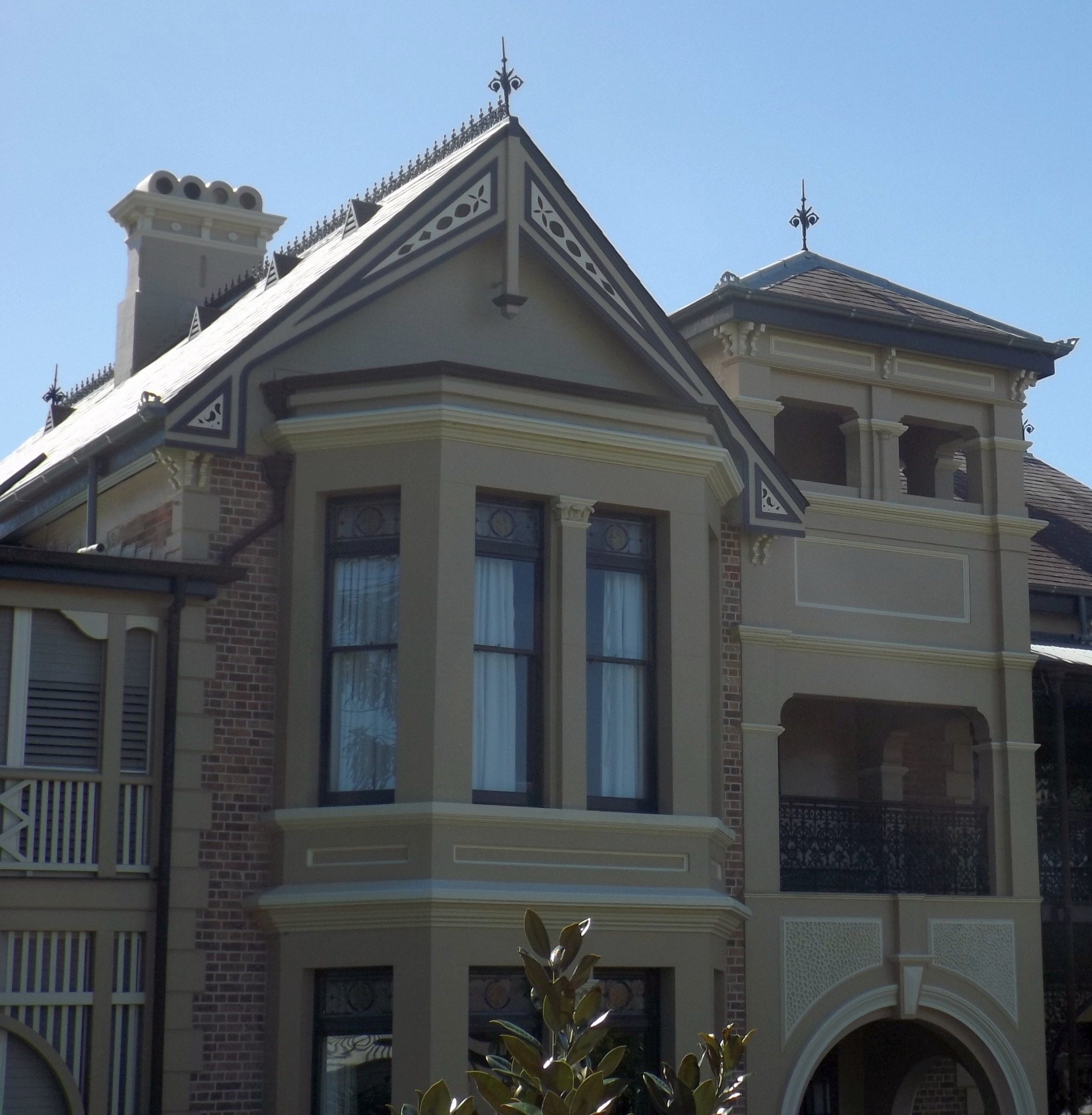
Front, 2015

Glengariff is a two-storey brick residence located on the corner of Derby and Burilda Streets Hendra, the heart of Brisbane's racing industry. It is set in generous grounds which have been reduced in size by the formation of TC Beirne Park to the north (c. 1949) and to the east the subdivision for residential purposes of land (1993) that was originally occupied by a tennis court and croquet green.

The property is accessed from Derby Street through a recent gate and via a semi-circular driveway. A double garage is located in Burilda Street which has a line of mature bunya pines running along its boundary. On the northern side of the house are two large camphor laurel trees. Other plantings appear to be of recent origin. A tennis court (1985) exists to the north of the house.

The house has a corrugated iron gabled roof with prominent chimneys, one four-flue and two three-flue, two positioned at the ridge line and one on the north end gable. The principal elevation facing Derby Street is asymmetric and has a rendered brick entry portico with a three-storey tower that rises through the first floor and above the gutter line and is finished with a low hipped roof. To the left of this is a rendered brick gabled wing with two storey bay window with central and top cornices. To the right a late Victorian two storey cast iron verandah runs around the eastern gabled wing. The verandah is supported on paired cast iron posts with a deep semicircular cast iron valance between, in a floral design, at ground floor and shallow valance above at first floor. The balustrade on the first floor is cast iron with a timber handrail. To the west is a wide Edwardian timber verandah extension which has detailing that is an interpretation of the late Victorian verandah with paired square timber posts, timber semicircular valance with slatted detail, slatted timber balustrade with central diamond pattern section at ground and first floors and shaped bracket posts at first floor. The walls beneath the verandahs are painted and unpainted brick with rendered quoins on the corners and surrounding doors, windows.

A lift has been installed on the northern verandah that rises through the first floor and is finished in a weatherboard-clad dormer.

A narrow, two-storey brick wing extends off the north side with a narrow, two-storey cast-iron verandah on the east side with the same cast-iron detail as the rest of the verandah but with a lancet-shaped valance. On the west of this wing the verandah has been enclosed with weatherboard.

Basement car parking has been created recently by excavation and the formation of a terrace to the north of the house. An original brick water tank which has a dome shaped top exists in this basement.

Glengariff, which now has plan form that is roughly T-shaped, is entered via the entrance portico through heavy timber double doors which have leadlight glass head and side windows. Above the door is located Bishop O'Donnell's Coat of Arms. The entrance hall is divided by a colonnade which leads to a single-width return timber stair up to the first floor. The flight of the stair, which has carved timber newels and turned balusters, appears to have been altered. To the left of the entrance stair is the dining room, which has a bay window at its southern end which has four high double-hung windows with leadlight hopper windows with a central roundel with painted birds (a detail repeated in other rooms) over. At the north end is a central black marble fireplace with surrounding high timber mantle with central mirror and flanking book cases. Early wallpaper is in evidence in the cupboards behind this fitting. This room opens out to the wide timber verandah to the west. To the north, behind the dining room, is another smaller room; physical evidence suggests that this may have originally accommodated the stair.

To the right of the entrance hall is a lounge room with white marble fireplace, surround and mantle. On the left side of this is a semicircular arched opening and on the right side a blind opening in the same detail. This room opens onto the verandah via French doors in the south and east elevations, and connects to the kitchen (inserted 1985) which has been fitted out in contemporary fashion. The north wall has been extended under the verandah with a timber-and-glass screen. There is a French door to the verandah in the east wall.

Access to the former kitchen wing is through single half-glass door with lead light over onto the northern verandah. This verandah leads to the former kitchen and a secondary stair to the first floor.

The main stair with a lead light window at the half landing rises to the first floor landing which has been altered towards the south to form bathroom facilities. To the left of the landing are two bedrooms that open out on to the verandah via French doors. To the south off the landing is a large bedroom with a bay window and openings onto the western verandah. To the north of this are a further two bedrooms and behind this the secondary stair and a bedroom in the former kitchen wing. The enclosed verandah on the western side contains a bedroom and bathroom.

Access to the tower is from the first floor verandah via a decorative cast iron spiral stair.

== Heritage listing ==
Glengariff was listed on the Queensland Heritage Register on 21 August 1992 having satisfied the following criteria.

The place is important in demonstrating the evolution or pattern of Queensland's history.

Constructed in 1888–89, Glengariff (or Dura as it was then known) is one of a number of large villa residences erected throughout Brisbane during the late nineteenth century. The semi-rural villas, of which Glengariff (with its remaining grounds) is typical, sought to combine the amenities of both the city and country and provide evidence of the marriage of buoyant economic times with the aspirations of those who benefited from them.

Glengariff is closely associated with the development of Hendra as the racing heart of Brisbane which followed on the establishment of Eagle Farm Racecourse (and subsequent subdivision of the original Deed of Grant by the Queensland Turf Club, of which Glengariff is part) and the opening of the Hendra Railway Station in 1882.

The place is important in demonstrating the principal characteristics of a particular class of cultural places.

The two storied brick Glengariff is a fine example of the work of architects HGO Thomas and RS (Robin) Dods whose 1907 additions included the two story verandah rooms to the western side.

The layout of the front drive and the line of bunya pines survive as evidence of early garden plans; the brick water tank is believed to be rare.

The place is important because of its aesthetic significance.

The house and grounds are of considerable aesthetic significance, in particular the qualities of the cast-iron work, joinery, glasswork, and the Dods additions.

The place has a special association with the life or work of a particular person, group or organisation of importance in Queensland's history.

For half a century Glengariff was the home of prominent Brisbane Catholic retailer, businessman, and benefactor TC Beirne and his family. Its gift to the Brisbane Diocese of the Roman Catholic Church after TC Beirne's death in 1949, and its subsequent use as the home of the Archbishop James Duhig's Coadjutor Archbishop O'Donnell (after the death of Duhig in 1965 Archbishop) for a further three decades, was a continuation of a long line of interwoven histories of TC Beirne, the church, and the city of Brisbane. Thus Glengariff was not only the home of one of the city's most influential citizens but also became a symbol of his collaboration with another, Archbishop James Duhig, who both individually and together did so much to shape the history (including the social and built fabric) of Brisbane in the first half of the century.
