= Tunley (surname) =

Tunley is a surname. Notable people with the surname include:

- David Tunley (1939–2024), Australian musicologist, professor and composer
- Richard Frank Tunley (1879–1968), Australian blinds manufacturer and inventor of educational resources
- Wayland Tunley (1937-2012), British architect
