= Charles Evans (railway manager) =

Colonel Barnard Charles Evans CMG (15 April 1845 – 31 December 1920), commonly written as Charles Barnard Evans, was Commissioner for Railways with the Queensland Government Railways from 1 June 1911 to 31 October 1918.

== Biography ==
Evans was born near Taunton in England in 1845; his father was a porter with the Great Western Railway. He started work for the same company.

=== Career in Australia ===
Charles Evans

Evans joined the Queensland Railways service in May 1867, when the only line was from Ipswich to Toowoomba a distance of 78 miles (126 km). In 1884 he was appointed inspector of the southern and western divisions. In 1885 he was appointed timetable clerk by J. T. Thallon, then in 1890 was promoted to traffic superintendent and in 1891 district traffic manager for Townsville and in 1894 the same position in Maryborough. During this time he earned Thallon's thanks for his performance during a flood disaster, and a bonus for his expeditious organisation of a line duplication. He became traffic manager, Townsville, in 1896; in 1901 the Commissioner's inspector for the northern division and in early May 1908 succeeded Robert Dunbar as general traffic manager, Brisbane. On 1 June 1911 he succeeded Thallon and (briefly) King as Commissioner, a position he held until his retirement in July 1918.

During his time as commissioner, many large and important works were completed: sheds for rolling stock at Mayne, rearrangement of the facilities at Roma Street, Ipswich, South Brisbane, Toowoomba, Warwick, and Townsville, a new locomotive depot at Rockhampton, and a great deal of line duplication throughout the State.

In 1914 he was awarded the distinction of CMG.

== Family ==
Evans married Mary Ann Thompson on 22 March 1867. She died on 6 March 1919 at the family home "Acland," Adelaide Street, Clayfield.

Charles was not in good health in the latter part of his life and he died at "Acland" on 31 December 1920. The reports of his funeral which was held on the next day, 1 January 1921, listed the seven surviving children as four sons Messrs G. H. and A. J. Evans (in attendance at the service) and Messrs Charles and William Evans (away in North Queensland); and three daughters - "Miss Evans, Mrs Curtis and Mrs Hogan."
