= National Australia Bank, Childers =

National Australia Bank
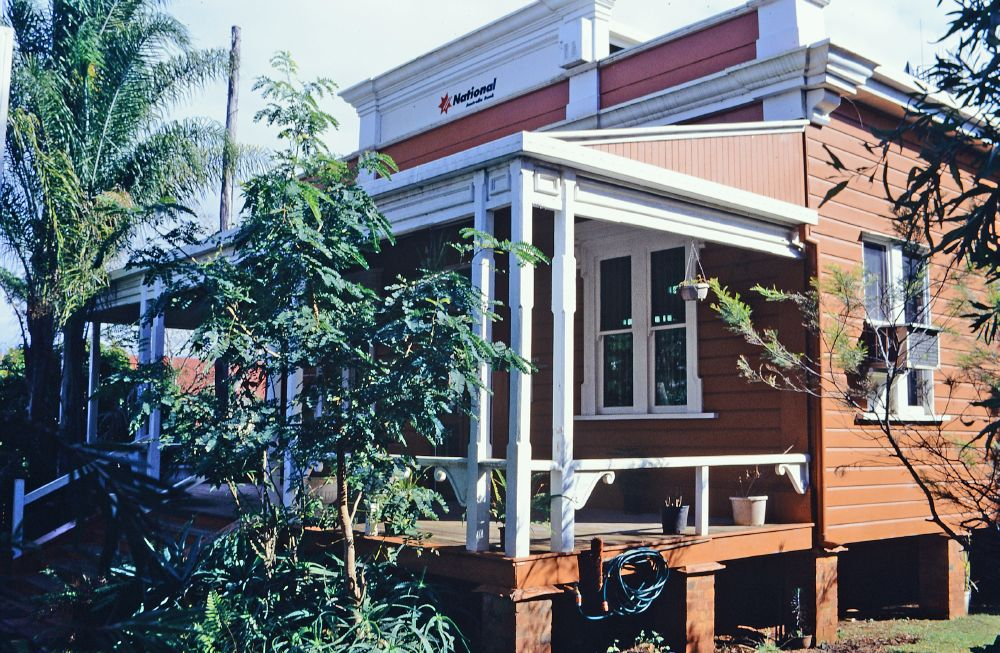
- National Australia Bank, 1994

- Location within Queensland Location within Australia
- 25.236°S 152.2788°E
- Location: 61 Churchill Street, Childers, Bundaberg Region, Queensland, Australia

History
- Design period: 1900–1914 (early 20th century)
- Built: c. 1900

Site notes
- Architect: Hubert George Octavius Thomas

Queensland Heritage Register
- Official name: National Australia Bank, Bank of North Queensland, Bank of Queensland, National Bank of Australasia
- Type: state heritage (built)
- Designated: 21 October 1992
- Reference no.: 600616
- Significant period: c. 1900 (fabric) c. 1900–ongoing (historical use)
- Significant components: strong room, banking chamber

The National Australia Bank is a heritage-listed bank building at 61 Churchill Street, Childers, Bundaberg Region, Queensland, Australia. It was designed by Hubert George Octavius Thomas and built c. 1900. It is also known as Bank of North Queensland, Bank of Queensland, and National Bank of Australasia. It was added to the Queensland Heritage Register on 21 October 1992.

== History ==
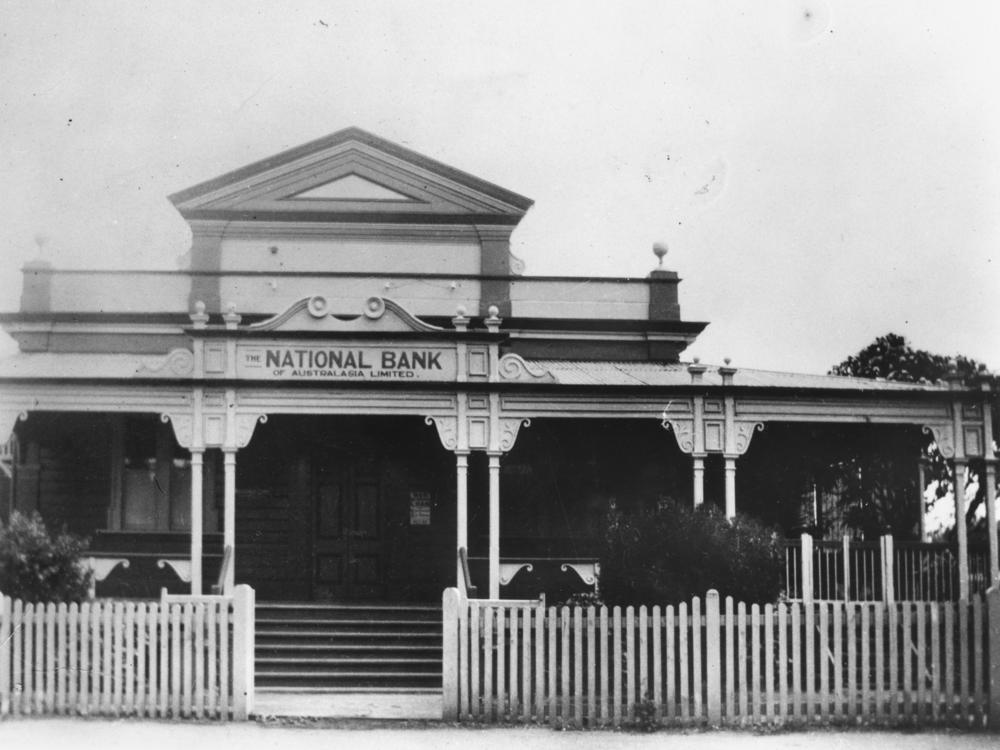
Childers branch of the National Bank of Australia, ca. 1948

This single-storeyed timber building, which initially comprised banking chambers at the front of the building and a manager's residence at the rear, was erected c. 1900 as the Childers branch of the Bank of North Queensland, established in Townsville in 1888. The Bank of North Queensland was the only bank ever directed from northern Queensland, and was the first to capitalise on the need for banking facilities in the newly emerging sugar town of Childers.

Following logging of the dense Isis Scrub in the 1870s, Childers, in the heart of the scrub, was promoted in the 1880s by Maryborough interests, as an agricultural district. The land in the immediate vicinity of the present town of Childers was surveyed in 1882 into 50 acres (20 ha) farm blocks. There was no official town survey; Childers developed following the private subdivision of portions 870 and 871, at the railhead of the 1887 Isis railway line from Isis Junction railway station. This was opened on 31 October 1887, and was intended principally to facilitate the transport of timber from the scrub. The coming of the railway not only promoted the development of the town of Childers; it also proved the catalyst for the establishment of a sugar industry in the district in the late 1880s. At the opening of the railway to Childers, Robert Cran, owner of Maryborough's Yengarie mill, announced that he would erect a double crushing juice mill at Doolbi, to supply his mill at Yengarie. This was completed in 1890, with the juice being brought in railway tankers from the Isis. Further expansion of the sugar industry in the Isis was closely related to the activities of the Colonial Sugar Refining Company, which erected a central crushing mill in the district 1893–94, and began crushing in 1895. By 1895, at least three other mills had been established in the Isis, with another two under construction, and Childers had emerged as the flourishing centre of a substantial sugar-growing district.

Whilst Queensland in general was in a slow recovery mode following the depression of the early 1890s and the 1893 banking crisis, Childers offered attractive advantages to any banking institution contemplating expansion. The Bank of North Queensland was the first to seize the opportunity, and in a notice dated 6 September 1895, published in the Brisbane Courier on the following day, the general manager of the Bank of North Queensland, announced that an agency of the bank was now opened at Childers, for the transaction of all usual banking business. Joseph Harding Forbes is recorded as having entered the service of the Bank of North Queensland on 10 September 1895 as the first manager of the new branch at Childers.

It is not known from which premises the bank operated initially, as the Bank of North Queensland did not acquire the present site until August 1899. By this time a branch of the Commercial Banking Company of Sydney had been established in the town, opening in rented premises in 1897. The CBC acquired a permanent site in May 1899, and by March 1900, their new purpose-built banking chambers were approximately 6 weeks from completion. This activity may have induced the Bank of North Queensland to erect new premises in the same year.

In August 1900, Brisbane architect HGO Thomas called tenders for the erection of new banking premises at Childers. This is understood to be for the Bank of North Queensland, as the CBC had already erected premises, and the only other bank in the town, the Queensland National Bank, had opened in rented premises in July 1900, and did not erect their own building until 1919.

The Bank of North Queensland building at Childers survived the 1902 fire which razed most of the premises on the opposite side of the street. The town was virtually rebuilt at this time.

In January 1917, the Bank of North Queensland and the Royal Bank of Queensland, established in Brisbane in 1885 to challenge the colonial dominance of the Queensland National Bank, merged to form the Bank of Queensland, and the premises at Childers were retained as a branch of the new bank. When the Bank of Queensland was absorbed by the National Bank of Australasia in 1922, the Childers building became a branch of the National Bank.

By c. 1948, a verandah had been added along the eastern side and rear of the building, apparently for the use of the manager and his family. In November 1953, the Isis Shire Council approved an application by the National Bank of Australasia Ltd to erect a new bank manager's residence in Childers, and photographic evidence suggests that at this time the living quarters at the back of the building were incorporated into the banking area, the side and rear verandahs were removed, as were the central pediment, finials, and brackets and capitals to the front verandah posts. The new manager's residence, erected at the rear of the bank building, on the block of land facing Crescent Street, does not form part of the heritage listing.

Since 1983, the Childers office has functioned as a branch of the National Australia Bank, formed by the amalgamation of the National Bank of Australasia Ltd and the Commercial Banking Company of Sydney Ltd.

== Description ==
The National Australia Bank, a single-storeyed chamferboard building with brick piers and a corrugated iron hipped roof, is located fronting Churchill Street, the main street of Childers, to the south. The building, built parallel to the western boundary, is set back from the street frontage with a lawn area to the east.

The building has a symmetrical parapeted facade above a wide street verandah. The parapet consists of timber pilasters and deep timber cornices, with much of the original fanciful timber work including pediment, finials and scrolls having been removed. The verandah has paired timber posts, a panelled frieze with timber mouldings, a timber rail supported by scroll shaped brackets, and wide timber entrance steps. The twin entrance doors with fanlight are framed by timber pilasters, and the paired timber sashes to either side have wide timber surrounds with deep cornices above.

The eastern side has undergone a number of changes resulting in a variety of window types, including paired sashes to the front banking chamber and hoppers to the rear. The western side has paired timber sashes with timber batten window hoods. The rear has a masonry chimney to the northwest corner.

Internally, the building consists of a banking chamber to the front with a manager's office, store and strongroom behind with a corridor leading to a kitchen area and toilets at the rear. The building has walls of vertically jointed boards, boarded ceilings, and deep timber skirtings and architraves. Doors into the manager's office are without fanlights and have narrower architraves. The masonry strongroom is located on the western side and has a steel door opening to the banking chamber. The rear kitchen area has a timber ceiling rose and fireplace surround. The central section at the rear, housing toilets and passageways, has a slightly lowered floor level and hardboard ceilings.

A timber paling fence along the street boundary has an early corner post with turned capital at the eastern end.

== Heritage listing ==
National Australia Bank was listed on the Queensland Heritage Register on 21 October 1992 having satisfied the following criteria.

The place is important in demonstrating the evolution or pattern of Queensland's history.

The National Australia Bank building at Childers is important in illustrating the pattern of Queensland history, being erected during a period of unprecedented growth in the Isis, when Childers was emerging as the flourishing centre of a substantial sugar-growing district.

The place is important in demonstrating the principal characteristics of a particular class of cultural places.

The building has been occupied as banking premises since its construction c. 1900, and survives as a substantially intact, small, rural, turn-of-the-century timber bank building.

The place is important because of its aesthetic significance.

The building, particularly due to its decorative timber street facade, use of scale, form and materials, contributes to the heritage significance of the Churchill Street streetscape and Childers townscape. The composition and treatment of timber details illustrates a quality and competency of design.

The place has a special association with the life or work of a particular person, group or organisation of importance in Queensland's history.

The place has a strong association with the work of the Bank of North Queensland, which was the first banking institution to open an agency at Childers, in 1895, and has been associated with the National Bank since 1922.
