= Tarranalma =

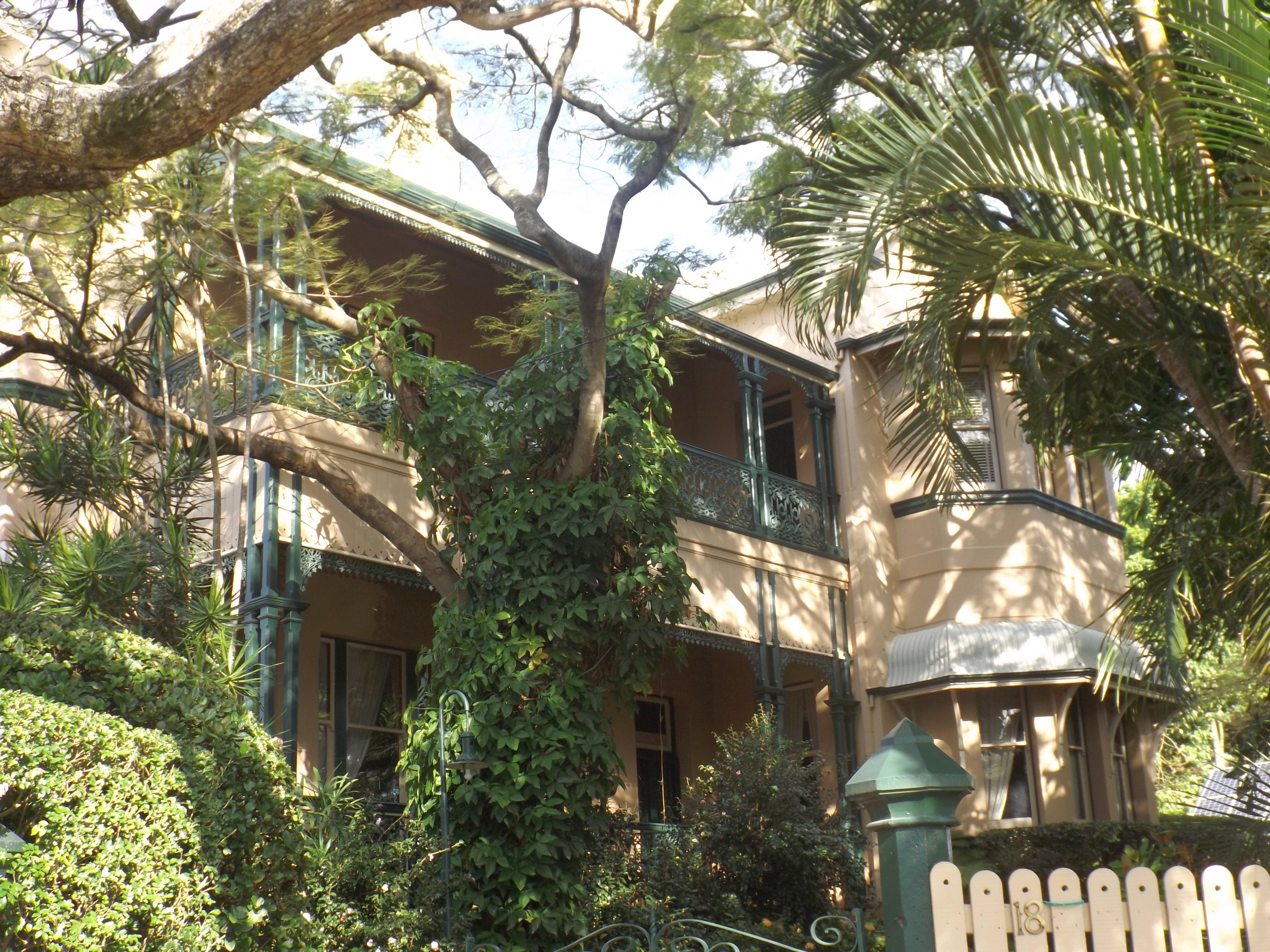
- Property in 2015

- Location within Queensland Location within Australia
- 27.4251°S 153.0482°E
- Location: 18 Tarranalma Avenue, Clayfield, City of Brisbane, Queensland, Australia

History
- Design period: 1870s–1890s (late 19th century)
- Built: 1890

Queensland Heritage Register
- Official name: Tarranalma
- Type: state heritage (built)
- Designated: 21 October 1992
- Reference no.: 600184
- Significant period: 1890s (fabric); 1880s/1890s (historical)
- Significant components: service wing, residential accommodation – main house, billiards room

Tarranalma is a heritage-listed villa at 18 Tarranalma Avenue, Clayfield, City of Brisbane, Queensland, Australia. It was built in 1890. It was added to the Queensland Heritage Register on 21 October 1992.

== History ==
This two-storeyed brick house was built in 1890 for James Milne of the firm Smellie & Co. Although no architect is known, the house has many similarities to Verney by Richard Gailey.

In 1910, Milne offered Tarranalma as a possible replacement for Old Government House, but his price was too high and Fernberg in Paddington is now Queensland's Government House. In 1919, he sold the property to George Logan who was a prominent pastoralist. Originally it stood in some 12 acres (4.8 hectares) of grounds but from 1926 to 1929 Logan subdivided and sold off most of the property.

After the death of his widow Susan in 1963, the house was converted into seven flats. In 1984, Tarranalma was sold to its present owners who have restored it as a family home.

== Description ==
Tarranalma is a large two-storeyed house built in rendered brick with a corrugated iron roof. The house is surrounded by 8-foot (2.4 m) wide verandahs on both floors, which are interrupted by four double-storey projecting bays featuring bow windows.

On the ground floor, the square core contains the drawing, breakfast, dining and billiard rooms around a central hallway. The hallway leads to the substantial service wing which includes the kitchen, two large pantries, two bedrooms and a bathroom. A large staircase between the dining and billiard rooms leads to four large bedrooms which repeat the layout of the main rooms below. Above the service wing are five smaller bedrooms linked to the service rooms by a staircase at the far end of the wing.

== Heritage listing ==
Tarranalma was listed on the Queensland Heritage Register on 21 October 1992 having satisfied the following criteria.

The place is important in demonstrating the evolution or pattern of Queensland's history.

As evidence of the confidence of the 1880s boom.

The place is important in demonstrating the principal characteristics of a particular class of cultural places.

As characteristic of the large houses built on the hills to the northeast of the city and stylistically similar to contemporary houses such as Monte Video and Verney.
