= Clayfield =

- Suburb
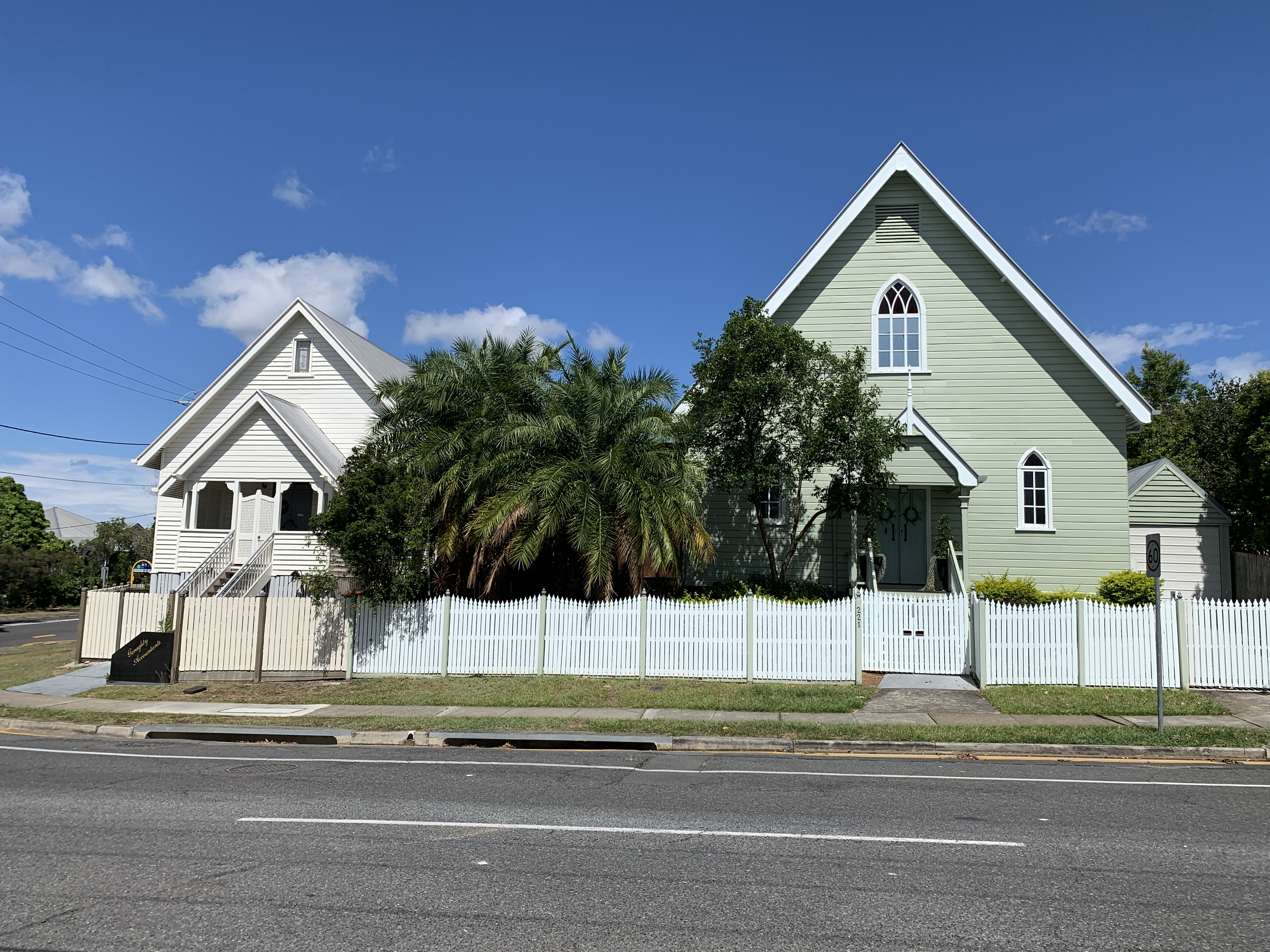
- Former Eagle Junction Congregational Church (right) and hall (left)

- Interactive map of Clayfield
- Coordinates: 27.4183°S 153.0544°E
- Country: Australia
- State: Queensland
- City: Brisbane
- LGA: City of Brisbane (Hamilton Ward)
- Location: 7.4 km (4.6 mi) NE of Brisbane CBD

Government
  - State electorate: Clayfield
  - Federal division: Brisbane

Area
  - Total: 2.8 km^{2} (1.1 sq mi)

Population
  - Total: 10,897 (2021 census)
  - Density: 3,890/km^{2} (10,080/sq mi)
- Time zone: UTC+10:00 (AEST)
- Postcode: 4011
Suburbs around Clayfield
Kalinga	Nundah	Nundah
Wooloowin	Clayfield	Hendra
Albion	Ascot	Ascot

Clayfield is a suburb in the City of Brisbane, Queensland, Australia. In the 2021 census, Clayfield had a population of 10,897 people.

== Geography ==
Clayfield is 7.4 kilometres (5 mi) by road from the Brisbane CBD. Clayfield is bordered to the north by Nundah, to the east by Ascot and Hendra, to the west by Wooloowin and to the south by Albion.

Its name derives from the fine white-grey sedimentary clay mined in Albion, between Morgan and Sykes Street, used in the brickworks that once existed between Oriel Road and Reeve Street near Sandgate Road. This industry, once known as "the clay fields", was instrumental in the residential surge of European settlement of inner-north Brisbane.

Kalinga Park and the Kalinga locality lay on the northern limit. Clayfield also encompasses the locality of Eagle Junction.

== History ==
In 1874 a Baptist Church opened in Hendra/Clayfield.

In October 1885, "Sefton Estate" consisting of 254 16 perch allotments were auctioned by John Cameron, Auctioneer. The land for sale is re-subdivisions of subdivisions 2 to 3 of Portions 78 and 79, Parish of Toombul. A map advertising the auction provides a local sketch of the area.

In January 1886, 392 allotments of land of "Noble Estate", were advertised for auction by R.D. Graham & Son, Auctioneers. A map advertising the auction states the land is situated on the main Sandgate Road and Kedron Brook.

In February 1888, "Isleton Estate" made up of 236 allotments were auctioned by R. R. Cottell. A map advertising the auction states the Estate was exactly opposite Eagle Junction Railway Station with 30 trains passing a day.

In June 1888 "The Eagle Farm and Sandgate Estate", made up of 75 16 perch allotments, was advertised for auction by G.T. Bell, Auctioneer. The land for sale is re-subdivisions of subdivisions 13 to 25 of allotment 4 of Portion 5, Parish of Toombul. A map advertising the auction includes a local sketch of the area that shows close proximity to the railway line.

A United Methodist Free Church was built circa 1889 at present-day 221 Bonney Avenue (27.4163°S 153.0483°E). In 1901, not wishing to be part of the amalgamation of the Methodist denominations into the new Methodist Church of Australasia, the congregation decided to become Eagle Junction Congregational Church. In December, a Sunday School hall was added to the northern side of the church on the corner of Norman Parade.

Clayfield State School opened on 8 July 1895. In July 1901 it was renamed Eagle Junction State School.

On 28 October 1899, sixty allotments of land of "Albion Hill Estate", being re-subdivisions 1 to 60, of subdivision of section 3 of portion 162, Parish of Enoggera, were advertised for auction by Isles, Love & Co. The advertising map states the estate's proximity to Albion Train Station, with 76 trains daily. The land for sale was situated between Camden St, Albion, and Ford St and Old Sandgate Rd (now Bonney Ave), Clayfield.

A stump-capping ceremony for Wooloowin Methodist Church was held on Saturday 30 November 1901. The site was on Old Sandgate Road at the junction with Bayview Terrace (now 170 Bonney Avenue). While the church was being built, it was destroyed by a cyclone in January 1901. The church was re-built and opened on Sunday 13 April 1902 by Reverend Robert Stewart, President of the Queensland Methodist Conference. In 1975 Wooloowin Methodist Church amalgamated with Eagle Junction Congregational Church (at 211 Bonney Avenue) to form the Bonney Avenue Cooperative Parish. Following the amalgamation that created the Uniting Church in Australia in 1977, it was renamed Clayfield Uniting Church and decided to operate exclusively from the site of the Wooloowin Methodist Church. The Eagle Junction Congregational Church and its adjacent hall at 5 Norman Parade were sold into private ownership; both buildings still exist and are listed on the Brisbane Heritage Register. The foundation stone of the current Clayfield Uniting Church building was laid on Sunday 2 March 1986 by Reverend Leslie Tiplin Vickery and it was opened and dedicated on 5 April 1987 by Reverend Barry Dangerfield.

In February 1920, "The Drane Estate", made up of 71/2 allotments plus a substantial residence on 2 1/2 allotments, was advertised for auction by Thorpe & Sharp, Auctioneers. A map advertising the auction states the estate is overlooking Clayfoeld Station, 6 minutes from Eagle Junction Railway Station and 3 minutes from Clayfield Tram Terminus.

In April 1920, "Insulae Park Estate" made up of 23 allotments was advertised for auction by Thorpe & Son, Auctioneers. A map advertising the auction states the estate is 5 minute walk to Clayfield Station and Tram.

St Agatha's Catholic Primary School opened on 27 January 1925.

St Rita's College opened on 31 January 1926.

Clayfield College opened on 9 February 1931.

== Demographics ==
In the 2011 census, Clayfield recorded a population of 10,006 people, 52.6% female and 47.4% male. The median age of the Clayfield population was 34 years of age, 3 years below the Australian median. 70.3% of people living in Clayfield were born in Australia, compared to the national average of 69.8%; the next most common countries of birth were New Zealand 3.7%, England 3.6%, India 2.5%, Philippines 0.8%, and China 0.8%. 81.9% of people spoke only English at home; the next most popular languages were 1% Italian, 1% Mandarin, 0.7% Punjabi, 0.7% Korean, and 0.7% Hindi

In the 2016 census, Clayfield had a population of 10,555 people.

In the 2021 census, Clayfield had a population of 10,897 people.

== Heritage listings ==
Clayfield has a number of heritage-listed sites, including:

- Casa Mara, 138 Adelaide Street East
- Tresco, 140 Adelaide Street East
- Mardan, 143 Adelaide Street East
- Rangemoor, 165 Adelaide Street East
- Railway footbridge, adjacent Alexandra Road
- Francisca, 159 Alexandra Road
- Tressylian, 12 Armagh Street
- Cotswold, 19 Batman Street
- Cranagh (Federation bungalow), 19 Bayview Terrace
- Eagle Junction State School, Memorial gates, fence & trees, 48 Bayview Terrace
- former Scots Presbyterian Manse, 27 Bellevue Terrace
- Old English Interwar house, 38 Bellevue Terrace
- Bellevue Court, 5 Bonney Avenue
- St Marks Anglican Church, 103 Bonney Avenue
- Pagoda Villa, 146 Bonney Avenue
- former Congregational Church & Hall, 221 Bonney Avenue
- Ben Nevis, 36 Christian Street
- Delcotta, 19 Craven Street
- Moortangi, 56 Crombie Street
- Stanley Hall, 25 Enderley Road
- Ralahyne, 40 Enderley Road
- California bungalow, 57 Enderley Road
- Linstarfield, 64 Enderley Road
- Girrawheen, 71 Enderley Road
- Enderley Road Heritage Precinct, 72 Enderley Road
- California bungalow, 77 Enderley Road
- Breffney, 83 Enderley Road
- Springfield, 24 Ford Street
- Warley, 24 Franz Road
- Ferguslea, 36 Franz Road
- The Coverts, 30 Gregory Street
- Elveden, 34 Gregory Street
- Interwar Functionalist house, 20 Jolly Street
- Interwar Mediterranean house, 24 Jolly Street
- Interwar Queenslander house, 30 Jolly Street
- former Shop & Residence, 276 Junction Road
- Waitara, 30 Liverpool Road
- Lyndhurst, 3 London Road
- Turrawan (Clayfield House), 8 London Road
- Lalala, 21 Milne Street
- Bunburra, 18 Norman Parade
- Federation Queenslander house, 22 Norman Parade
- Federation bungalow, 26 Norman Parade
- Federation Queenslander house, 51 Norman Parade
- St Agatha's Catholic Church, 52 Oriel Road
- World War I bungalow, 71 Oriel Road
- Kent Lodge, 94 Oriel Road
- Scots Presbyterian Memorial Church, 7 Queens Road
- Telephone exchange, 8 Reeve Street
- Ben Nevis Lodge gates & fence, 26 Rees Avenue
- Tram Shelter & Fig Trees, Sandgate Road
- Hampton Court, 436 Sandgate Road
- Shop, 462 Sandgate Road
- Coraki Court, 464 Sandgate Road
- former Turrawan Private Hospital, 641 Sandgate Road
- former Commonwealth Bank, 707 Sandgate Road
- Tarranalma, 18 Tarranalma Avenue
- St Colomb's Anglican Church & War Memorial, 23 Victoria Street
- Second Church of Christ, Scientist Church, Sunday School & Reading Room, 21 Vine Street
- Clayfield Memorial School of Arts, 32 Wagner Road
- Beaufort Hill, 59 Wellington Street

== Education ==
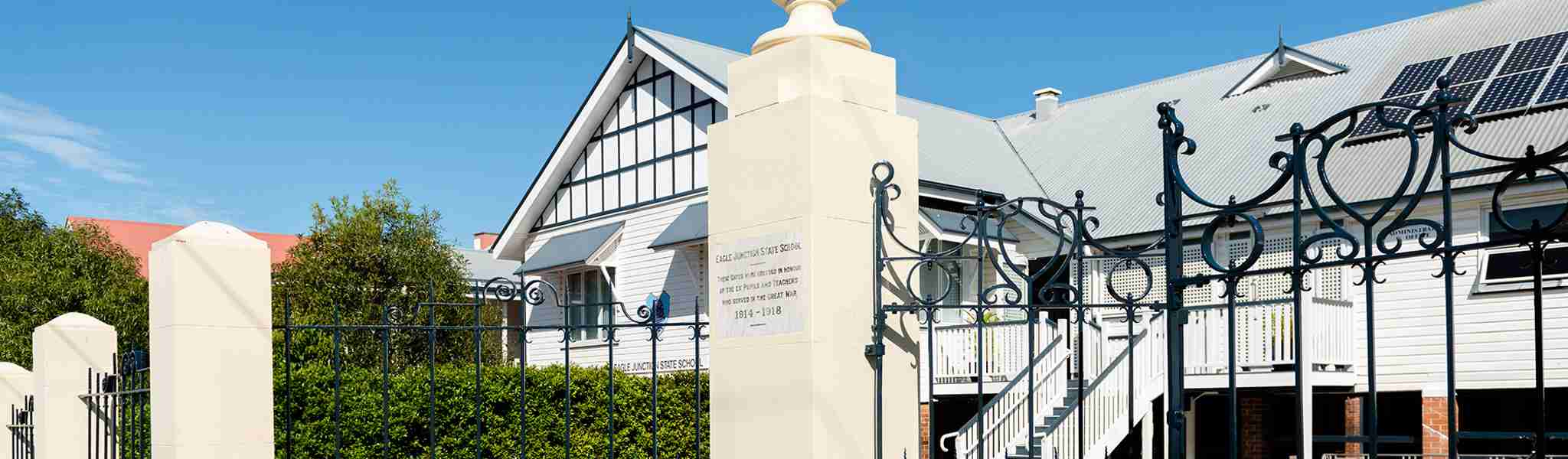
Eagle Junction State School, 2020

Eagle Junction State School is a government primary (Prep-6) school for boys and girls at 49 Roseby Avenue (27.4177°S 153.0504°E). In 2018, the school had an enrolment of 877 students with 66 teachers (52 full-time equivalent) and 30 non-teaching staff (17 full-time equivalent). It includes a special education program.

St Agatha's Primary School is a Catholic primary (Prep-6) school for boys and girls at 6 Hunter Lane (27.4260°S 153.0547°E). In 2018, the school had an enrolment of 338 students with 24 teachers (21 full-time equivalent) and 17 non-teaching staff (11 full-time equivalent).It is operated by Brisbane Catholic Education.

St Rita's College is a Catholic secondary (7-12) school for girls at 41 Enderley Road (27.4249°S 153.0561°E). In 2018, the school had an enrolment of 1005 students with 74 teachers (71 full-time equivalent) and 44 non-teaching staff (39 full-time equivalent).

Clayfield College is a private primary and secondary (Prep-12) school for boys and girls at 23 Gregory Street (27.4202°S 153.0519°E). In 2018, the school had an enrolment of 565 students with 69 teachers (64 full-time equivalent) and 40 non-teaching staff (34 full-time equivalent).

There are no government secondary schools in Clayfield. The nearest government secondary schools are Aviation High in neighbouring Hendra to the north-east and Kedron State High School in Kedron to the west.

== Amenities ==
Churches that are located in Clayfield include:

- Clayfield Baptist Church
- Clayfield Gospel Hall
- St Agatha's Catholic Church
- St Mark's Anglican Church
- Scots Presbyterian Church

Despite its name, Clayfield Uniting Church is at 170 Bonney Avenue in neighbouring Wooloowin (27.4186°S 153.0474°E).

Clayfield was served by an electric tram line which ran along Sandgate Road until its closure on 13 April 1969. It is now served by bus and train services from the nearby Clayfield railway station and Eagle Junction railway station. Along the capital road (Alexandra Road), a canopy of poinciana and oak trees produce a 'New England' canopy effect.

== Notable residents ==
- Charles Evans CMG, Commissioner of Railways
- Timothy Joseph O'Leary (1925–1987), flying doctor
- Richard Frank Tunley, developer of educational resources for blind children
- Mary Hyacinthe Petronel White (1900–1984), women's rights campaigner and local government councillor
