= Stanley Hall, Clayfield =

Stanley Hall
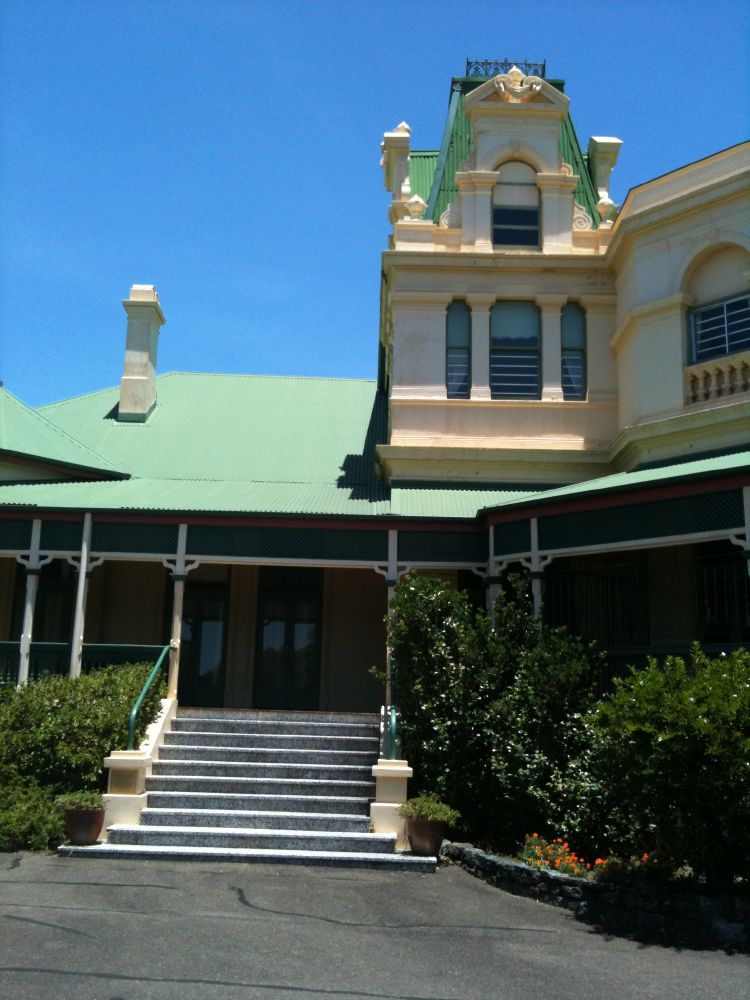
- Stanley Hall, 2012

- Location within Queensland Location within Australia
- 27.4253°S 153.0555°E
- Location: 25 Enderley Road, Clayfield, City of Brisbane, Queensland, Australia

History
- Built: 1885–c. 1890

Site notes
- Architect: George Henry Male Addison
- Architectural style: Italianate

Queensland Heritage Register
- Official name: Stanley Hall, St Rita's Convent School
- Type: state heritage
- Designated: 21 October 1992
- Reference no.: 600183
- Significant period: 1880s–1920s (residence); 1920s– (school)
- Significant components: tower – observation/lookout, strong room

Stanley Hall is a heritage-listed former residence at 25 Enderley Road, Clayfield, City of Brisbane, Queensland, Australia. It was first built in 1885 and redeveloped c. 1890 to a design by architect George Henry Male Addison. It is now part of St Rita's College. It was added to the Queensland Heritage Register on 21 October 1992.

== History ==
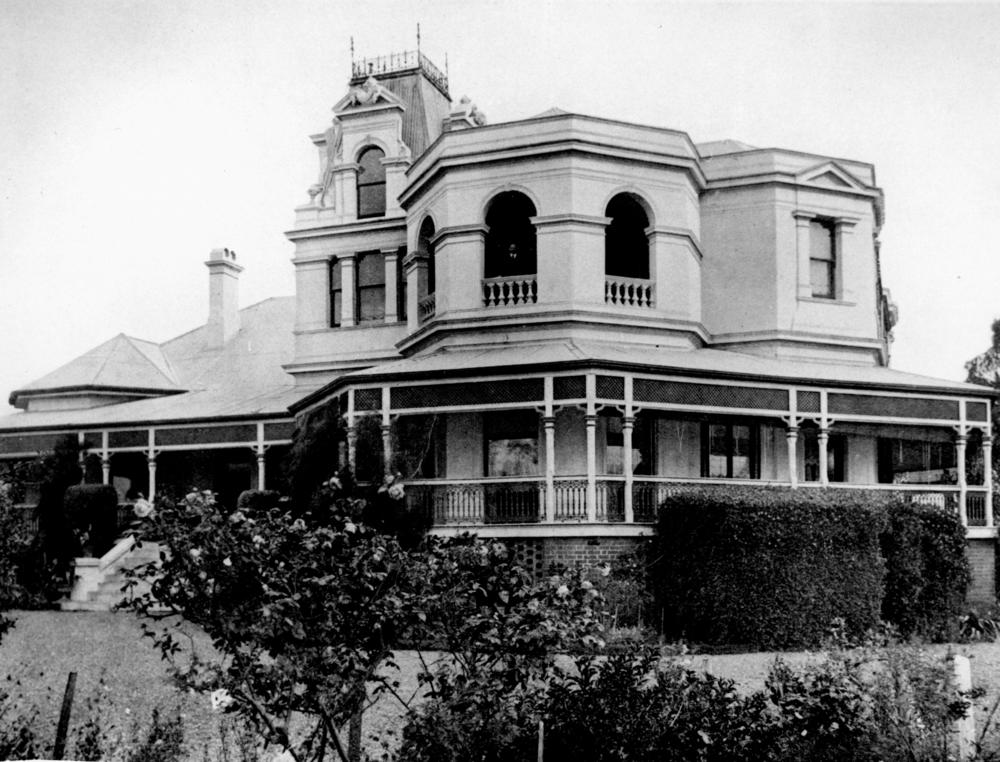
Stanley Hall, circa 1913

This large masonry residence was erected c. 1885-86 as a single-storeyed building for successful Brisbane produce dealer John William Forth. The house was remodelled and two-storeyed additions were constructed for the subsequent owner, Western Queensland pastoralist Herbert Hunter, in 1890.

The site was part of a larger parcel of land, comprising portions 86–90, parish of Toombul, first alienated by Brisbane businessman James Sutherland in 1858. Sutherland's interest in this property was purely speculative. He later subdivided portions 86 & 87 into four allotments, but in 1879 transferred the bulk of these subdivisions (approximately 23 acres) to Queensland pastoralist and politician, William Alcock Tully. Tully also acquired the property as an investment, and in 1881 sold subdivisions 3 & 4 of portions 86 & 87, comprising over 12.5 acres, to another Queensland pastoralist, politician and businessman, Charles Lumley Hill. This property was transferred in January 1885 to John William Forth, who subsequently erected Stanley Hall on the site.

John Forth and his wife Selina had arrived in Brisbane in May 1857, when in their early twenties, and had been associated with the development of Brisbane for close to thirty years before acquiring the Albion (now Clayfield) property. Forth built up a successful wholesale and retail produce business in Brisbane, and was alderman for the East Ward in 1882 and 1883. In the early 1880s, the family - which included 10 children by August 1880 - was resident on Wickham Terrace. Stanley Hall appears to have been erected for the Forth family in 1885–86.

The Forths resided only a short time at Stanley Hall. Clara Forth, their 20-year-old daughter, died there in 1886, and shortly after the family returned from a visit to Europe toward the end of the year, John Forth was killed while helping transplant trees in a paddock near his home, on 28 December 1886.

The property had been transferred to Selina Forth in April 1886, but after John's death the family moved back to Wickham Terrace in 1887, and let Stanley Hall to Brisbane sharebroker and commission agent John Wilson. In August 1888 the property was transferred to Herbert Hunter, who at the same time borrowed £6,000 from Selina Forth.

Hunter had emigrated from Scotland to Australia in 1863, when aged 27. He tried a variety of jobs, eventually gaining employment as a clerk on William Miles' Dulacca sheep station, on the Condamine River near Roma. In 1866, Hunter married Miles' daughter, Jessie, and ran Dulacca for his father-in-law for some years. Miles transferred to Hunter the lease of Redford station in the Maranoa district in the early 1870s, and Victoria Downs in the Warrego district by the mid-1870s. Hunter had disposed of Redford by the mid-1880s, but retained the vast consolidated run of Victoria Downs. Stanley Hall was purchased in 1888 as his town house.

A successful grazier and horse racing enthusiast, Hunter appears to have acquired Stanley Hall more for its proximity to the Eagle Farm Racecourse than for the house itself, which he subsequently redeveloped into the present grand residence. In 1889, he commissioned Brisbane architect GHM Addison to remodel the existing house and design extensive additions, at a cost of £3,550. The house was virtually re-built 1889–90, and an upper storey and tower were added, permitting views of the nearby racecourse, and across the Brisbane River to Moreton Bay. A gabled timber coachhouse and stables were erected near the house, and an extensive orchard was established, occupying the block now bounded by Enderley and Alexandra Roads and Florence and Craven Streets.

Hunter eventually sold Stanley Hall in 1910 to wealthy pastoralist Edward Goddard Blume, who owned a string of stations (principally sheep) throughout Queensland and New South Wales. Like Hunter, he owned several racehorses, and won a number of Melbourne and Caulfield cups. Blume was well known in Queensland social circles, and during the visit of the Prince of Wales (later Edward VIII) to Brisbane in July 1920, entertained the Prince at Stanley Hall.

In the early 1920s, Blume subdivided and sold off the bulk of the property, and in 1926 the house, on 4.5 acres of land, was sold to the Order of the Sisters of the Presentation in Queensland for £22,000. The Presentation Sisters operated a convent and primary school (St Rita's Convent School) on an adjacent site and converted Stanley Hill into a boarding school and secondary school for girls in September 1926. In subsequent years the school expanded, with the first new building erected in 1939. The attached, single-storeyed kitchen and service wing was demolished in 1968 to make way for a new classroom block, and the coachhouse and stables no longer survive. None of the post-1926 structures is included in the entry in the Heritage Register.

In 2009, the house was converted into an administration centre with a heritage room devoted to the history of the Sisters and the College.

== Description ==
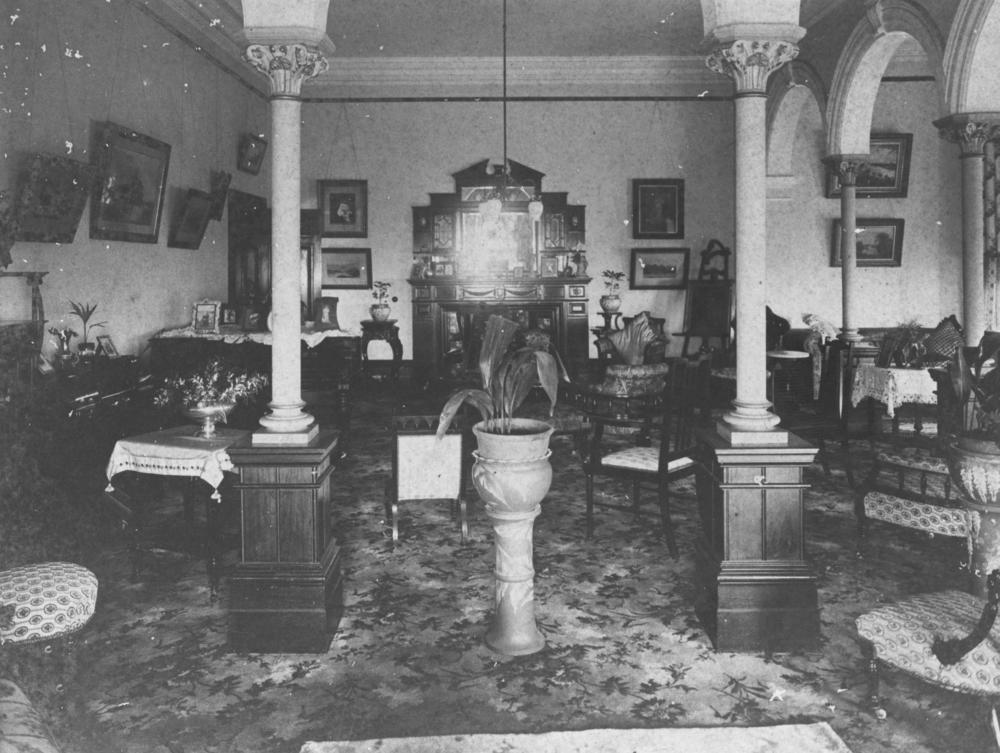
Drawing room during E. G. Blume's occupancy, circa 1910

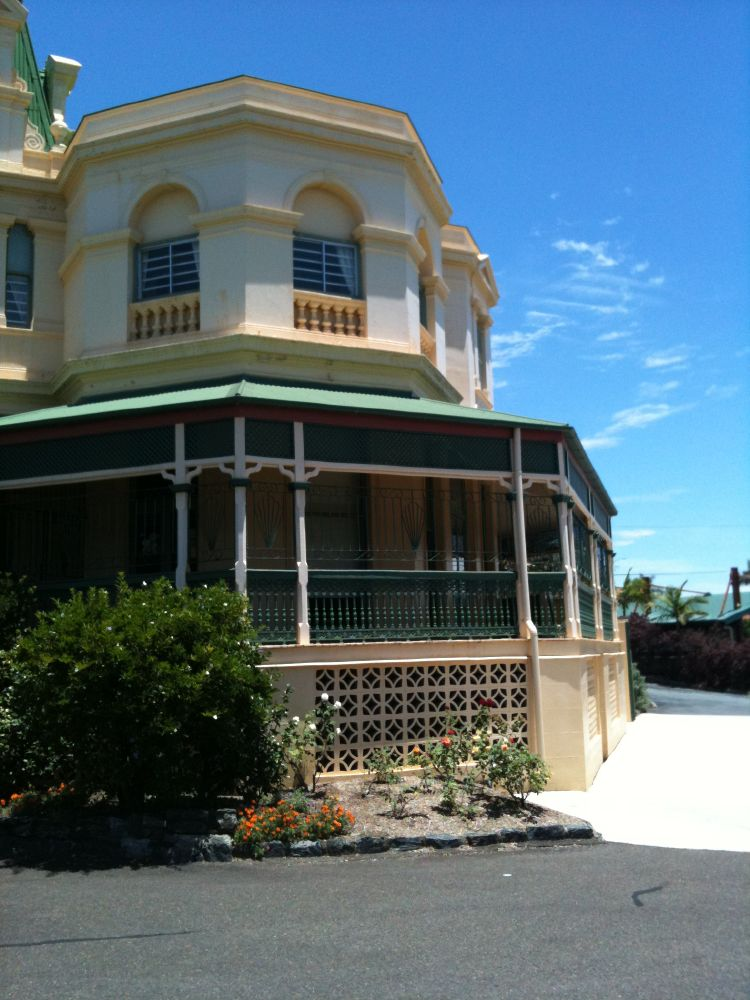
Stanley Hall wrap-around verandahs, 2012

Stanley Hall is a substantial two-storeyed rendered masonry former residence located on the rise of Clayfield Heights. The building is located at the core of St Rita's College, overlooking a tree-lined entrance drive and front gardens to the north-east, and capturing expansive views to the north and the east.

Stanley Hall's complex form reflects its different stages of construction. The ground floor (1885–86) is oriented north-east, whilst the upper floor (1890) is orientated east west, creating another primary frontage for the building. The eastern elevation is asymmetrical and steps back to a single-storeyed bay to the south, with a two-storeyed bay at the northern end adjacent to an off-centre tower which rises to three storeys. The northern elevation is a more formal arrangement of two-storeyed bays flanking a now enclosed verandah. A ground floor timber verandah encircles the building. The corrugated iron roof comprises hipped roofs over bays projecting from central hipped roofs to the ground and first floors, and skillions to the verandahs. The tower has a crested mansard roof.

The building retains some of its rich ornamentation. The first floor bays on the northern frontage have single windows framed by pilasters, and are encircled with cornices, with a parapet with pediments above the windows. The two-storeyed parapeted bay to the eastern frontage has a (now enclosed) belvedere, with arched openings with imposts, extrados, keystones, small balustrades, and parapet with stepped cornice. The tower has rectangular windows to first floor level, surmounted by arched windows encircled in elaborately detailed Dutch gables. The Dutch gables have festooning and are interspersed with acroteria on pedestals. The tower makes a large footprint on the ground floor which frames the main entrance, and has arched openings with keystones.

The verandah which surrounds the building to north, east and partially to the west has timber boarded ceilings, fine lattice spandrels, and cast iron balustrades. It is supported on paired, chamfered posts with small curvilinear valances. On the northern frontage, substantial timber posts and bases with arched cast iron valances which are probably part of the 1885–86 building are located within the verandah.

Internally, Stanley Hall comprises grander rooms relating to the projecting bays at the ends of the building, interlinked by more modest and service rooms, accessed by central corridors on each level. The building contains finely crafted elements throughout. The centrally located main entrance has fine stained glass surrounds with a hibiscus motif. The entrance hall opens onto an impressive cedar staircase with richly turned and carved balusters and newels, and fine timber panels. The corridors to the ground floor have fluted cedar panels to dado level, and panelled cedar doors. The former dining room to the south has a fireplace with a richly carved timber mantelpiece, and fine hand-painted tiled hearth. The Drawing Room to the north has an arcade which separates a central rectangular space from peripheral pocket spaces formed by the projecting bays. The arcades have cast iron column on cedar-encased bases with floriated capitals, and extrados and keystones to the arches. The drawing room fireplace has richly carved surrounds. The "Prince of Wales" room immediately behind the Drawing Room has a marble mantelpiece, and tall timber doors opening onto the verandah. Amongst the ground floor service rooms is a former strong room which contains a substantial cast iron safe. The first floor contains bedrooms, and a former bathroom with an access hatch to the tower; these rooms command an excellent view of Eagle Farm.

Stanley Hall retains much of its earlier ironmongery, including push plates and locks which are more richly ornamented in living areas of the building and more plain in service areas.

The grounds of Stanley Hall to the north-east contain mature trees including camphor laurels, jacarandas, figs, palms, and several species of pines, which mark the boundaries, line the driveway and intersperse the grounds.

== Heritage listing ==
Stanley Hall was listed on the Queensland Heritage Register on 21 October 1992 having satisfied the following criteria.

The place is important in demonstrating the evolution or pattern of Queensland's history.

Stanley Hall survives as a substantially intact grand residence of the late 1880s and early 1890s in Brisbane. It was associated with two prominent Queensland pastoralists for over 35 years, and as their lavish town residence, well illustrates Queensland's former economic dependence on the pastoral industry.

The place is important in demonstrating the principal characteristics of a particular class of cultural places.

Stanley Hall survives as a substantially intact grand residence of the late 1880s and early 1890s in Brisbane. It was associated with two prominent Queensland pastoralists for over 35 years, and as their lavish town residence, well illustrates Queensland's former economic dependence on the pastoral industry.

The place is important because of its aesthetic significance.

Stanley Hall has a picturesque external form which reflects the stages of its construction and particular interests of its former owners, and contains some finely crafted internal elements. It is a fine example of the work of Brisbane architect GHM Addison.

The place has a special association with the life or work of a particular person, group or organisation of importance in Queensland's history.

Since 1926, the place has been associated with the work of the Catholic Church in female secondary education in Queensland.
