= Hubert George Octavius Thomas =

Australian architect (1857–1922)

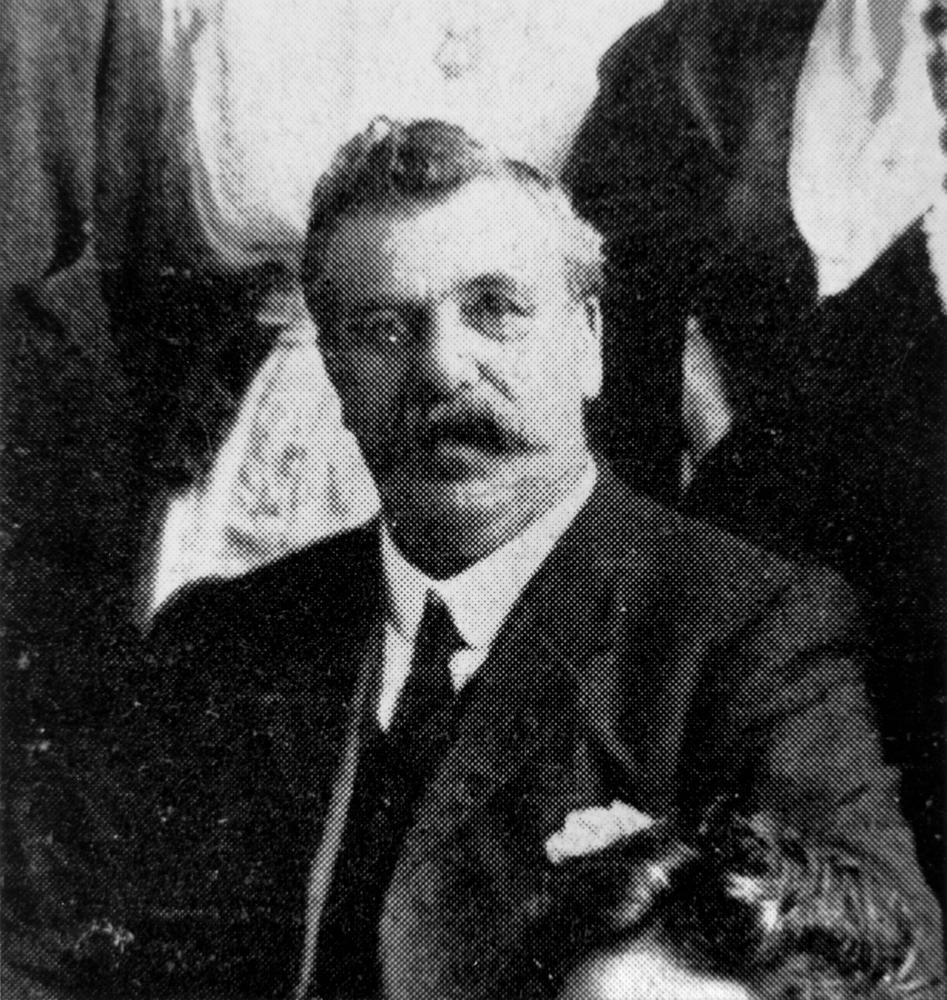
Portrait of H. G. O. Thomas

Hubert George Octavius Thomas (1857–1922) was an architect in Brisbane, Queensland, Australia. A number of his works are now heritage-listed.

== Early life ==
Hubert George Octavius Thomas was born in Aberystwyth, Wales in 1857. Thomas immigrated to Brisbane from Wales in 1883.

== Architectural career ==
Thomas practised as an architect in his own right from c.1885. From 1898 onwards he lived and practiced at Sandgate, where he served on the local School of Arts Committee. Specialising in urban villas, Thomas became a Member of the Society of Architects, London, in 1904, and a Fellow of the Queensland Institute of Architects c.1910.

== Later life ==
Thomas was the founder of the St David's Society in Brisbane (extant by 1918), and was its President at the time of his death. On 1 March 1922, he attended the annual dinner of the society. He was taken ill at the dinner and taken home where he died the following morning (2 March 1922).

His death was two days before the Woody Point Memorial School of Arts was officially opened.

== Works ==
Examples of his work include:

- 1888–89: the villa Dura (later Glengariff) in Hendra for Edward Jones
- c. 1900: the Bank of North Queensland, Childers (later the National Australia Bank)
- the 1919 additions to the Queen Alexandra Home in Coorparoo
- Woody Point Memorial School of Arts
