= Richard Frank Tunley =

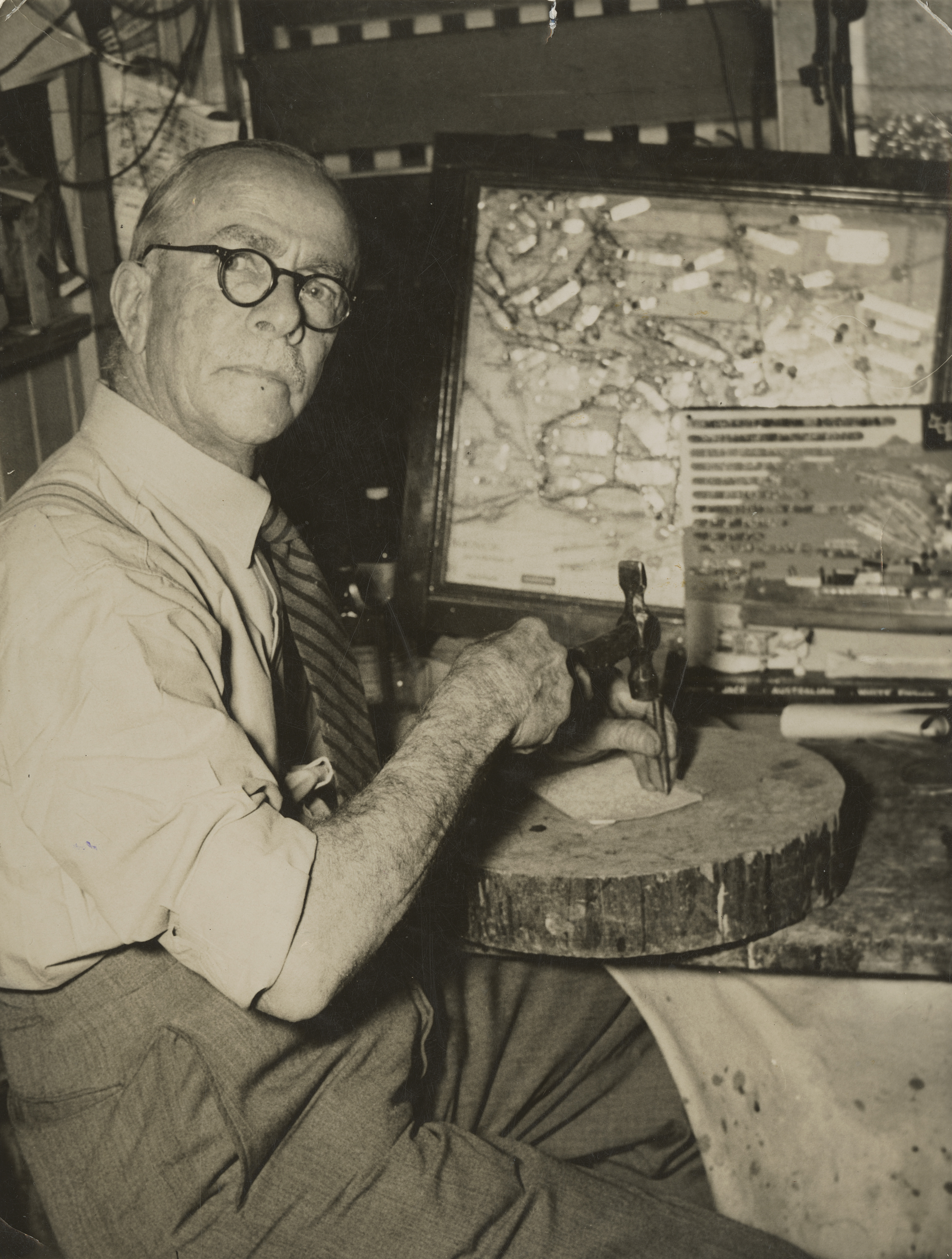
Frank Tunley creating braille maps and toys for the children of the School for the Blind at Annerley, Brisbane, circa. 1950

Richard Frank Tunley MBE, (1879–1968) was a blinds manufacturer and inventor of educational resources for visually impaired children in Queensland, Australia. He was a foundation member of the Blind, Deaf, and Dumb Institution and was central to the passage of the Blind, Deaf and Dumb Children Instruction Act of 1924 through the Parliament of Queensland which made education for visual and hearing impaired children compulsory in Queensland.

Tunley was born in Wolverhampton to William, a mercantile clerk, and Annie Tunley. In 1884 the family, which included ten children, emigrated to Australia and made their home on land they purchased on Stephens Street, South Brisbane. Eighteen months after their arrival William Tunley, aged 43, died.

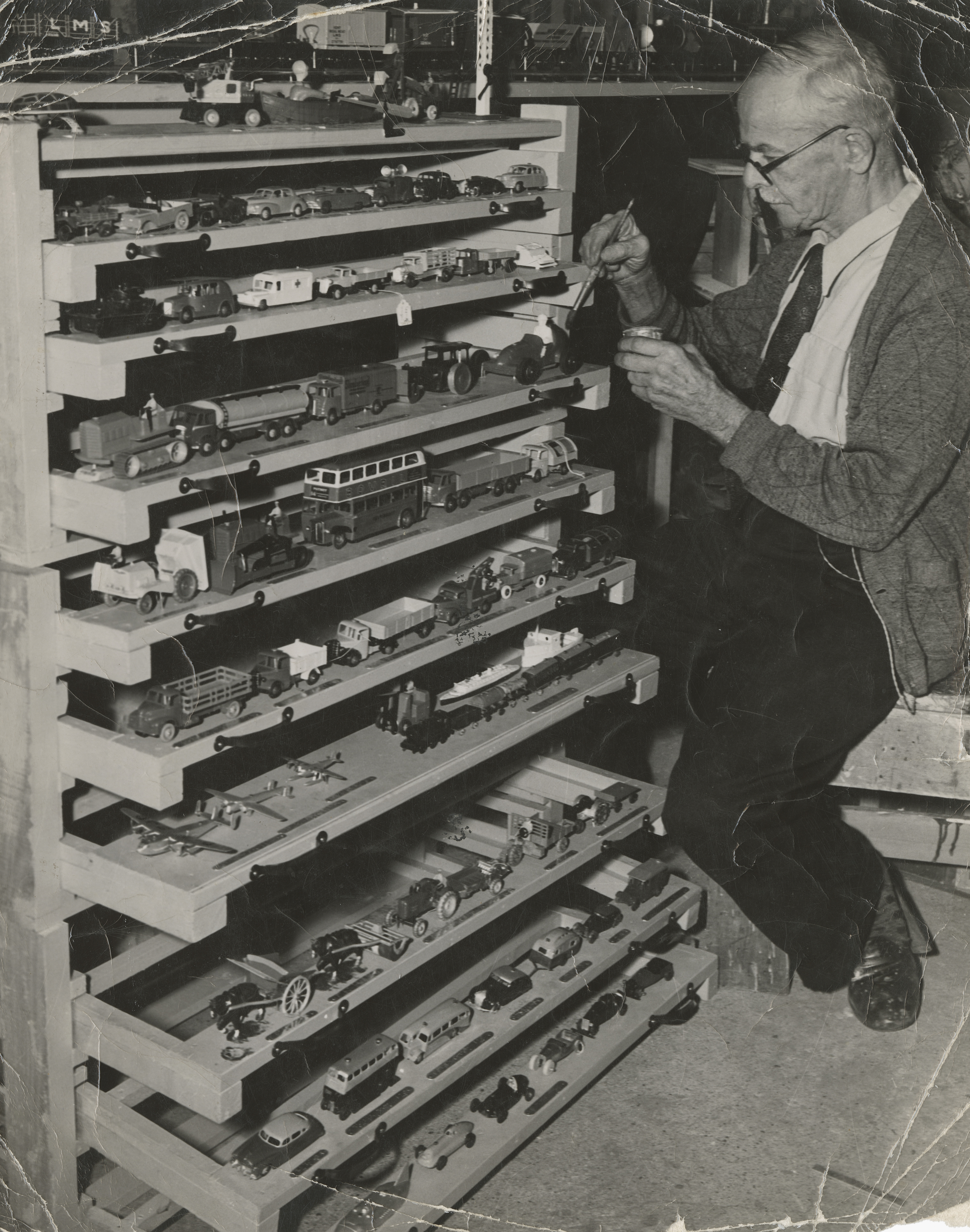
Gallery of model cars and planes used as teaching aids, circa 1950

Over a period of fifty years, Richard Tunley designed and made hundreds of educational resources and toys, which were tactile and adorned with metal plaques containing Braille descriptions, to assist visually impaired people perceive the world. He also wrote an illustrated booklet containing plans for his ships, bridges, maps, globes and toys to allow others to reproduce his inventions and formed the Queensland Braille Map and Model Club, whose members contributed to the manufacture of toys for blind children.

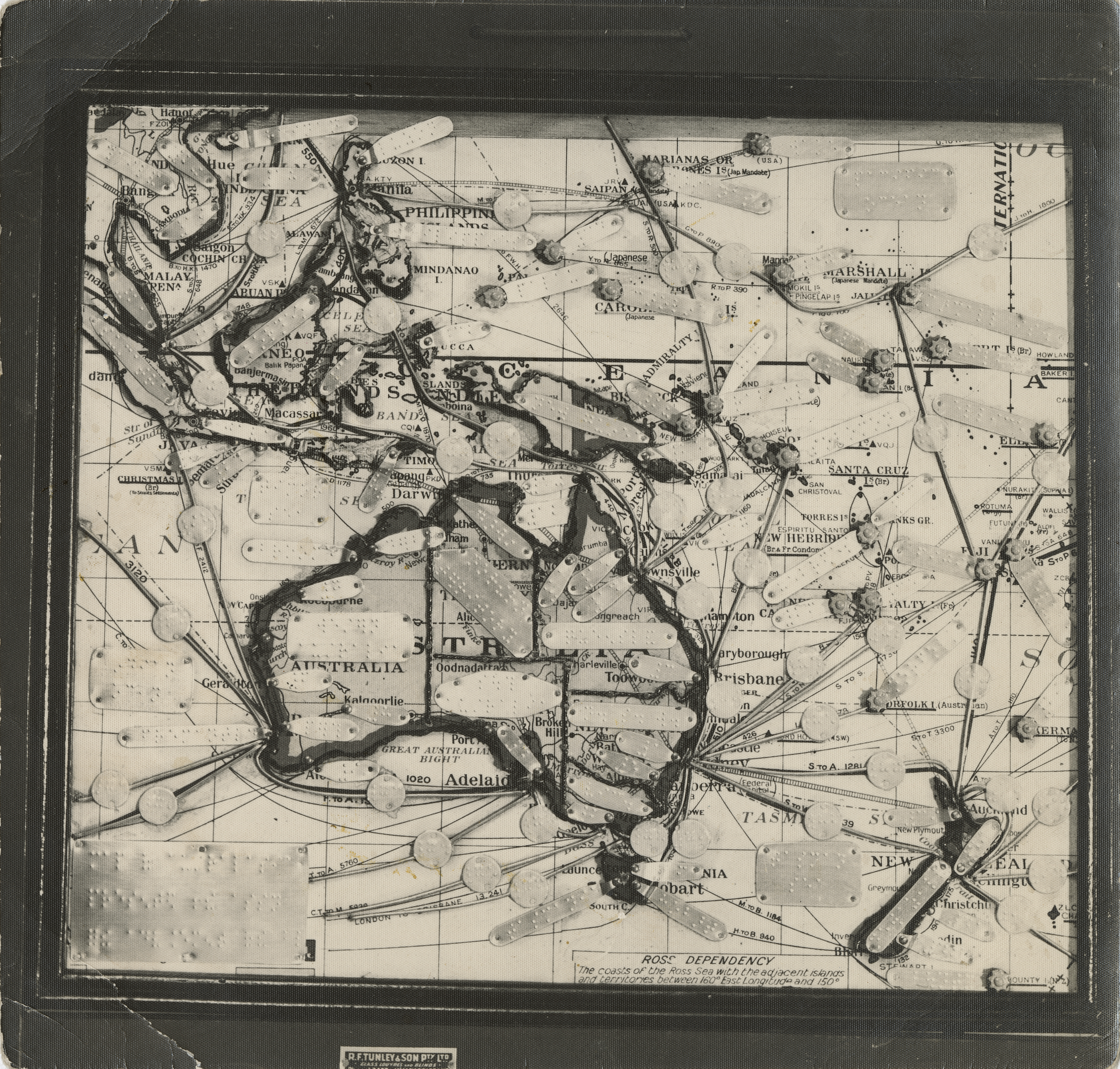
Braille map of Australasia by Tunley, circa 1940

Tunley commenced making maps for the blind when he became aware that there were no suitable tools available anywhere in the world that would help teach blind children geography. He made his first globe in 1923 and his first map in approximately 1925.

His maps were made from commercial paper maps applied to wood. The outline of the coastlines were then cut into the wood with boundaries, shipping routes and rivers delineated by twisted wire, studded corrugated wire strips and punched holes. Each map was labeled with aluminum plaques naming locations and features in Braille or, where a name was too long to be accommodated directly on the map, a number that corresponded to an accompanying key. The maps were distributed around the world as gifts, with Australia Post transporting them at no charge throughout the Commonwealth and at diminished cost for other destinations.

Among the educational toys Tunley made were scale models of streets containing shops in different architectural styles and featuring traffic lights and vehicles. He also constructed scale models of Brisbane City Hall, Sydney Harbour Bridge, Walter Taylor Bridge and Tower Bridge. Helen Keller visited an exhibition of his work on display at the offices of the Courier Mail during her visit to Brisbane in July 1948.

In the early 1950s, Tunley built a number of intricate nine roomed dollhouses which were given as gifts to blind schools and institutes in Australia. Each house took up to five months to build and was individually named, painted in bright colours, contained no sharp edges and featured intricate raised decorations in addition to the Braille plaques attached over the structure. Assistance in building some of the furniture was given by 15 year old Neil Magill.

In 1954 Tunley was awarded an Order of the British Empire for "services to deaf, dumb, and blind children."

He was featured in the Magnificent Makers exhibition at the State Library of Queensland in 2018.
