= List of closed railway stations in Brisbane =

This is a list of closed or inoperative passenger railway stations in Brisbane, Queensland, Australia.

Name	Suburb	Area	Opened	Closed	Coordinates	Notes
Airport						Became Eagle Farm railway station.
Albert						
Bowen Hills						The original location of the station.
Bowen Park						
Bunour						
Camp Mountain						
Dayboro						
Doboy	Brisbane	Brisbane	1889	1993	27°27′12″S 153°06′54″E	Named after Doughboy Creek, which was named in 1840. Originally named Birt's Siding, changed in 1910 to Buruda; renamed to Doboy in 1929. 'Doboy' was chosen over 'Doughboy' and 'Doboi' due to the latter names clashing with other place names in Australia. The platforms were installed in 1938. By the 1990s, most trains bypassed the station, with the exception of morning and afternoon trains for the workers at the local meatworks. It closed in 1993 following the closure of the meatworks.
Eagle Farm						Both; see page
Gloucester Street						
Holm's Halt						
Holmview						The original location of the station.
Mayne Junction						
Meeandah						
Newstead						
Normanby						
Northgate						The original location of the station.
Nyanda						
Pinkenba						
Riverton						
Samford						
Samsonvale						
Stanley Street			1884			
Tarragun				1890		
Thorroldtown	Wooloowin	Brisbane	1885	1890	————————	Closed due to their being 'so many stations', with Thorroldtown, Lutwyche, and Eagle Junction stations only being within 1,300 yards (1.2 km) of each other. An 1888 survey identified that Thorroldtown station only covered 2% of passengers out of all three stations. The closure of the station was met with controversy, and legal action was considered to try and save the station. It is between 500 yards (0.46 km) and 600 metres (0.60 km) north of the present Wooloowin Railway Station, which served as the replacement station after its closing.
Tennyson	Tennyson	Brisbane	1884	2011	27°31′32″S 153°00′17″E	Opened as Softstone Pocket railway station, re-named Tennyson in 1887. Reopening the station has been suggested, highlighting that it could improve public transport within the area.
Toowong Sports Ground	Toowong	Brisbane	c. 1888 (Note: This station appears to be a temporary station for the sixth annual Athletic Sports and Bicycle races event held on Saturday, 23 June 1888 at the Grounds and there is no mention of the station prior to this.)	1890	————————	It is believed the station did not have a station number. In June 1888, a platform for the station was erected for the sixth annual Athletic Sports and Bicycle races. Most trains did not stop at the station, with residents requesting morning and afternoon trains to stop at the station in February 1889, but the Rail Department declined due to the expense of constructing a station house and appointing a station officer. In July 1889, it was reported that the station generated 2s. 8d. in a 12-month period. The station was just opposite of the Sports Ground (now Oakman Park).
Woolloongabba	Woolloongabba	Brisbane	1884	1967	27°29′09″S 153°02′00″E	Constructed in 1884 and opened in June that year. Originally misspelled by the Railway Department as 'Woolongabba'. In 1889, maintaining the use of the station as a goods depot and enlarging the operations of the station for this purpose was accepted. The opening of a new line in 1891 saw the line bypass both Woolloongabba and Stanley Street stations. By 1894, the construction of a goods extension line was accepted, which saw access to Woolloongabba, with the line opening in 1897. However, in 1912, the return of passenger trains to the station was requested. The station was closed in 1967, while the goods yard closed in 1969.
Whinstanes	Hamilton	Brisbane	1897	c. 1970s	————————	The station was merged with Doomben in the 1970s.

== See also ==
- Queensland Rail
- List of South East Queensland railway stations
