= RAN Station 9, Pinkenba =

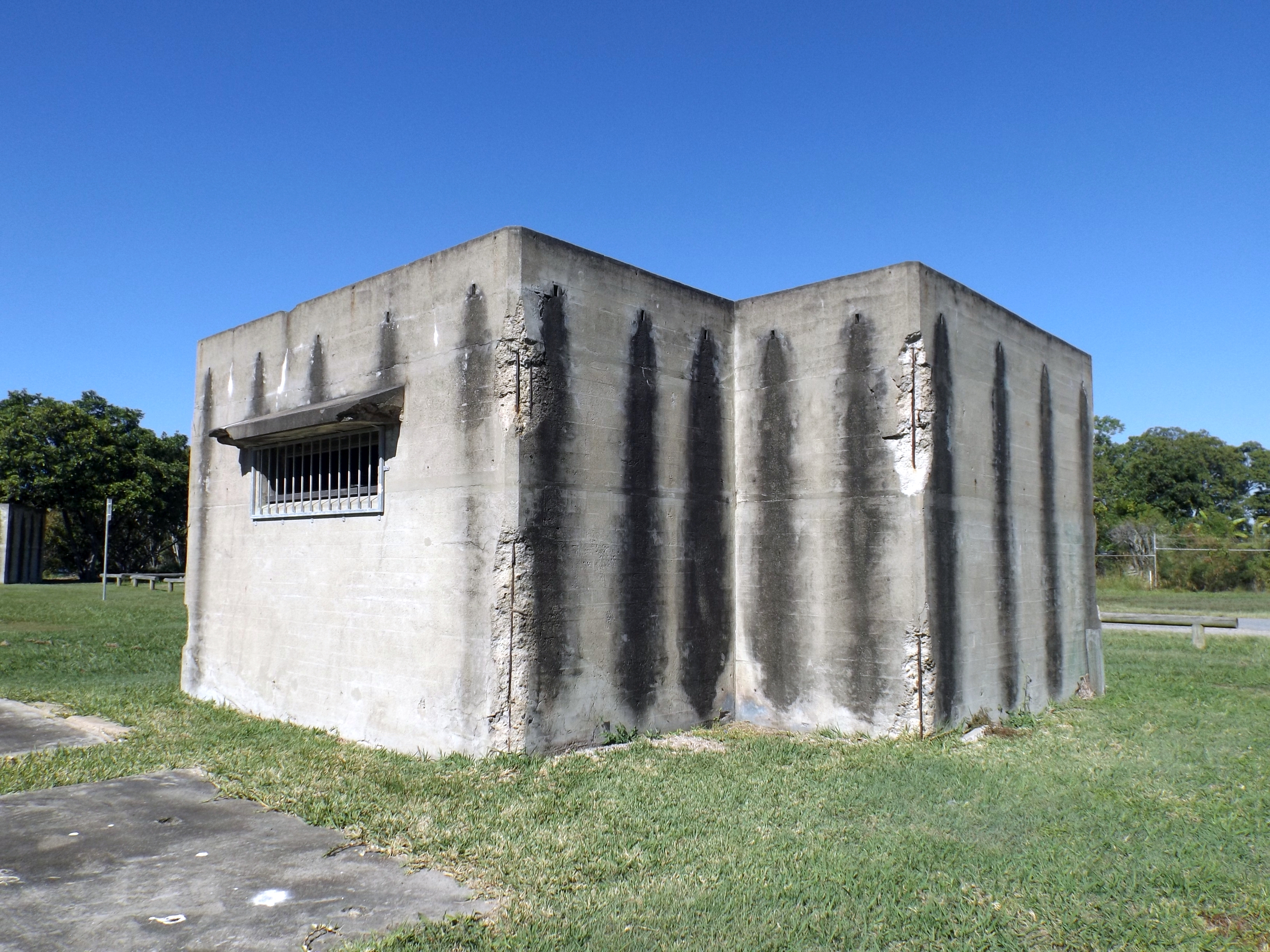
- Generator hut, 2015

- Location within Queensland Location within Australia
- 27.3913°S 153.1418°E
- Location: Myrtletown Reserve, Pinkenba, City of Brisbane, Queensland, Australia

History
- Design period: 1939–1945 (World War II)
- Built: 1940s

Site notes
- Architectural style: Brutalism

Queensland Heritage Register
- Official name: RAN Station 9, Pinkenba (Myrtletown)
- Type: state heritage (built)
- Designated: 17 July 2008
- Reference no.: 602448
- Significant period: 1940s
- Significant components: engine/generator shed/room / power supply, septic system, observation post (military), slab/s – concrete

RAN Station 9, Pinkenba is a heritage-listed naval station for submarine monitoring at Myrtletown Reserve, Pinkenba, City of Brisbane, Queensland, Australia. It was built in the 1940s. It is also known as RAN Station 9, Myrtletown. It was added to the Queensland Heritage Register on 17 July 2008.

== History ==
The remaining built elements of the Royal Australian Navy (RAN) Station 9, a World War II-era indicator loop and photo-electric (PE) beam monitoring complex, are located in Myrtletown Reserve, at the end of Gannon Road near Pinkenba. The concrete control and generator hut still stand at the southeast corner of the reserve, along with a number of concrete slabs from the quarters and mess building.

The site of RAN Station 9, located on the northern bank of Boggy Creek where it joins the Brisbane River, was gazetted as a Reserve for Recreation in 1885. A Reserve for Landing was located just to the north, and both reserves were initially under the control of the Toombul Divisional Board. In January 1925 both reserves, now jointly known as Myrtletown Reserve (3.55 hectares (8.8 acres)), were transferred to the Brisbane City Council, which remains the trustee. The Myrtletown area, formerly an agricultural district, is now an industrial zone, with large undeveloped blocks and few houses. Most residents left due to the closure of the local school in 1971 and the construction of Brisbane Airport nearby (which opened in 1988).

During World War II the coastal artillery defences of Moreton Bay were upgraded. These included Fort Lytton (1880–1881) (now Fort Lytton National Park) on the southern side of the Brisbane River's mouth and Fort Cowan Cowan (late 1930s) (Fort Cowan Cowan), on the west side of Moreton Island. Fort Bribie (Bribie Island Second World War Fortifications), at the northeast tip of Bribie Island, was established in 1939 after Germany's invasion of Poland plunged the world into war. Japan's entry into the war on 7 December 1941, and the consequent perceived invasion threat to Australia, led to a further expansion of Moreton Bay's defences. Fort Bribie upgraded its two 6" gun emplacements in early 1942, and in June 1942, the Commander of the Allied Naval Forces in the Southwest Pacific Area requested as a matter of high priority that Moreton Bay be developed as a naval operating base. Later that year two American 155-millimetre (6.1 in) field guns were emplaced on Panama Mounts at Skirmish Point (Bribie Island Second World War Fortifications), at the south end of Bribie Island. In 1943 a similar battery was built at Rous, on the east side of Moreton Island.

The major access route into the Brisbane River was the Northwest Channel, which ran from near Caloundra across the bay in a southeast direction (east of Bribie Island and towards Moreton Island) and then southwest towards the mouth of the Brisbane River, forming a Z-shaped route. This dictated the ideal positions for coastal artillery batteries, with the most effective sites for guns being the closest points to the channel bends. However, Rous battery was designed to deter ships from shelling targets within Moreton Bay from the ocean side of Moreton Island.

During World War II, Moreton Bay was also protected by RAN stations numbers 1 through 10. RAN 1 was a Port War Signal Station at Wickham Point, Caloundra (not extant), and RAN 2 was a Controlled Mining and Guard Loop Station which was initially located at Fort Bribie (extant), before it was moved to Tangalooma on Moreton island in 1943 (not extant). RAN 3 was a Controlled Mining and Guard Loop Station at Cowan Cowan, and RAN 4 was the Indicator Loop and Harbour Defence ASDIC (anti-submarine detection sonar) Station at Woorim (Bribie Island Second World War Fortifications), on Bribie Island (extant). RAN 5 was the Combined Training Centre (Naval Wing), at Toorbul; RAN 6 was an Advanced Fairmile Base (AFMB) at Bongaree, Bribie Island; and RAN 7 was an Indicator Loop and Harbour Defence ASDIC Station at Bulwer on Moreton Island (extant). On the Brisbane River, RAN 8 was the Boom Defence Facility, an anti-submarine boom across the Brisbane River between Lytton and Bulwer Island (not extant); RAN 9 was the Indicator Loop and Photo-electric Beam Station, Myrtletown (extant); and RAN 10 was a Naval Store at Pinkenba (status unknown).

Indicator loops were used to detect the presence of any submerged submarines. An indicator loop relies on the production of an induced current in a stationary loop of wire when a magnet moves overhead. Even if wiped or degaussed, submarines still have sufficient magnetism to produce a small current in a loop. The technology was developed by the British Royal Navy at HMS Osprey (Portland Naval Base) from 1915. If an indicator loop showed the presence of a vessel the two possibilities were "sub" or "non-sub". If no ship could be observed on the water, it was obviously a submarine, and a vessel could be despatched to drop depth charges.

Alternatively, if an indicator loop was located next to a controlled minefield, in which the mines were connected by electrical cable back to a mine control hut on shore, the mines could be detonated manually if a submarine was detected. It had to be an enemy submarine as friendly submarines always entered port surfaced. The controlled mines in Moreton Bay were accompanied by "guard" indicator loops and mine loops. When a submarine was detected by the guard loop, the operator would wait until there was also a galvanometer "swing" on the mine loop and then the mines would be detonated by sending a current down the mine loop.

RAN Station 9 was designed to detect any Japanese submarines or surface vessels attempting to navigate up the Brisbane River. By 1942, the navy had become aware of recent developments by Japan, Germany and Italy in the manufacture and use of miniature submarines and human torpedoes. Existing indicator loop systems had legs set at a 200-yard spacing which was fine for large submarines but useless for the miniatures. By September 1942 the RAN decided to lay a miniature indicator loop across the mouth of the Brisbane River.

The indicator loop cables were laid in a miniature indicator loop pattern with legs 40 yards (37 m) apart, from RAN Station 9 to Fisherman Islands. If a submerged submarine was detected by RAN Station 9 a signal would be transmitted to RAN Station 8, the Boom Defence Facility at Fort Lytton, to raise the boom cable. HMAS Kinchela was permanently moored in the Brisbane River as part of this Boom Defence system. The indicator loop was completed by HMAS Bangalow by early March 1943.

The indicator loop was supplemented with a photo-electric beam above the water, to detect the presence of surface vessels entering the Brisbane River. RAN Station 9 in Brisbane was one of only three photo-electric beam installations built in Australia during World War II, the others being between South Head and Middle Head in Sydney, and between Point Lonsdale and Point Nepean at Port Phillip in Melbourne. Lieutenant Colonel Buckland of the Australian Army was responsible for the installation of all three.

The PE Beam equipment consisted of a transmitter on the Fisherman Islands side of the Brisbane River housed in a concrete hut, at a bearing of 68 degrees and 25 minutes from the receiver at Myrtletown. The current status of the transmitting hut is unknown, due to the development of wharfage facilities around that location. The PE beam transmitter consisted of a power valve that transmitted in the visible and infrared wavelengths. An infrared screen blocked out the visible light so that it couldn't be seen from the outside. The beam from the transmitter was directed at the reflector (a 90 centimetres (35 in) parabolic mirror) in the control hut at Myrtletown, which focussed the rays to a pin point on the cathode of the PE cell.

Breaking the beam closed a contactor on to an 80 Volt DC supply and connected it in parallel with a service contactor. While the beam was in normal operation, a loudspeaker gave a buzzing note. When the beam was broken, the speaker reproduced the clicking of the receiver relay. An alarm buzzer also sounded and a flashing red light came on actuated by the relay. During this interruption, another contactor closed and a sentry (searchlight) was exposed across the river, on a bearing a few degrees inside the line of the infrared PE beam. The service contactor switch for the searchlight was then closed by the switchman, who carried out a quick search of the area; the control panel contactor being immediately reset by pressing a button on the control panel. Resetting stopped the alarm buzzer, flashing light and the clicking in the loudspeaker, leaving the apparatus ready to give another signature immediately.

The PE beam was completed in September 1943 and on 23 October 1943 the first trial of the beam was undertaken. RAN Station 9 commenced operation in January 1944, after a construction cost of £3337. Lieutenant Joe Duggan was the Officer in Charge.

RAN Station 9 never detected any Japanese intruders, although submarines had been sighted east of Stradbroke Island (March 1942) and off Moreton Island (June 1942), and on 14 May 1943 the hospital ship Centaur was struck by a torpedo and sunk off the Brisbane coastline. The last attack to occur in the approaches to the Port of Brisbane took place on 4 June 1943 off Cape Moreton, when a Japanese submarine fired on the American ship MV Edward Chambers. The indicator loop in the Brisbane River was removed in June 1945.

A 1946 aerial photograph of the RAN Station 9 facility shows that the quarters and mess building were located to the north of the control and generator huts (at the location of the existing concrete slabs and brick cisterns). Two outhouses were located northwest of the existing generator hut. The larger of the two remaining structures, the control hut, accommodated the indicator loop and PE beam instrumentation and was where the loop cables terminated. The smaller building housed the generator. The living quarters for officers and ordinary ranks were separated by a mess area.

== Description ==
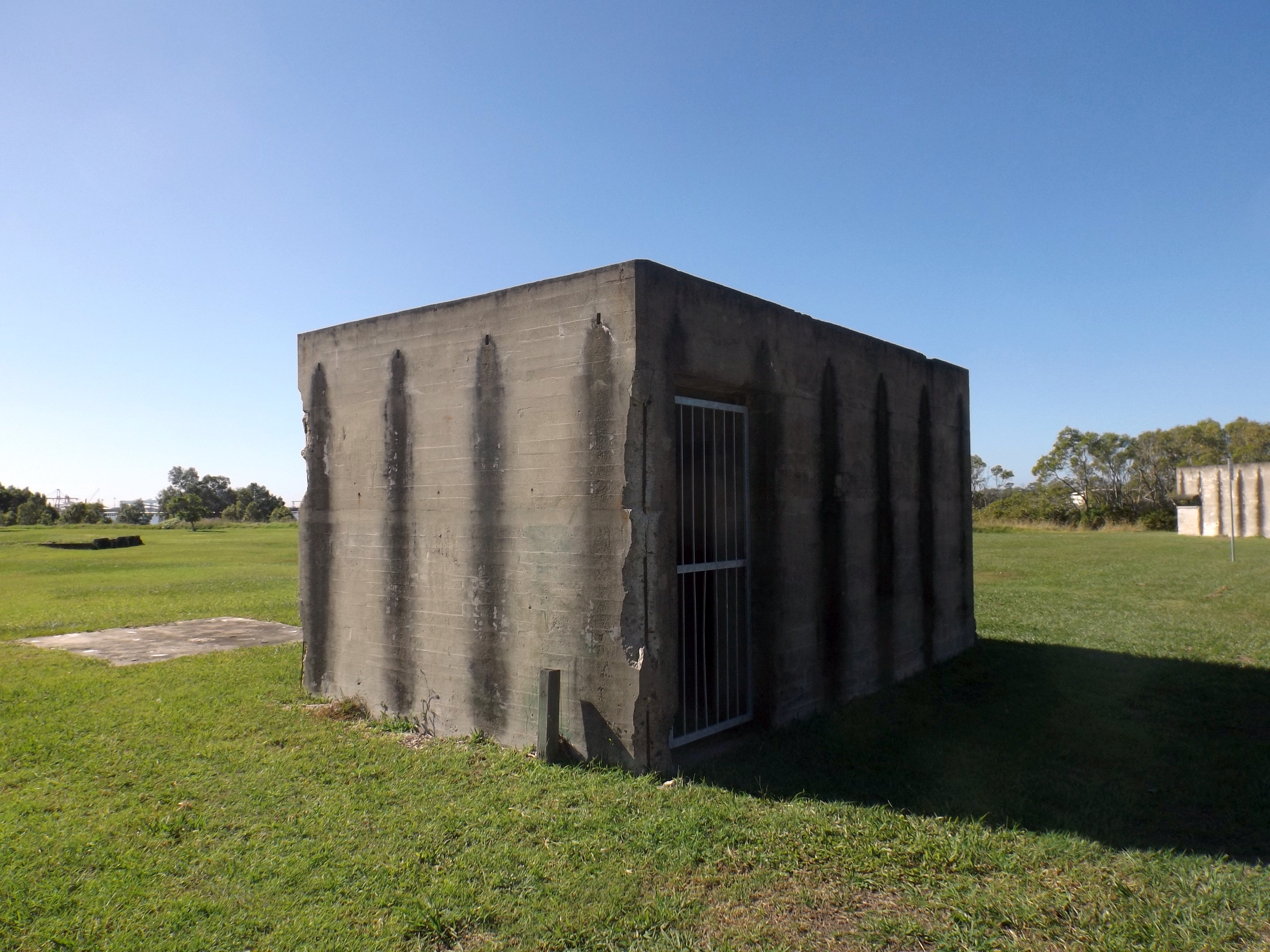
Control hut, 2015

The surviving structures of the former RAN Station 9 stand at the southeast corner of a reserve at the end of Gannon Road in Myrtletown. A rough dirt roadway continues from the end of Gannon Road along the southwest edge of the reserve, and Sandmere Road is gazetted but unformed along the northwest side of the reserve. The reserve contains two concrete buildings, with other ruined concrete structures and concrete slabs to the north. The wartime concrete structures contrast with the green and peaceful nature of the well-groomed riverside park.

The buildings are single-storey rectangular concrete structures with flat concrete roofs concealed by the parapet edges formed by the perimeter walls. The structures were cast in-situ and the walls and ceilings display an off-form finish. Glazing has been lost to all the window openings and most doors are lost. Steel grill security screens have been fixed to all openings.

The control hut is made of concrete 12 inches (300 mm) thick and is approximately 19 by 22 feet (5.8 by 6.7 m). It stands close to the park edge at Boggy Creek, aligned southwest-northeast. The rectangular plan is divided into even quarters with three enclosed rooms and an open entry courtyard in the southwest quarter. There are two doorways off the open courtyard, protected by a freestanding blast wall. The door to the northwest opens into a fully enclosed room (former workshop and store) which connects to a room to the northeast (former indicator loop room). The storeroom contains an uninstalled louvered timber door, leant up against the wall. The indicator loop room has a single narrow unglazed observation window at eye height on the northeast corner. This narrow opening is sheltered by an external cantilevered tapered concrete hood.

The door to the northeast of the courtyard leads into a room at the southeast corner of the building (PE beam receiver room). The floor level of this room is below the ground level and is reached by a small flight of concrete stairs. The PE Beam receiver room has a large low unglazed window opening to the northeast (PE beam opening) and a larger window/doorway to the southeast. Many of the wall openings in the structure contain remnants of timber framing. A concrete slab and kerbing lie to the south and west of the structure.

To the northwest of the control hut is the concrete generator hut, which is about 18 feet (5.5 m) by 18 feet 6 inches (5.64 m). The generator hut consists of a large rectangular room (generator room) and an adjacent smaller narrow rectangular room (store) both opening onto a small enclosed rectangular entrance corridor with an external door to the southwest corner. The generator room has long narrow unglazed windows at eye height to the northeast and southeast. Both openings have external cantilevered tapered concrete hoods. One opening contains the timber window frame. The interior of the generator room contains a concrete mounting on the floor, as well as some freestanding thick timber framing. Two rectangular concrete slabs lie northeast of the generator hut.

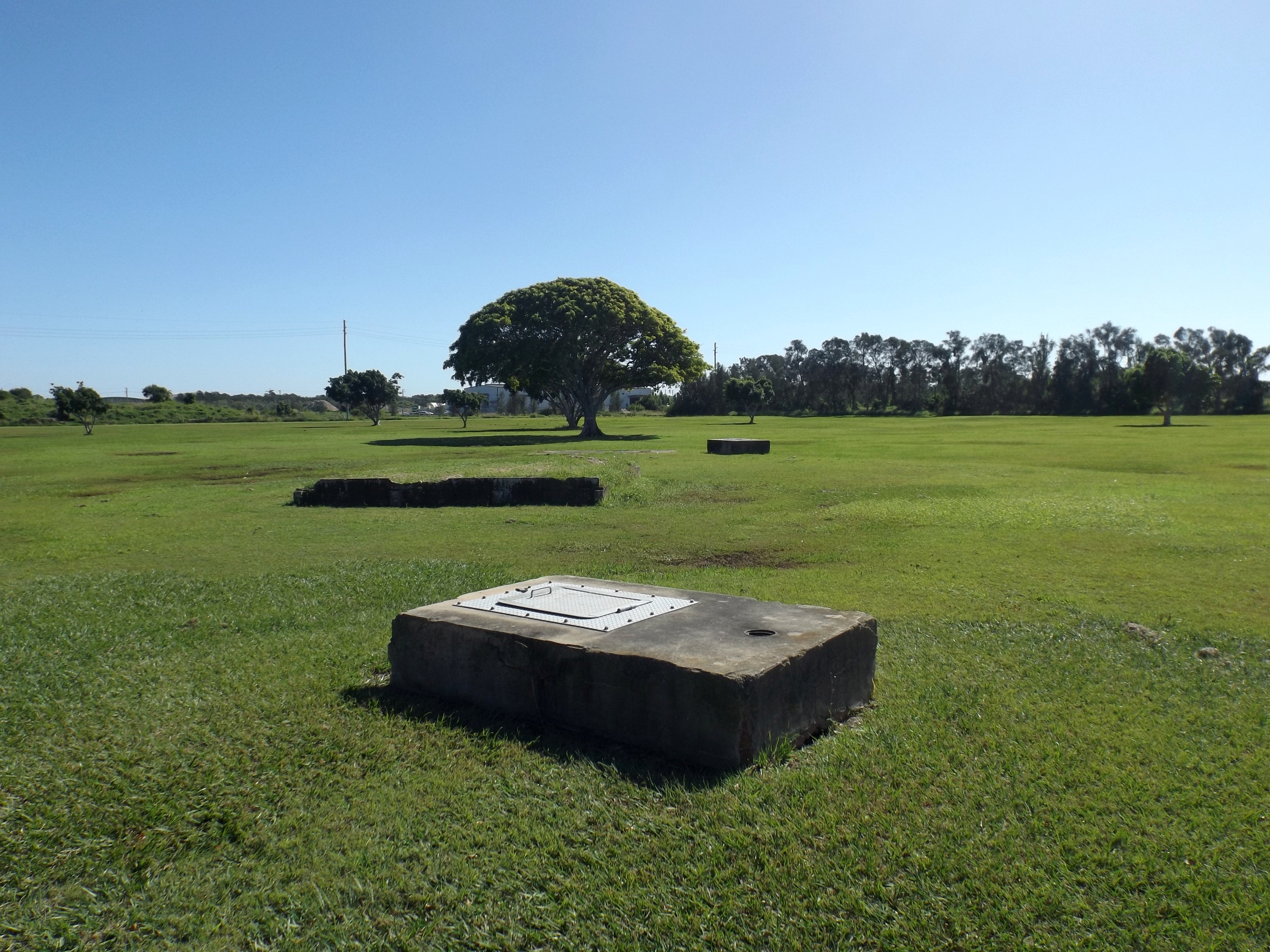
Park and concrete slabs, 2015

There is a scatter of trees, a picnic shelter and barbeque facilities to the northwest of the two concrete huts, but these features are not considered to be of cultural heritage significance. To the north of the huts is a rectangular raised area with remnant low concrete walls, with a concrete slab to its northwest. These features mark the site of the quarters and mess building. Located to the north and south ends of the quarters site, to its northeast, are two rectangular brick cisterns, rendered with concrete. Each has a round pipe opening on top of one end, and a modern metal cover with a hatch at the other end. The cisterns were probably the septic systems for the living quarters.

== Heritage listing ==
RAN Station 9, Pinkenba (Myrtletown) was listed on the Queensland Heritage Register on 17 July 2008 having satisfied the following criteria.

The place is important in demonstrating the evolution or pattern of Queensland's history.

The surviving concrete huts and the concrete remnants of the quarters and mess building at RAN Station 9 at Pinkenba (Myrtletown) are important in demonstrating the pattern of Queensland's history, being surviving evidence of the efforts made to defend Moreton Bay and the Brisbane River against enemy ships and submarines during World War II. The indicator loop and photo-electric beam installation at Myrtletown was part of an interlocking system of naval defences for Moreton Bay, which incorporated coastal artillery batteries, indicator loops, controlled minefields, ASDIC (anti-submarine sonar detection) devices, Fairmile anti-submarine motor launches, a photoelectric (PE) beam and an anti-submarine boom.

The place demonstrates rare, uncommon or endangered aspects of Queensland's cultural heritage.

RAN Station 9 was one of only three PE beam harbour defence installations constructed in Australia during World War II. The others were constructed between South Head and Middle Head in Sydney, and between Point Lonsdale and Point Nepean at Port Phillip in Melbourne.

The place is important in demonstrating the principal characteristics of a particular class of cultural places.

RAN Station 9, by its location, orientation to the river, and room layout, is important in demonstrating the principal characteristics of a World War II indicator loop and PE beam station, an anti-submarine defence. Its location next to the Brisbane River demonstrates the need to detect enemy vessels attempting to infiltrate upriver, and the placement of the control hut reveals the bearing of the PE beam transmitted from Fisherman Islands. The layout of the rooms in the control hut provide evidence of the functions of such a facility, with the indicator loop room having an observation window over the river and the PE beam room having a large window to receive the beam transmitted from Fisherman Islands.

The place is important because of its aesthetic significance.

As incongruous concrete structures in a quiet area of flat, well maintained grassland along the north bank of Boggy Creek as it joins the Brisbane River, the remaining buildings and foundations of RAN Station 9 are a picturesque but poignant reminder of attempts to defend shipping in the Brisbane River from Japanese submarine attacks.
