= Bunour railway station =

Former railway station in Brisbane, Queensland, Australia

Bunour
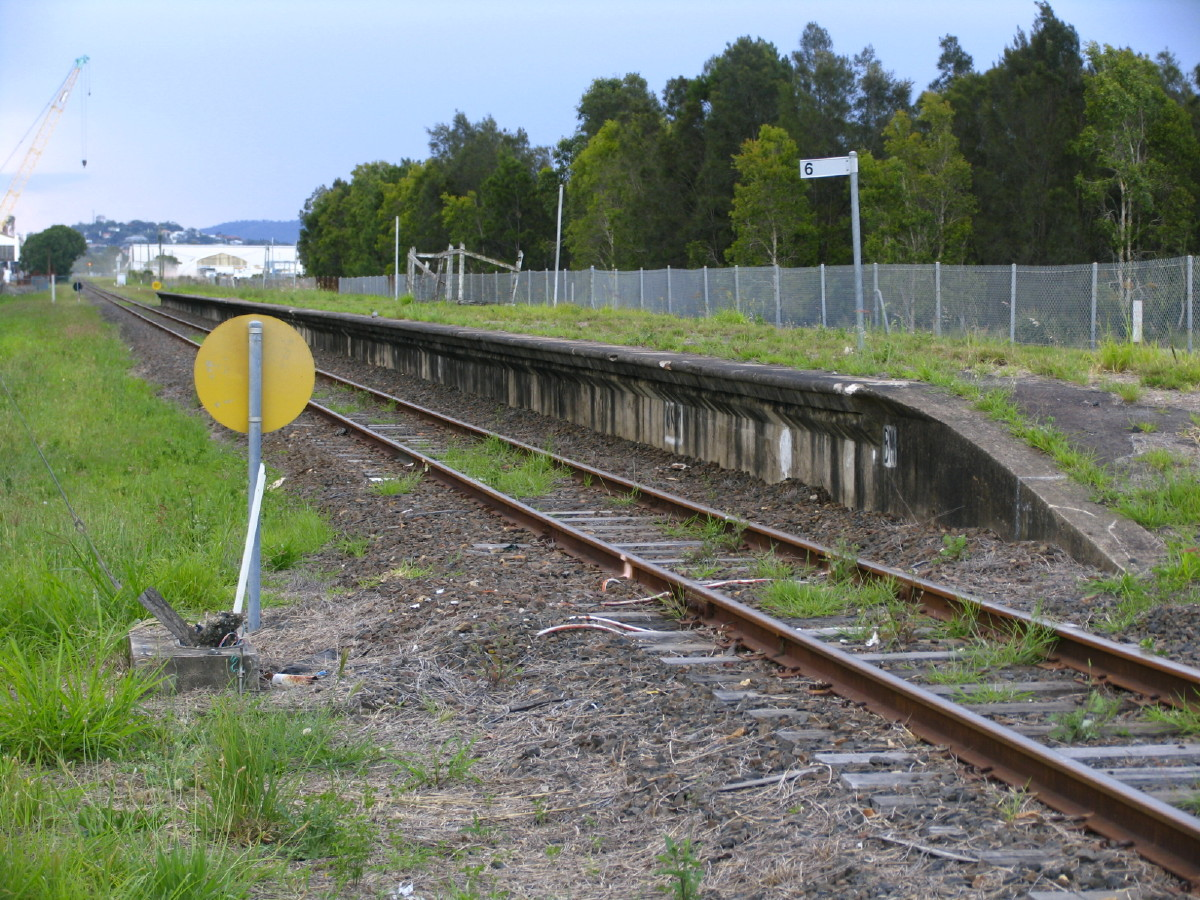

General information
- Location: Kingsford Smith Drive, Eagle Farm
- Coordinates: 27.4281°S 153.0986°E
- Owner: Queensland Rail
- Line: Pinkenba line
- Platforms: 1 side platform
- Connections: Bus

Other information
- Fare zone: 2

History
- Opened: 1949
- Closed: 27 September 1993

Services
Preceding station	Queensland Rail	Following station
Eagle Farm towards Roma Street	Pinkenba line	Meeandah towards Pinkenba
Location

Bunour railway station is an abandoned railway station on the Pinkenba railway line on the boundary between the suburbs of Eagle Farm and Pinkenba in the City of Brisbane, Queensland, Australia. The station is 8.1 kilometres (5.0 mi) from the Brisbane central business district and 12.4 kilometres (7.7 mi) from Central station by rail. It opened in 1949 and closed on 27 September 1993.

The name is derived from the Aboriginal name for the black and white Australian white ibis bird.

== History ==
The line to Pinkenba opened on 1 April 1897, and Bunour railway station opened in 1949 for workers in the growing industrial area.

A large army camp defense storage and warehouse facility, used during World War II (1939 to 1945), is located beside the site of Bunour railway station and remains today as the Damascus Barracks.

In 1988 the Pinkenba line was electrified, however only as far as the prior Eagle Farm station; infrequent passenger services consisting of stainless steel carriages hauled by diesel locomotives operated through Bunour. On 27 September 1993, all passenger services on the line were suspended as part of a rationalisation of the state rail network with the suspending or closing of unprofitable and under-utilised rail lines by the Goss Labor Party state government.

== Current status ==
The original low-level platform is all that remains of Bunour railway station today.

=== Replacement bus service ===
The bus stop for the replacement Translink bus service (303) is immediately beside Bunour station in Kingsford Smith Drive.

== See also ==
- Queensland Rail City network
- TransLink (Queensland)
