= Pinkenba War Memorial =

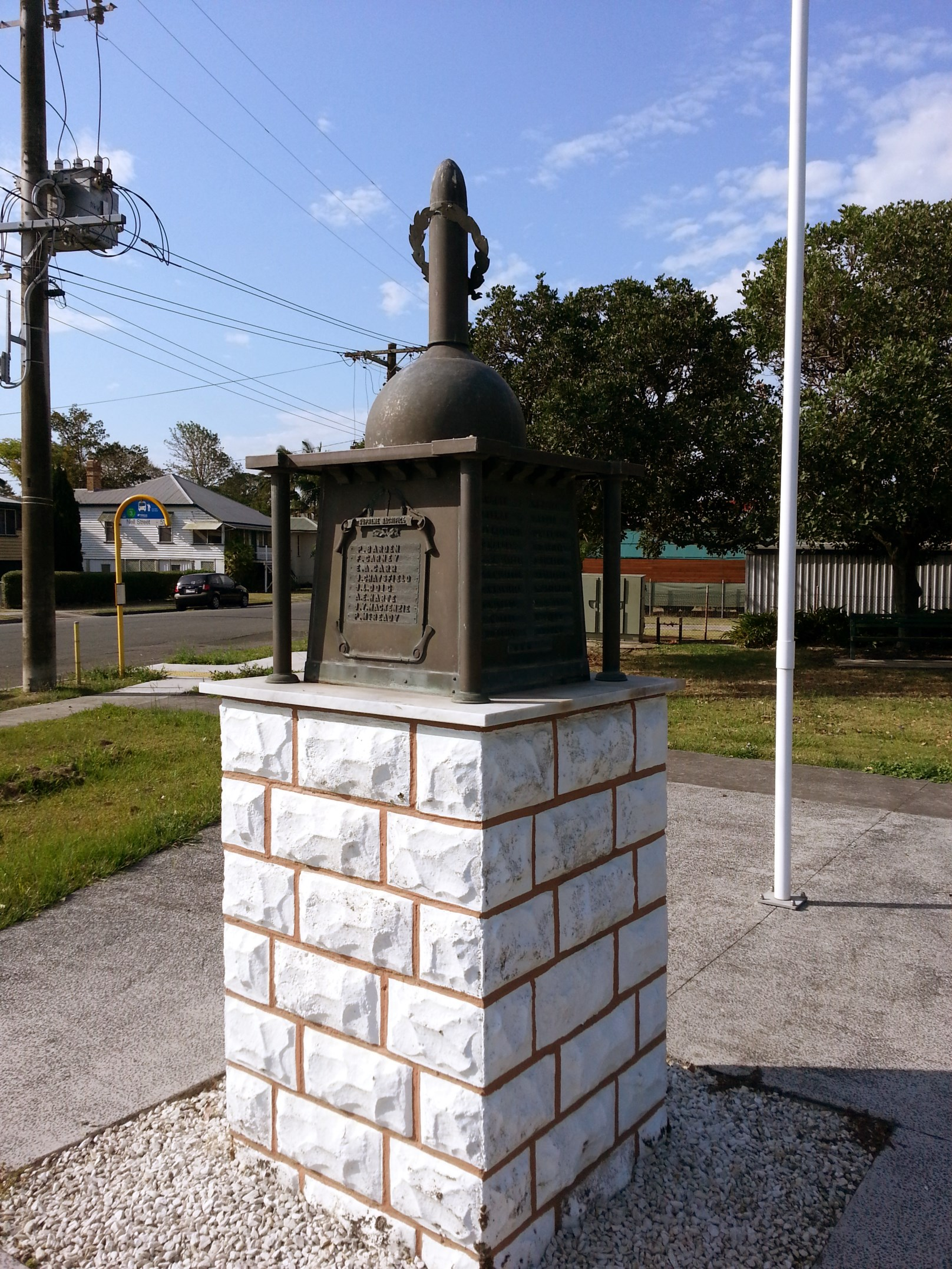
- Pinkenba War Memorial, 2013

- Location within Queensland Location within Australia
- 27.4235°S 153.1189°E
- Location: Eagle Farm Road, Pinkenba, City of Brisbane, Queensland, Australia

History
- Design period: 1919–1930s (interwar period)
- Built: 1925

Site notes
- Architect: Ernest Gunderson
- Architectural style: Classicism

Queensland Heritage Register
- Official name: Pinkenba War Memorial
- Type: state heritage (built)
- Designated: 3 October 2005
- Reference no.: 602453
- Significant period: 1920s (fabric)
- Significant components: memorial – pillar/s, fence/wall – perimeter, trees/plantings, garden – bed/s, flagpole/flagstaff

Pinkenba War Memorial is a heritage-listed memorial at Eagle Farm Road, Pinkenba, City of Brisbane, Queensland, Australia. It was designed by Ernest Gunderson and built in 1919. It was added to the Queensland Heritage Register on 3 October 2005.

== History ==
Pinkenba War Memorial is located on a small triangular portion of land at the intersection of McBride Road and Eagle Farm Road at Pinkenba. It was unveiled on 16 August 1919, by His Excellency Governor Sir Hamilton Goold-Adams. It was erected to commemorate the men from the district who had served during World War I.

A small community existed at Pinkenba as early as the 1860s when the residents began discussing the need for a school in the district. A formal application for a school, lodged in 1874, listed 22 families with children living in the area. The early residents largely comprised small farmers, many of them of German origin. From the late nineteenth century, the abattoir of the Queensland Meat Export Company was located at Pinkenba and it remained a major employer in the district until after WWI. The wharves, servicing passenger and freight ships, were also a hub of commercial activity. In 1897, a rail link was provided to service the wharves, industries and residents of Pinkenba.

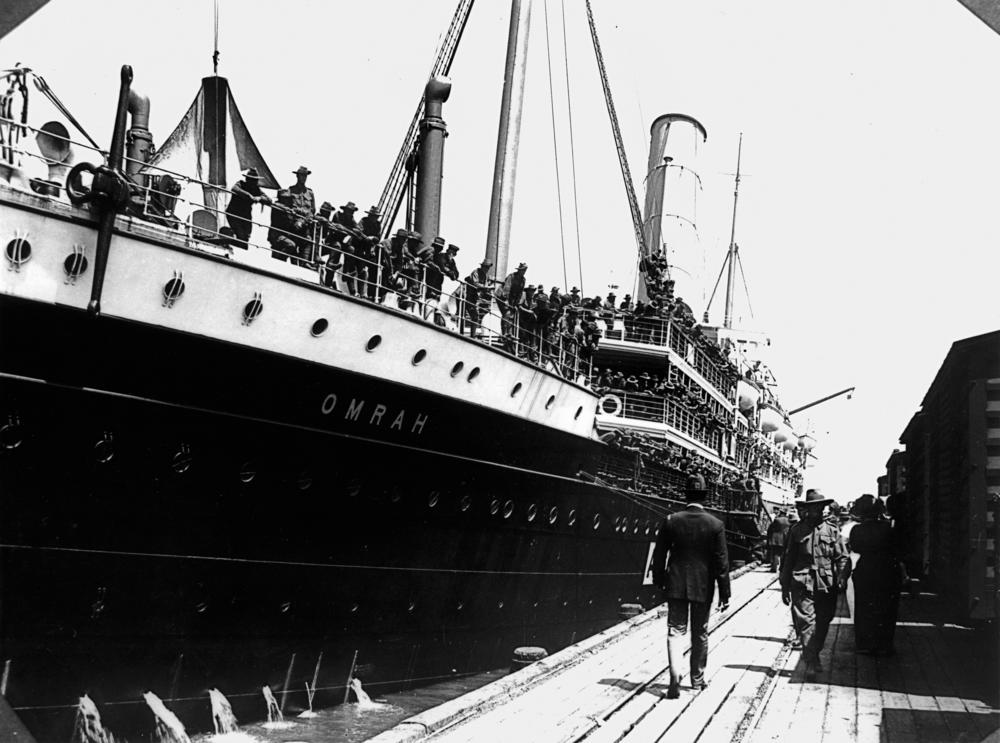
Australian troops on board the Omrah (ship) at Pinkenba Wharf, circa 1915

During WWI, the Pinkenba wharves were the point of embarkation for many Australian troops, including members of the Australian Light Horse. Pupils from the local school visited the wharves to farewell soldiers from the district. The Pinkenba War Memorial records the names of 42 men who enlisted, eight of whom are listed as fallen.

The memorial was designed and constructed by the Queensland firm of Ernest Gunderson. Gunderson was a skilled tradesman of Norwegian extraction whose firm specialized in the manufacture of bronze honour boards. The firm operated until the mid 1930s and supplied memorials all over Queensland. His best-known and largest memorial is in the main street of Gayndah. At the time of its unveiling, it was described as one of the finest in the State.

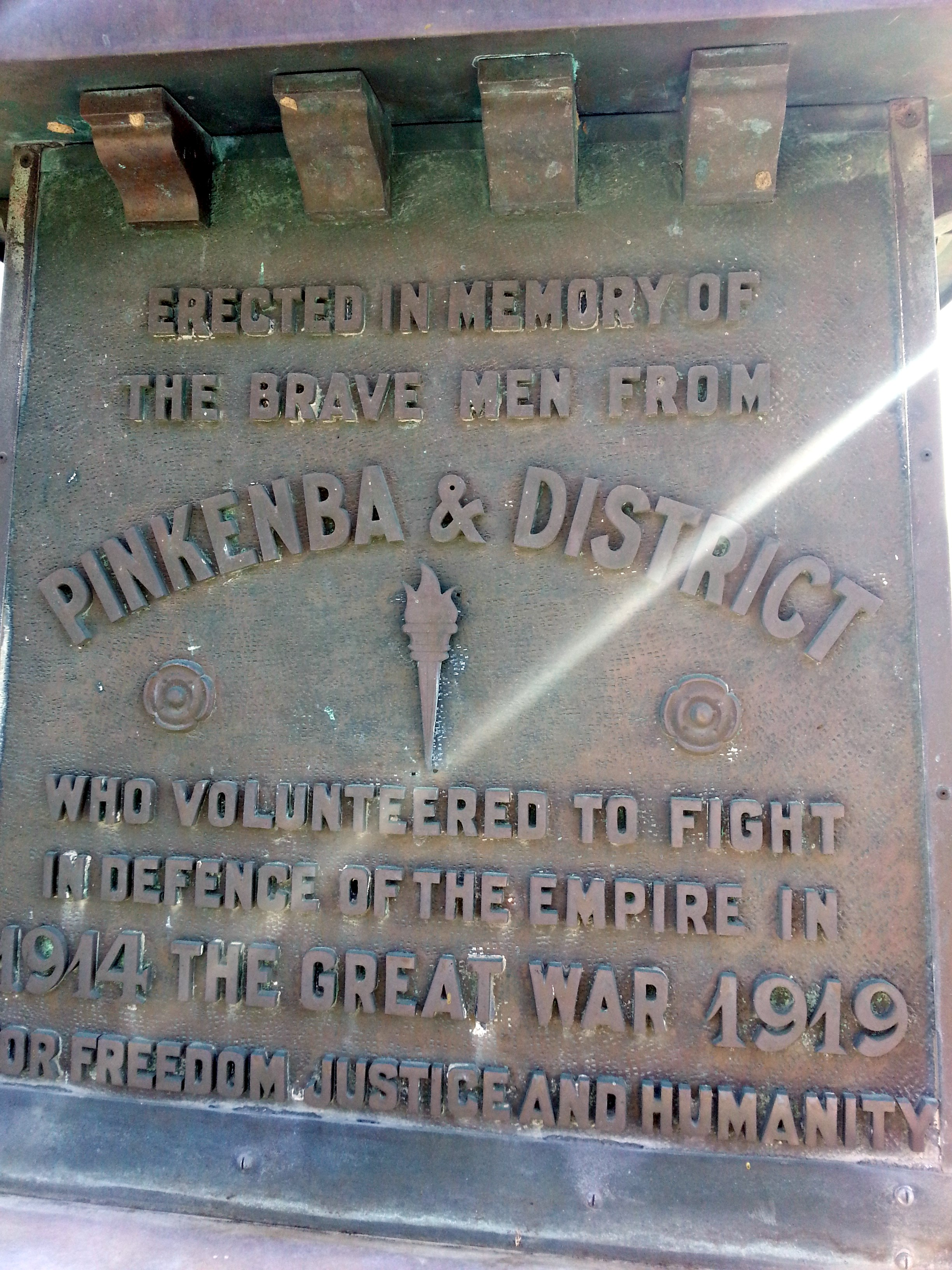
Commemorating the servicemen from the district

Gunderson individually moulded decorative devices for his honour boards and these make them quite distinctive as a Queensland type. The Pinkenba monument features similar devices including an artillery shell encircled by a wreath. There were also a series of statuettes fixed to the monument that were removed, probably before World War II. These included mounted light horsemen located on each corner above the columns and a statuette of a soldier that stood to the north of the dome.

In 1983, Brisbane City Council plumbers and sheet metal workers repaired some of the damage sustained by the monument. However, important elements including the statuettes and some lettering remain lost.

In the 1960s, the character of Pinkenba changed. Many residents moved out of the area as homes were resumed to make way for proposed Eagle Farm Airport expansion. More heavy industry moved into the suburb. The War Memorial remains a vestige of the earlier more residential character of the area.

== Description ==
The monument stands on a small, grassed triangular portion of road reserve at the corner of Eagle Farm and McBride Roads, Pinkenba. Approximately 2.5 metres (8 ft 2 in) high, it stands within a grassed area defined by a white painted concrete curb supporting a fence of hollow metal poles linked by metal chain. A flagstaff stands to the north within the fenced area.

The bronze memorial is supported on a plinth of cast rusticated-finish concrete blocks. A pedestal, similar in form to the base of a truncated obelisk comprising beaten panels with a Doric column at each corner sits on top of the plinth. It supports a square platform surmounted by a small dome. An upright artillery shell, hung with a frail bronze wreath, projects from the dome.

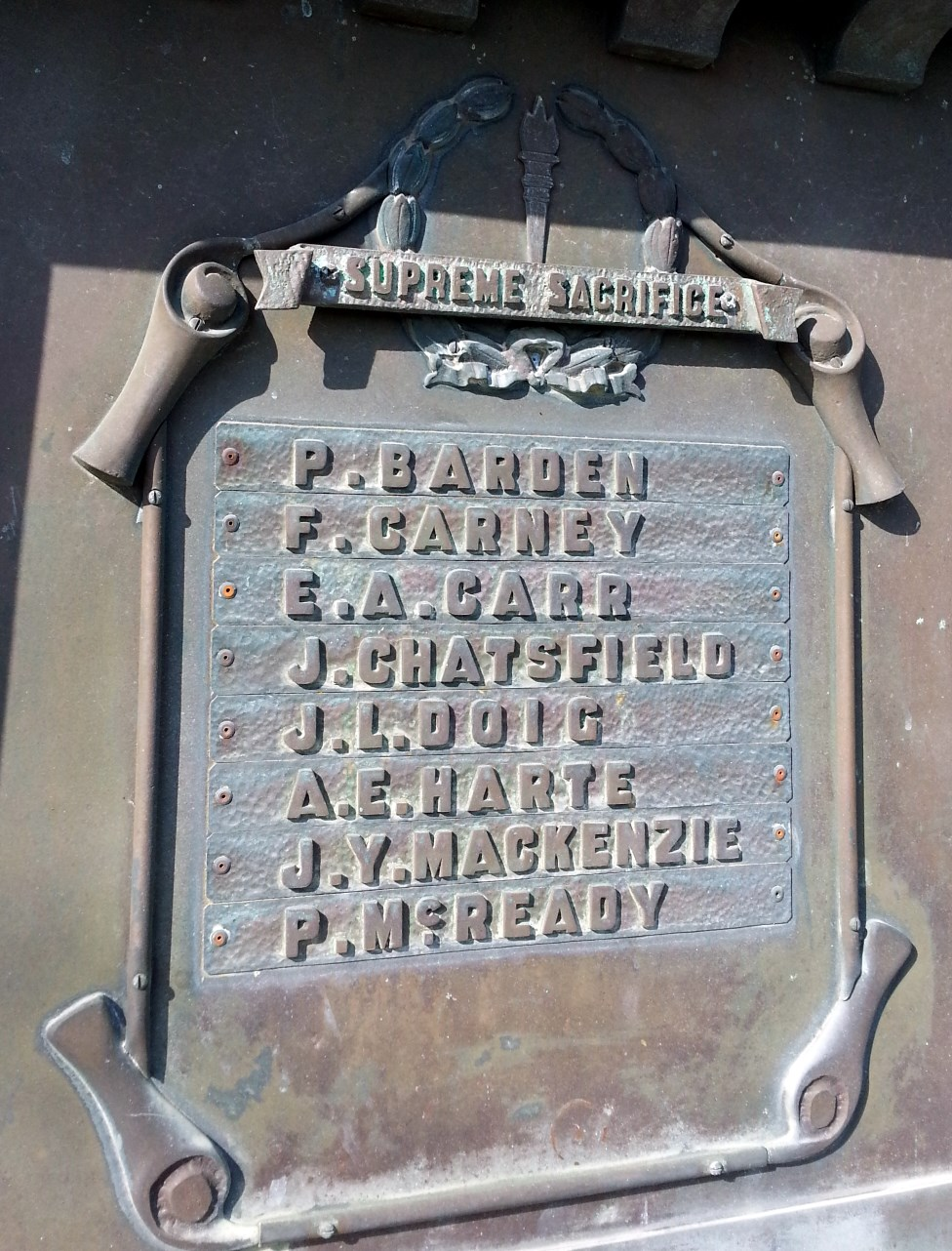
South Panel with the names of the fallen

The sides of the pedestal bear the memorial inscription and the names of the enlisted and fallen. The panel to the north bears the inscription in relief lettering; the south panel contains the names of the fallen, each an individual name plate within a decorative honour scroll; the east and west panels contain the individual name plates for the enlisted.

A landscaped area incorporating trees, garden bed and park furniture is situated near the fence of the neighbouring property to the north of the monument area. A seat, picnic table, tap and large, green metal utility box in this area are not of cultural heritage significance.

== Heritage listing ==
Pinkenba War Memorial was listed on the Queensland Heritage Register on 3 October 2005 having satisfied the following criteria.

The place is important in demonstrating the evolution or pattern of Queensland's history.

The Pinkenba War Memorial is important in demonstrating part of the pattern of Queensland's history, being associated with the national outpouring of grief at the deaths of about 60,000 Australians during WWI. During an era of strong and widespread Australian patriotism and nationalism most Queensland communities erected a public memorial to honour local participation in the war. Each monument is a unique historical documentary record.

The place is important in demonstrating the principal characteristics of a particular class of cultural places.

The memorial is important in exemplifying many of the elements common to WWI memorials in a form that is unusual for its type. Designed as a tangible place of memory to act as a focus for public mourning in the absence of graves, the memorial displays the names of the enlisted and the dead, it is designed to endure and it is set in an area large enough to accommodate ceremonial occasions. However, the memorial demonstrates a form that is unusual for WWI memorials in that it is composed of an unusual combination of classical and non-traditional elements.

The place is important because of its aesthetic significance.

Together with its setting, the memorial makes a significant aesthetic contribution to the townscape of Pinkenba. It is visually striking and it is located prominently in a verdant setting.

The place has a strong or special association with a particular community or cultural group for social, cultural or spiritual reasons.

The memorial is of social and spiritual significance for the local community, having a strong and continuing association with the community as evidence of the impact of a major historical event and as the focus for annual remembrance of that event in local Anzac Day commemorative ceremonies.

The place has a special association with the life or work of a particular person, group or organisation of importance in Queensland's history.

It is also significant as an example of the work of Ernest Gunderson, the well-known Queensland manufacturer and supplier of honour boards and memorials.
