= Meeandah railway station =

Former railway station in Brisbane, Queensland, Australia

Meeandah
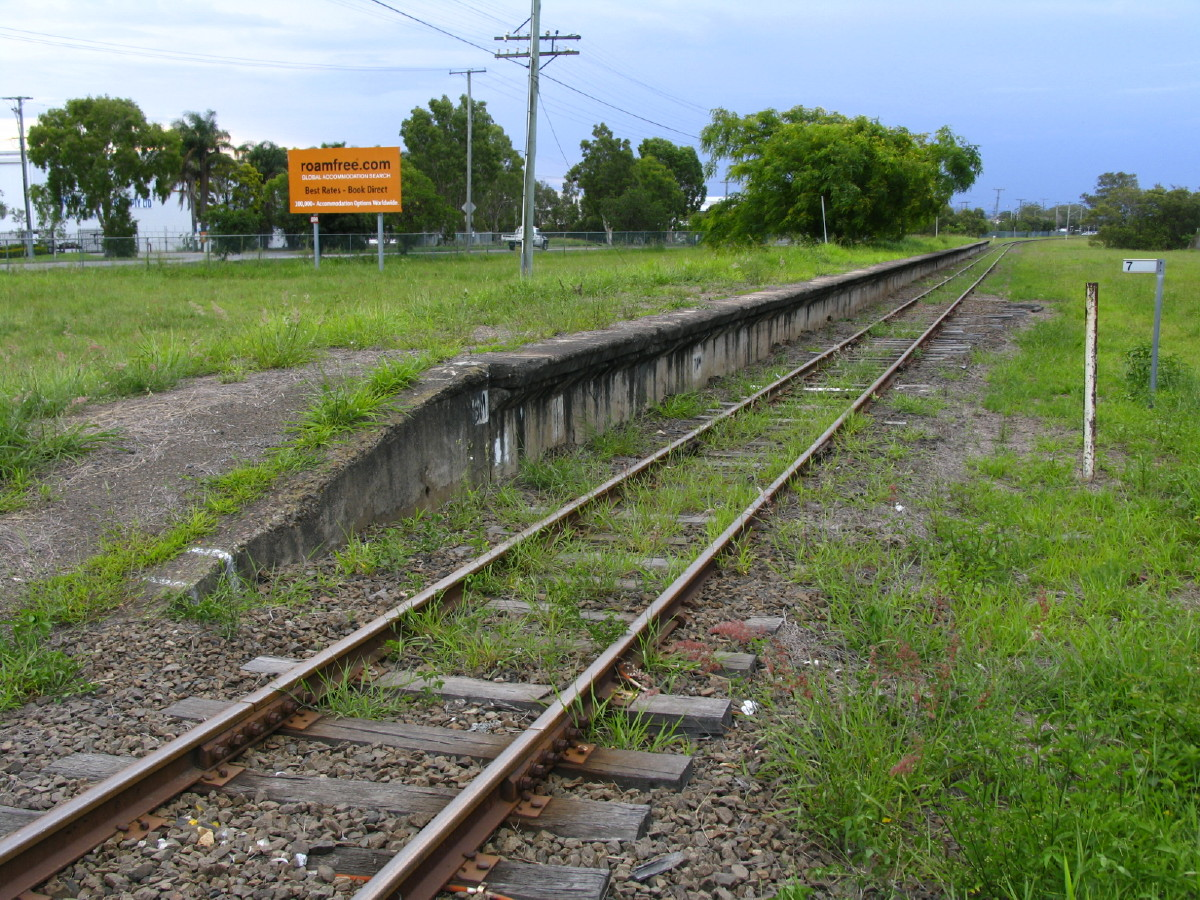
- Meeandah station in 2007

General information
- Location: Kingsford Smith Drive, Pinkenba
- Coordinates: 27.4297°S 153.1083°E
- Owner: Queensland Rail
- Line: Pinkenba line
- Platforms: 1 side platform
- Connections: Bus

Other information
- Fare zone: 2

History
- Opened: 1914
- Closed: 27 September 1993

Services
Preceding station	Queensland Rail	Following station
Bunour towards Roma Street	Pinkenba line	Pinkenba Terminus
Location

Meeandah railway station is an abandoned station on the Pinkenba railway line in the suburb of Pinkenba, City of Brisbane, Queensland, Australia. It is 8.7 kilometres (5.4 mi) from the Brisbane central business district and 13.4 kilometres (8.3 mi) from Central station by rail. It closed as a staffed station in 1930, reopened as an unattended gate in 1931, and was finally closed on 27 September 1993.

The name Meeandah comes from the English word "meander", after the twisting and turning route of the nearby Brisbane River.

== History ==
The line to Pinkenba opened on 1 April 1897. During World War I (1914–1918) and World War II (1939–1945), troop camps were located in the area because of deep berthing available to ships at Pinkenba on the mouth of the Brisbane River. Passenger ships of the Orient Steam Navigation Company—later P&O—used the Pinkenba wharf, and special trains ran from Brisbane.

The station mistress was withdrawn and the station closed in 1930, as an economic measure brought on by the Great Depression. Following protests to Railways Commissioner Davidson by local residents and workers, the station was reopened in 1931 as an unattended gate.

The HMS Nabreekie Mobile Naval Air Base and a large army camp defence storage and warehouse facility were located near Meeandah railway station during World War II; the army camp remains today as the Damascus Barracks.

In 1988, part of the Pinkenba line was electrified, but only as far as Eagle Farm station. Diesel-hauled passenger services, using stainless steel carriages, operated an infrequent passenger service to Pinkenba, including Meeandah. All passenger services on the line were suspended on 27 September 1993 by the Goss Labor government, as part of its rationalisation of the state rail network, involving the closure or suspension of services of unprofitable and underutilised rail lines.

== Current status ==
All that remains of Meeandah railway station today is its original low-level platform.

=== Replacement bus service ===
The bus stop for the replacement Translink bus service (303) is immediately beside the former Meeandah station, in Kingsford Smith Drive.

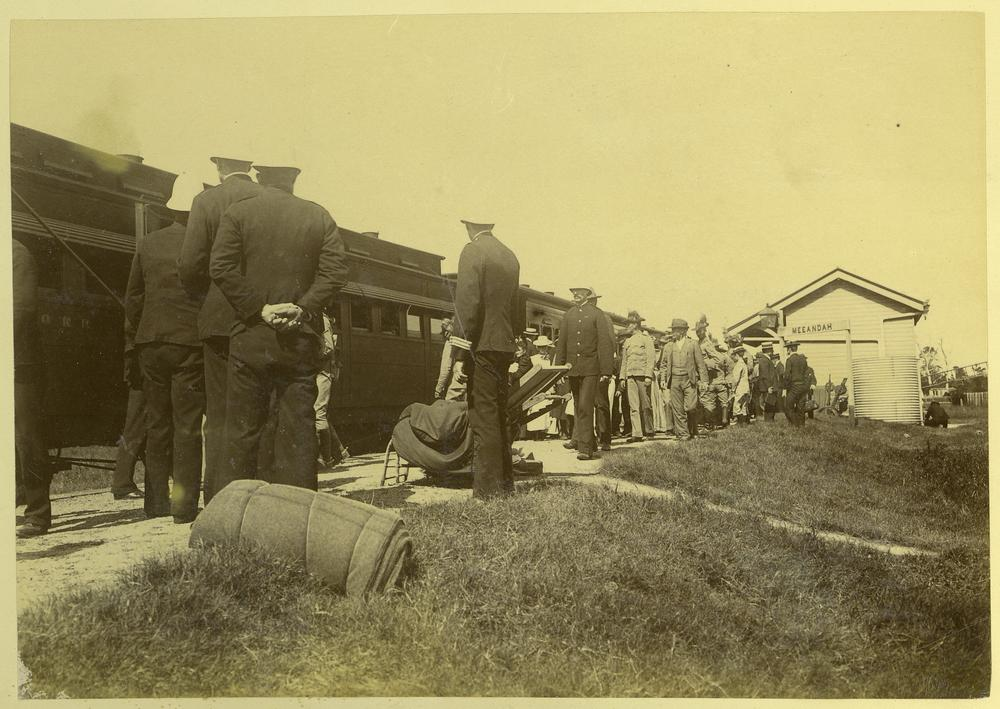
The station in 1899

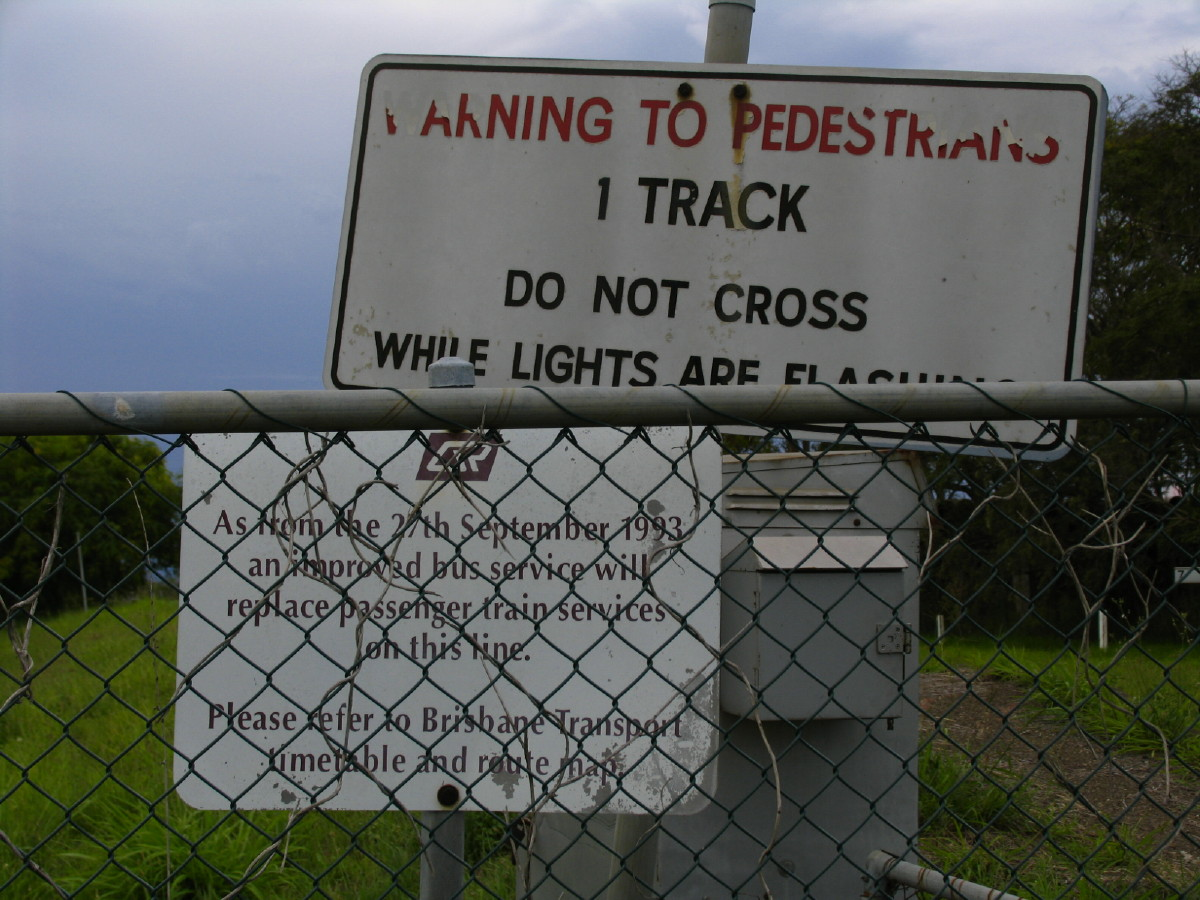
Sign advising that buses will replace trains

== See also ==
- Queensland Rail City network
- TransLink (Queensland)
