= Bulwer Island =

Island in Australia

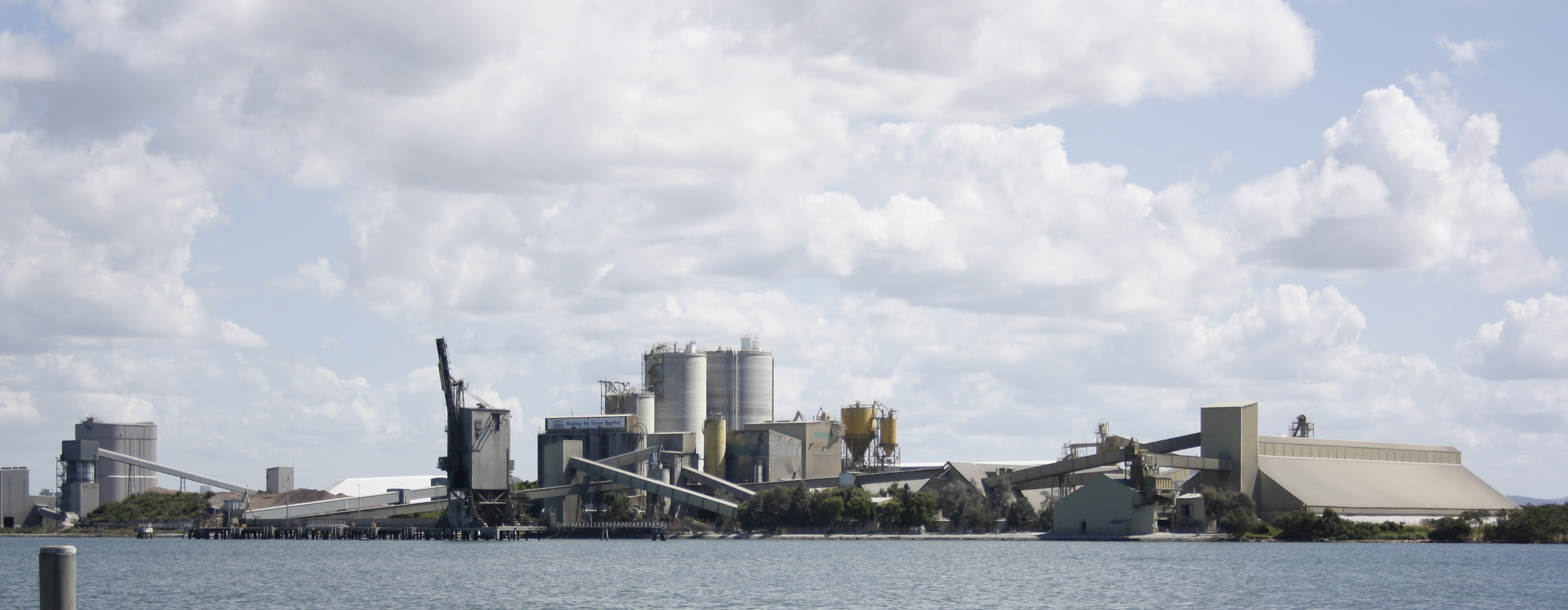
- Bulwer Island from Fort Lytton
- Interactive map of Bulwer Island

Geography
- Location: Northern Australia
- Coordinates: 27°24′30″S 153°08′25″E
- Area: 1.2 km^{2} (0.46 sq mi)

Administration
- Australia
- State: Queensland
- City: Pinkenba

Bulwer Island is a 120 hectares (1.2 km^{2}) reclaimed tidal mangrove island at the mouth of the Brisbane River in the suburb of Pinkenba, Brisbane, Queensland, Australia. It is named for Sir Edward Bulwer-Lytton, the British Colonial Secretary who separated Queensland from New South Wales in 1859 and made Sir George Bowen its first Governor.

== Air crash ==
In May 1961 a TAA DC-4 airliner crashed onto Bulwer Island during landing at Brisbane Airport. The pilot had suffered cardiac arrest and slumped over the control column preventing the co-pilot from regaining control before the plane dived into the mud of the island.

== Oil refinery ==
Land was reclaimed joining the island to the mainland commencing in 1963. An oil refinery commenced operations in 1965, and was converted to an import terminal in 2015.

== Lighthouse ==
A lighthouse, known as Bulwer Island Light, stood on the island between 1912 and 1983, as part of a pair of leading light. In 1983 it was replaced by a skeletal tower and relocated to the Queensland Maritime Museum in Brisbane.

== See also ==
- List of islands of Australia
- List of oil refineries
