= Pinkenba =

- Suburb
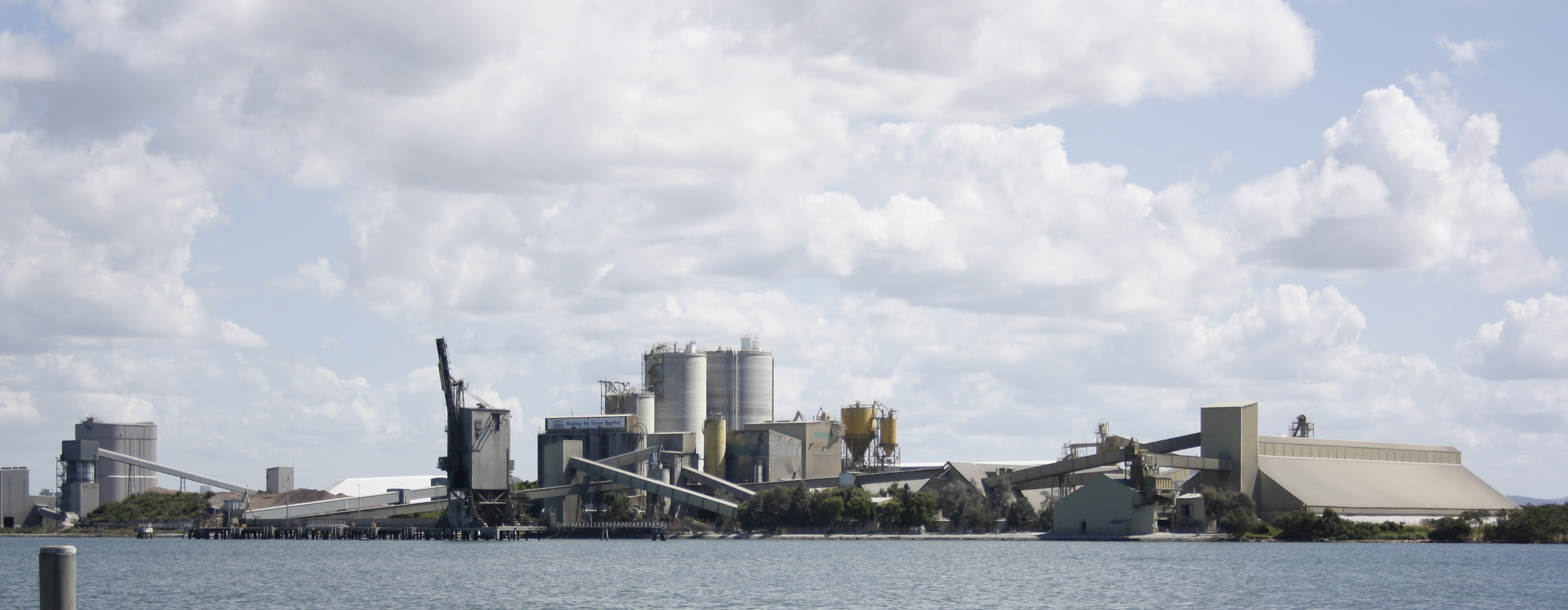
- Bulwer Island, 2010

- Interactive map of Pinkenba
- Coordinates: 27.4058°S 153.1408°E
- Country: Australia
- State: Queensland
- City: Brisbane
- LGA: City of Brisbane (Hamilton Ward)
- Location: 10.4 km (6.5 mi) ENE of Brisbane CBD

Government
  - State electorate: Clayfield
  - Federal division: Lilley

Area
  - Total: 18.2 km^{2} (7.0 sq mi)
- Elevation: 5 m (16 ft)

Population
  - Total: 350 (2021 census)
  - Density: 19.2/km^{2} (49.8/sq mi)
- Time zone: UTC+10:00 (AEST)
- Postcode: 4008
- Mean max temp: 25.5 °C (77.9 °F)
- Mean min temp: 15.8 °C (60.4 °F)
- Annual rainfall: 1,033.0 mm (40.67 in)
Suburbs around Pinkenba
Brisbane Airport	Moreton Bay	Port of Brisbane
Brisbane Airport	Pinkenba	Lytton
Eagle Farm	Murarrie	Hemmant

Pinkenba (/ˌpɪŋkənˈbɑː/ PING-kən-BAH) is a town and eastern coastal suburb within the City of Brisbane, Queensland, Australia. In the 2021 census, Pinkenba had a population of 350 people.

== Geography ==
Pinkenba is a long narrow strip of land on the northern side of the Brisbane River, facing Moreton Bay, 10 kilometres (6.2 mi) from the Brisbane central business district. The area is spatially isolated from other residential suburbs and is bounded by the Brisbane Airport to west, Moreton Bay to the north, and the Brisbane River to the east.

The neighbourhood of Myrtletown is at the northern end of the suburb of Pinkenba (27.3919°S 153.1336°E).

The neighbourhood of Bulwer Island is in the centre of the suburb (27.4097°S 153.1363°E).

The former suburb of Meeandah, now a neighbourhood, is located (27.4297°S 153.1069°E) at the southern end of the suburb of Pinkenba.

Pinkenba has the following headlands:

- Juno Point on Moreton Bay (27.3635°S 153.1550°E)
- Luggage Point (also known as Uniacke Point) at the mouth of the Brisbane River (27.3780°S 153.1596°E)

The land use is mostly industrial except for a small residential area at the town centre.

=== Climate ===
Pinkenba has a warm humid subtropical climate (Köppen: Cfa) with hot, wet summers and very mild, drier winters. The wettest recorded day was 26 January 1974 with 307.4 mm (12.10 in) of rainfall. The suburb experiences 133.4 clear days and 98.9 cloudy days. Extreme temperatures ranged from 40.2 °C (104.4 °F) on 22 February 2004 to −0.1 °C (31.8 °F) on 19 July 2007.

Climate data was sourced from Brisbane Airport to the west.

Climate data for Pinkenba (Brisbane Airport) (27.39°S 153.13°E) (5 m (16 ft) AMSL) (1994-2025)
Month	Jan	Feb	Mar	Apr	May	Jun	Jul	Aug	Sep	Oct	Nov	Dec	Year
Record high °C (°F)	38.1 (100.6)	40.2 (104.4)	34.9 (94.8)	32.3 (90.1)	30.6 (87.1)	27.9 (82.2)	29.5 (85.1)	33.7 (92.7)	34.9 (94.8)	39.1 (102.4)	37.9 (100.2)	36.5 (97.7)	40.2 (104.4)
Mean daily maximum °C (°F)	29.1 (84.4)	29.1 (84.4)	28.0 (82.4)	26.1 (79.0)	23.6 (74.5)	21.3 (70.3)	21.0 (69.8)	22.1 (71.8)	24.2 (75.6)	25.6 (78.1)	27.0 (80.6)	28.3 (82.9)	25.5 (77.8)
Mean daily minimum °C (°F)	21.4 (70.5)	21.2 (70.2)	19.9 (67.8)	16.6 (61.9)	13.2 (55.8)	10.7 (51.3)	9.4 (48.9)	10.0 (50.0)	13.0 (55.4)	16.0 (60.8)	18.4 (65.1)	20.3 (68.5)	15.8 (60.5)
Record low °C (°F)	15.8 (60.4)	14.6 (58.3)	10.6 (51.1)	5.6 (42.1)	3.0 (37.4)	2.5 (36.5)	−0.1 (31.8)	1.9 (35.4)	3.7 (38.7)	7.2 (45.0)	8.3 (46.9)	13.4 (56.1)	−0.1 (31.8)
Average precipitation mm (inches)	127.8 (5.03)	155.1 (6.11)	130.6 (5.14)	74.4 (2.93)	96.6 (3.80)	60.4 (2.38)	32.6 (1.28)	34.7 (1.37)	31.0 (1.22)	80.6 (3.17)	97.9 (3.85)	121.2 (4.77)	1,033 (40.67)
Average precipitation days (≥ 0.2 mm)	12.8	12.6	13.8	10.7	9.8	8.4	7.0	5.7	5.9	9.1	10.8	11.4	118
Average afternoon relative humidity (%)	63	63	61	58	56	55	50	50	55	58	61	62	58
Average dew point °C (°F)	19.5 (67.1)	19.6 (67.3)	18.0 (64.4)	15.4 (59.7)	12.2 (54.0)	9.9 (49.8)	8.1 (46.6)	8.6 (47.5)	11.7 (53.1)	14.3 (57.7)	16.3 (61.3)	18.3 (64.9)	14.3 (57.8)
Mean monthly sunshine hours	263.5	228.8	229.4	237.0	229.4	204.0	238.7	269.7	267.0	272.8	276.0	269.7	2,986
Percentage possible sunshine	62	63	60	69	69	65	73	78	75	69	68	63	68
Source: Bureau of Meteorology (1994-2025)

== History ==
Pinkenba is situated in the traditional country of the Turrubal Aboriginal people, who spoke a language within the Jagera language group. The name Pinkenba was adopted from the local Turrubal placename binkinba, which means "place of plentiful, or good hunting place for, land tortoise", but, like Toowong, was used for a different location. However, unlike Toowong, that was not in error: the Turrubal binkenba/Pinkenba had been named New Farm 65 years earlier.

The name of the former suburb of Meeandah is often thought to be of Aboriginal origin, but it took its name from the now disused Meeandah railway station on the Pinkenba railway line, which was a corruption of the Greek word meander, and referred to Serpentine Creek which flowed through the area, but was converted into a drain following the development of Brisbane Airport.

Bulwer Island was named after Lord Edward Bulwer-Lytton who, as the British Secretary of State for the Colonies, separated Queensland from New South Wales in 1859. As the name suggests, it was originally an island in the Brisbane River which became permanently attached to the mainland through a land reclamation project in the 1960s.

Boggy Creek State School opened on 22 February 1875. It was renamed Myrtle State School in 1888. In 1900, it was renamed Pinkenba State School. With student numbers falling to 6 students, the school was mothballed on 31 December 2008 and closed on 31 December 2010. It was located at 248 Eagle Farm Road, on the corner of Serpentine Road (27.4202°S 153.1218°E). The school's website was archived.

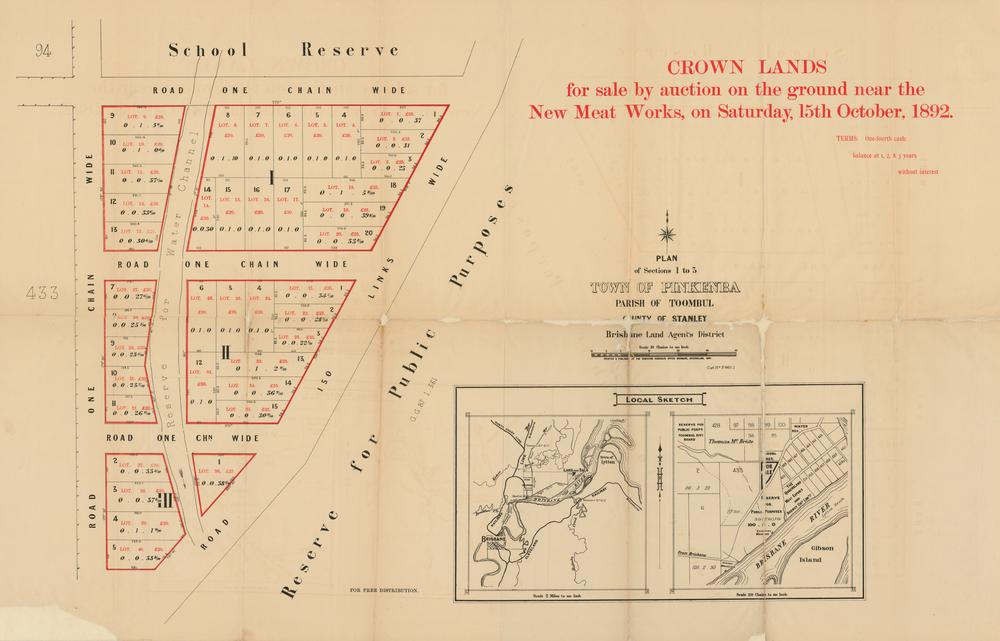
Estate map of the Town of Pinkenba, Brisbane, Queensland, 1892

In 1892, the opening of the Queensland Meat Export and Agency Company's meatworks in Pinkenba necessitated the establishment of a town where workers could live close to their work. On 15 October 1892, there was an auction of 40 allotments of land in the new town of Pinkenba. That land was bounded by the present-day streets of McBride Road to the west, Serpentine Road to the north, and Eagle Farm Road to the south-east (27.4219°S 153.1197°E).

A postal receiving office was opened in 1892, becoming Pinkenba Post Office in 1897. In 1969, it was on the north-eastern corner of Hopper Street and McBride Street (27.4224°S 153.1190°E).

On Saturday 15 December 1900, auctioneers Isles, Love & Co offered 42 suburban allotments and seven farm sites for sale in the Cluya Road area (27.4142°S 153.1254°E).

In 1902, a Baptist church opened in Pinkenba. Prior to the opening of the church, the Baptist congregation met in Harris's Hall. A stump-capping ceremony for the new church was held on Monday 11 November 1901. The church officially opened on New Year's Day, 1 January 1902.

In 1902, a spur line was built from Pinkenba to the wharf, to facilitate the movement of goods. In 1909, a separate railway wharf was constructed.

Pinkenba Wharf was the point of embarkation for many World War I soldiers. The Pinkenba & District War Memorial commemorates those from the district who served and died in the war. The memorial was unveiled on 16 August 1919 by the Queensland Governor, Sir Hamilton Goold-Adams.

Pinkenba Presbyterian Church opened in 1915. In 1969, it was on the north-eastern corner of McBride Street and Esker Street (27.4213°S 153.1193°E). It was demolished circa 1980.

Pinkenba Rail Post Office opened at the Pinkenba railway station in mid 1915 and closed in April 1954.

Brisbane's first sewerage treatment plant was officially opened at Luggage Point on 23 November 1923. It was Australia's first full-scale sewerage treatment plant, a key component of Brisbane's sewerage scheme which commended in March 1914. It was serviced by an electric tramway.

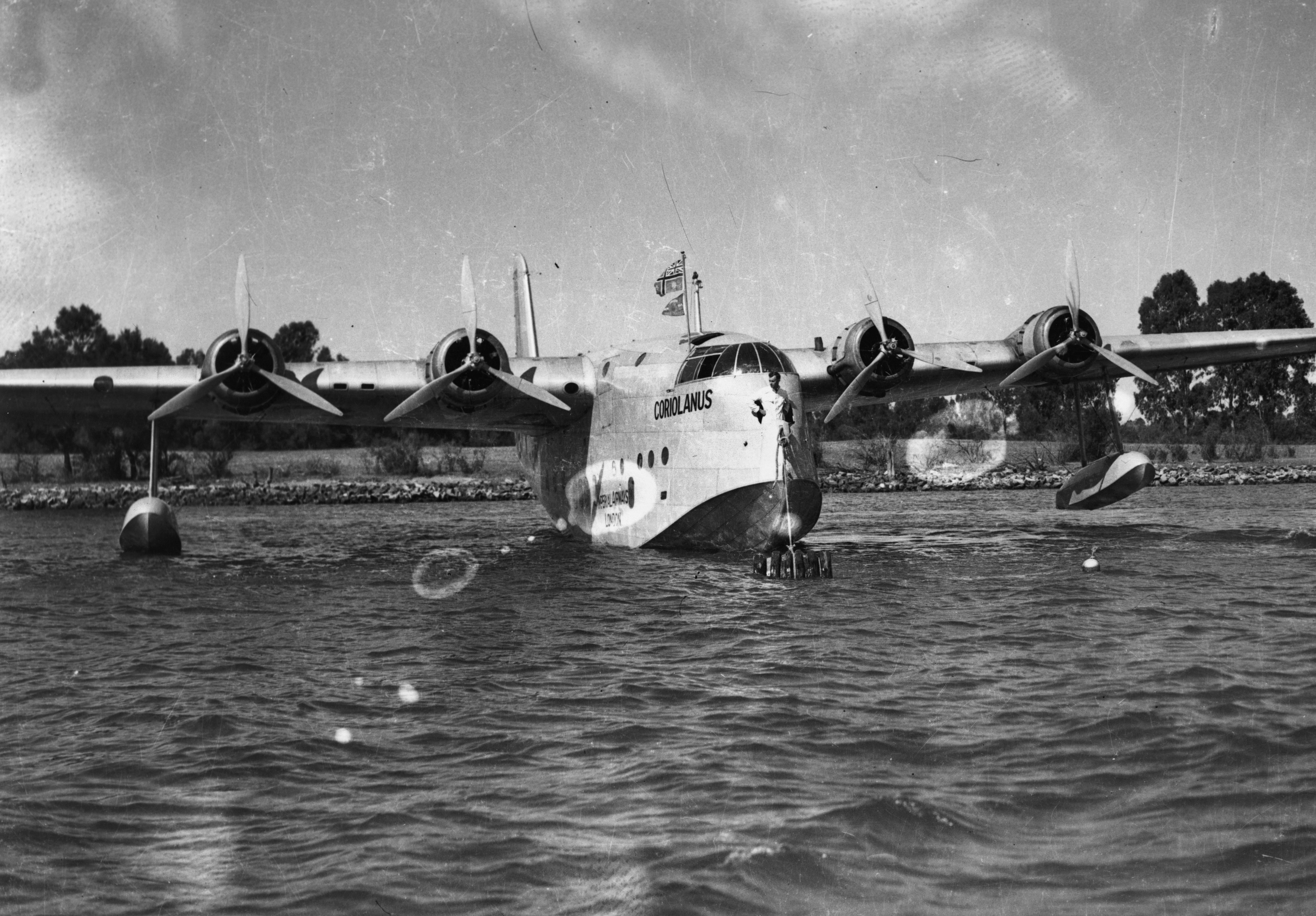
Seaplane S.23, Coriolanus, moored at Pinkenba in 1939

Myrtletown State School opened in 1924 and closed on 19 February 1971. It occupied the northern part of the block bounded by Main Beach Road, School Road (now Lewandowski Drive) and Sandmere Street (27.3893°S 153.1412°E).

St Matthias' Anglican Church was dedicated on 14 February 1925 by Canon de Witt Batty. It closed circa 1981. It was located on the south-east corner of Hopper Street and McBride Road (27.4227°S 153.1189°E).

Myrtletown Methodist Church opened circa 1930. In 1969, it was on the western side of Myrtletown Road (now Main Myrtletown Road) between Rowlingson Street (no longer extant) and Priors Road (approx 27.4055°S 153.1255°E). The church is no longer extant; its land is now part of the Brisbane Airport, just south of Qantas Hangar 3's carpark.

Qantas selected Pinkenba for its flying boat base in the 1930s. Until World War II, the other flying boat base, at Hamilton Reach, was too congested, but the Qantas base eventually moved upstream, providing better access for passengers.

During the war, a Royal Australian Navy Defence Station was established, with the remains of the facility listed on the current Queensland Heritage Register.

On 6 March 1963, Queen Elizabeth II unveiled a roadside memorial at 315 Tingara Street (corner of Kirra Street, 27.41690°S 153.13579°E). It commemorates the discovery of commercial quantities of oil in Australia at Moonie. The location was chosen because it was close to the site of the oil refinery which was to be built to process the oil. However, at the time of the queen's visit, The Canberra Times described the site as "desolate" and "a smelly, muddy, mosquito-infested swamp", but the site was planted with 12-foot (3.7 m) high palm trees and flower beds and the area sprayed with insecticide in advance of her visit (which are no longer extant). The memorial was designed sculptor Rod Shaw of Narrabeen, Sydney. The bas relief monement reflects the cooperation between the United States and Australia in the search for oil though the imagery of oil workers handling a drill bit with flags of the two countries in the background. Although significant oil deposits had been found at Moonie, the 186-mile (299 km) pipeline to Brisbane was not completed until the following year.

Bulwer Island Oil Refinery commenced with a major land reclamation project on Bulwer Island in the Brisbane River, which was then a tidal mangrove swamp. Over 2,000,000 cubic metres (71,000,000 cu ft) of material was dredged from the bed of Brisbane River to connect the island with the northern bank of the river and to create a 90-hectare (220-acre) site (27.4021°S 153.1416°E) raised to 2 metres (6 ft 7 in) above the high tide level. During its operation, it was the largest oil refinery in Queensland. It was decommissioned in 2015 and now operates as an import terminal.

In 1975, Myrtletown (then an independent suburb) was downgraded to a neighbourhood within Pinkenba. Myrtletown was historically known as a residential and farming locality, though maritime and industrial facilities have developed in recent decades.

As of March 2020, two cruise ship wharves for Brisbane are located there, with differing facilities. Portside Wharf at Hamilton was completed in 2006 and is an international-standard facility for cruise liners, offering restaurants, coffee shops, gift shops, and other facilities. However, due to the height restrictions of the Gateway Bridge, and length restriction of 270 metres (890 ft) that far upstream, larger cruise liners must dock further down the river at the more industrial multi-user terminal at the Port of Brisbane. In late 2020, the new Brisbane International Cruise Terminal was scheduled to open on the northern bank of the Brisbane River at Myrtletown, opposite the port (27.3811°S 153.1542°E), but its opening was delayed because of shut-down of the cruise industry due to the COVID-19 pandemic. The new cruise terminal is located at Luggage Point next to the Luggage Point sewage treatment plant (which has been renamed the Luggage Point Resource Recovery Centre). The new terminal will be able to accommodate the largest cruise vessels in the world. It will be operated by the port but will not be part of the suburb of Port of Brisbane (which is on the southern bank of the river).

During the COVID-19 pandemic, the Centre for National Resilience Brisbane (a quarantine facility) was constructed in Pinkenba on land owned by the Department of Defence at the site of the Damascus Barracks. The facility opened on 25 August 2022, but was never used to isolate COVID-19 patients. In April 2024, the facility was handed over to the Australian Federal Police, who intend to convert it to a police training facility, having never been used as a quarantine facility.

== Demographics ==
In the 2011 census, Pinkenba recorded a population of 350 people; 42.9% female and 57.1% male. The median age of the Pinkenba population was 42 years, 5 years above the Australian median. Children aged under 15 years made up 15.4% of the population and people aged 65 years and over made up 12.8% of the population. 62.5% of people living in Pinkenba were born in Australia, compared to the national average of 69.8%; the next most common countries of birth were New Zealand 7%, Iran 6.8%, England 2.5%, Italy 1.4%, France 0.8%. 77.3% of people spoke only English at home; the next most popular languages were 2% Italian, 1.7% Cantonese, 1.1% Tagalog, 0.9% Afrikaans, 0.9% Serbo-Croatian/Yugoslavian. The most common religious affiliation was "No Religion" 22.8%; the next most common responses were Catholic 19.9%, Anglican 16.5%, Presbyterian and Reformed 5.4% and Uniting Church 4.3%.

In the 2016 census, Pinkenba had a population of 368 people.

In the 2021 census, Pinkenba had a population of 350 people.

== Heritage listings ==
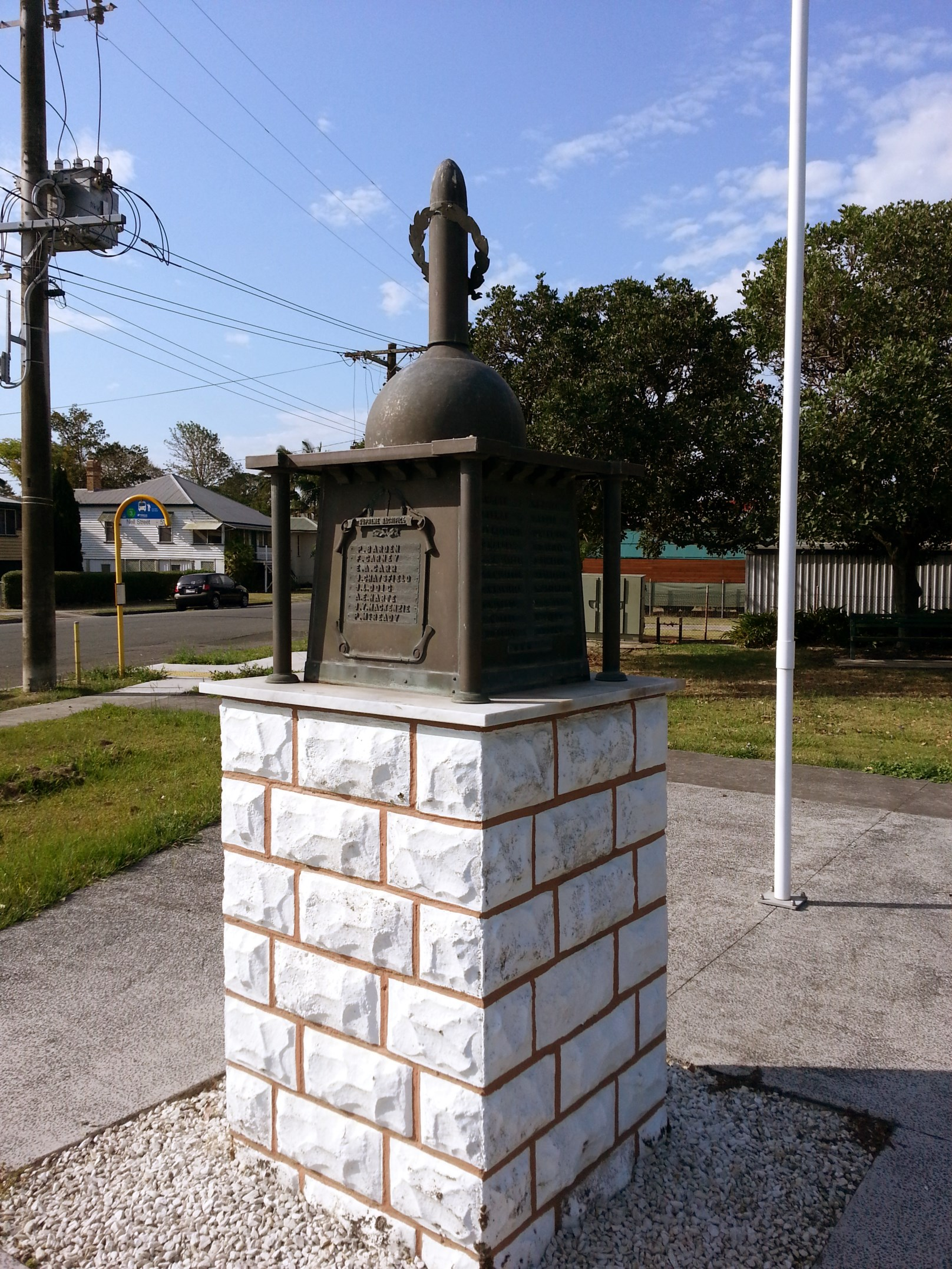
Pinkenba War Memorial, 2013

Pinkenba has a number of heritage-listed sites, including:

- Pinkenba State School, 238 Eagle Farm Road
- Luggage Point Stores Buildings, 200 Main Beach Road (approx 27.3806°S 153.1459°E)
- Pinkenba War Memorial, opposite 16 Mcbride Street (27.4236°S 153.1188°E)
- Former RAN Station 9 (also known as Myrtletown Boom Defence and Indicator Loop Control Centre), 51 Sandmere Road (Myrtletown Reserve, 27.3913°S 153.1418°E)
- Former Pinkenba Police Station, 14 Serpentine Road (27.4209°S 153.1210°E)
- Amoco Time Capsule, 323 Tingira Street (27.41629°S 153.13599°E)

== Economy ==
Pinkenba is the site of BP's Bulwer Island Refinery (an import terminal since 2015), and Shell's Pinkenba Terminal. In 2011, Shell's operations at Bulwer Island were expanded, with the opening of a new bitumen and marine fuel import facility. Shell facilities include its Queensland state office, a bitumen plant, a lubricants and grease manufacturing facility, several warehouses and a fuel storage unit.

== Education ==
There are no schools in Pinkenba. The nearest government primary school is Hamilton State School in Hamilton to the south-west. The nearest government secondary school is Aviation High in Hendra to the west.

== Facilities ==
Pinkenba Post Office is at 46-48 McBride Road (27.4219°S 153.1188°E).

Luggage Point Wastewater Treatment Plant is a sewage treatment plant (27.3797°S 153.1505°E).

Bulwer Island Power Station generates electricity from gas (27.4048°S 153.1349°E).

Numerous development projects have been proposed for the area, including residential developments and an immigration detention centre.

== Attractions ==
Pinkenba has a historical trail, which was designed on behalf of the Pinkenba Community Association and the Port of Brisbane with help from Brisbane City Council Neighbourhood planning team.

== Transport ==
The suburb is accessed by road via Kingsford Smith Drive, which passes an industrial area before reaching the suburb. A railway branch line to Pinkenba was constructed to encourage port development downstream away from the Brisbane central business district. The now-abandoned Pinkenba railway station opened in 1882 as the terminus of the line, and closed in 1993.

On the day of the 2011 census, 9.1% of employed people travelled to work on public transport and 63.6% by car (either as driver or as passenger).

== See also ==
- List of Brisbane suburbs
