= Myrtletown, Queensland =

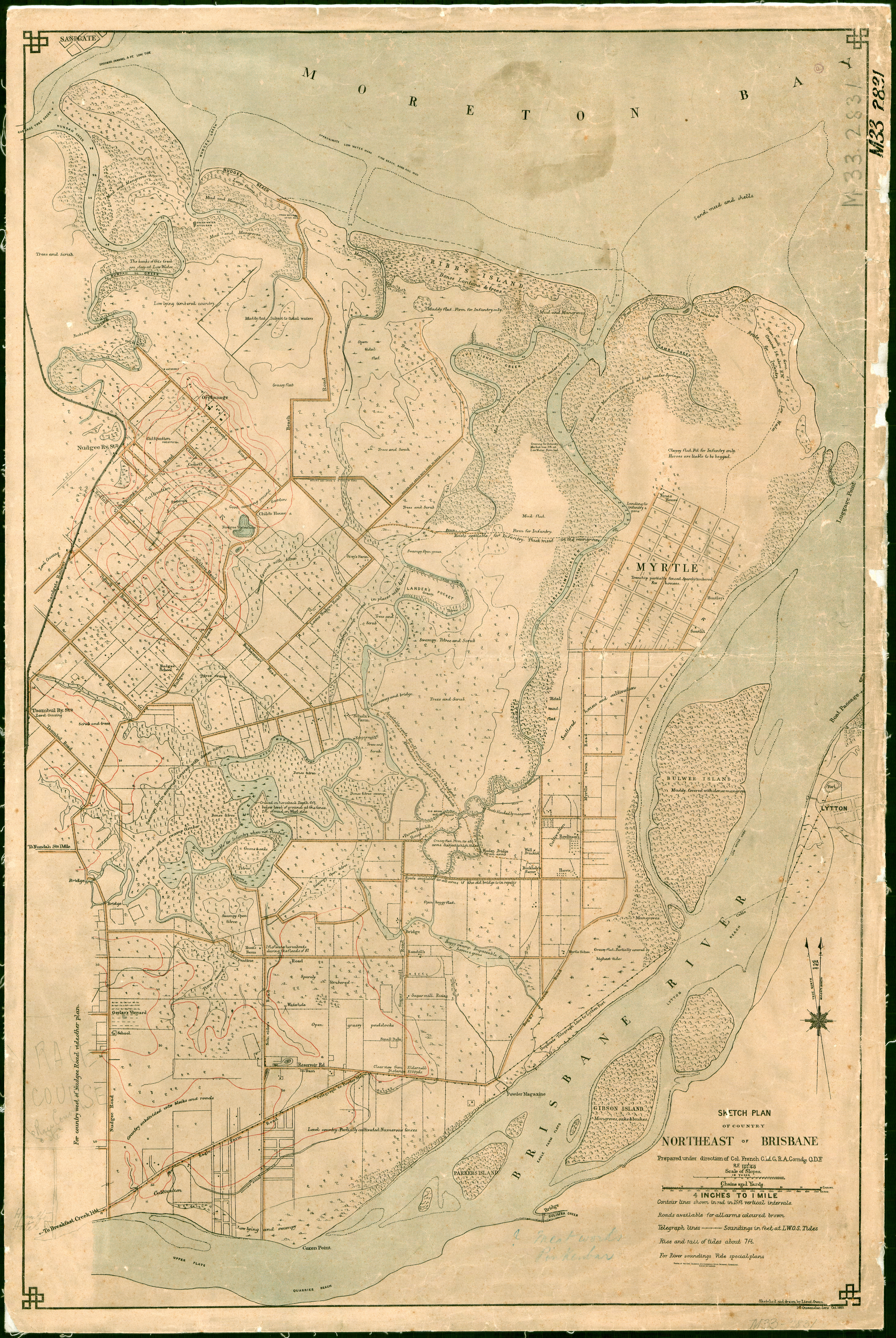
Map showing Myrtle (later Myrtletown), 1889

Myrtletown is a former town and now industrial neighbourhood within the suburb of Pinkenba, City of Brisbane, Queensland, Australia.

== Geography ==
In the north of Pinkenba, it is situated near the northern bank of the mouth of the Brisbane River. The north-easternmost point of Myrtletown at the mouth of the Brisbane River is Luggage Point (also called Uniacke Point) at (27.3781°S 153.1597°E).

Boggy Creek enters the Brisbane River at 27.3956°S 153.1403°E.

== History ==
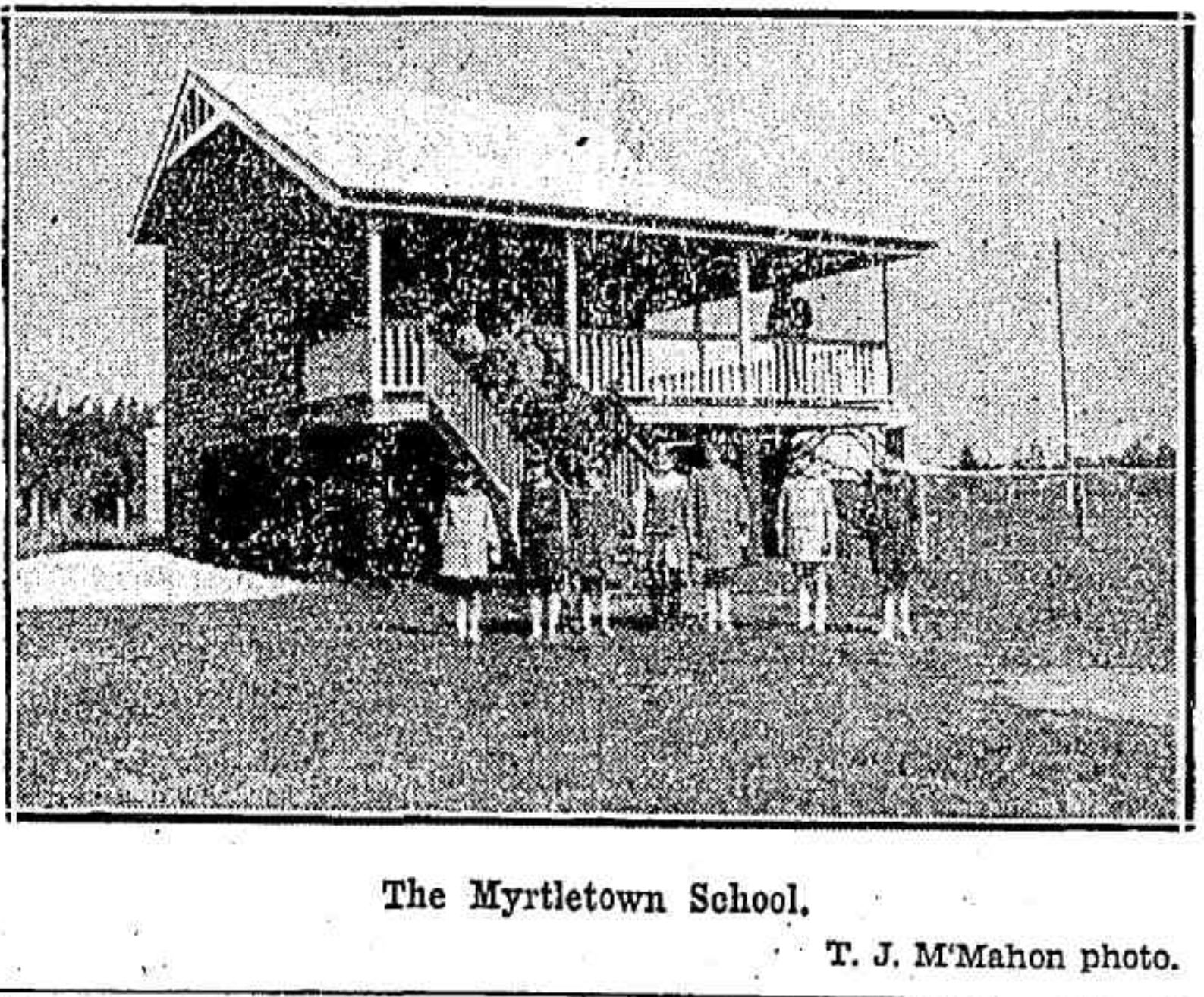
Myrtletown State School, 1928

The area was originally known as Boggy Creek after the creek of the same name. The name Myrtletown derives from a prominent grove of myrtle trees, which had disappeared by 1928.

=== Luggage Point ===
Luggage Point was named Uniacke Point by John Oxley during his exploration of the Brisbane River in the HM Colonial Cutter Mermaid in December 1823. The point was named after John Fitzgerald Uniacke (1798–1825) who was a naturalist and ornithologist on the expedition. However, by 1839, it was known both as Luggage Point and Uniacke Point. The name Luggage Point derives from the practice of off-loading luggage at the point to enable ships to cross the bar at the mouth of the Brisbane River (no longer present due to dredging). The luggage would be transferred up river separately.

Luggage Point Wastewater Treatment Plant (which has been renamed the Luggage Point Resource Recovery Centre) is the site for the main sewerage outfall for Brisbane.

=== Land use and development ===
Initially used only for fishing and gathering oysters, John Chapman established a farm in the area circa 1881. By 1928 it had developed within a town centre surrounded by about 200 acres (81 ha) of farmland, with approximately 250 people living in the area. The layout of the town can be seen in an 1889 map. Many of the residents were descended from the early settler families of Chapman, Allnutt, Wenzel and Naumann. The farming consisted of orchards, banana plantations, vineyards (growing Black Hamburg grapes) and market gardens (growing tomatoes, beans, cabbages and cauliflowers). Prawns and fish were obtained from Boggy Creek.

Residents began lobbying for a local school in 1922. Myrtletown State School opened in 1924 and closed on 19 February 1971. It occupied the northern part of the block bounded by Main Beach Road, School Road (now Lewandowski Drive) and Sandmere Street (27.3893°S 153.1412°E).

As at 1928, the town had a Methodist church but no post office. There were 3 or 4 omnibus services to Brisbane each day.

=== Luggage Point sewerage works ===
Brisbane's first sewerage treatment plant was officially opened at Luggage Point on 23 November 1923. It was Australia's first full-scale sewerage treatment plant, a key component of Brisbane's sewerage scheme which commended in March 1914. It was serviced by an electric tramway.

=== Airport construction ===
Formerly a semi-rural residential area, the construction of the Brisbane Airport at nearby Cribb Island caused most residents to leave. The area has become increasingly industrial ever since.

=== Cruise ship terminal ===
The cruise ship terminal at Portside Wharf at Hamilton was completed in 2006; however, due to the height restrictions of the Gateway Bridge and length restriction of 270 metres (890 ft) that far upstream, the new Brisbane International Cruise Terminal was opened in June 2022, causing the Portside Wharf terminal to close. The new terminal is able to accommodate the largest cruise vessels in the world and is located at 27.3811°S 153.1542°E on the northern bank of the Brisbane River in Pinkenba, opposite the Port of Brisbane and next to the Luggage Point Wastewater Treatment Plant (which has been renamed the Luggage Point Resource Recovery Centre). It is operated by the Port of Brisbane but is not part of the suburb of Port of Brisbane.
