= Pinkenba railway station =

Former railway station in Brisbane, Queensland, Australia

Pinkenba
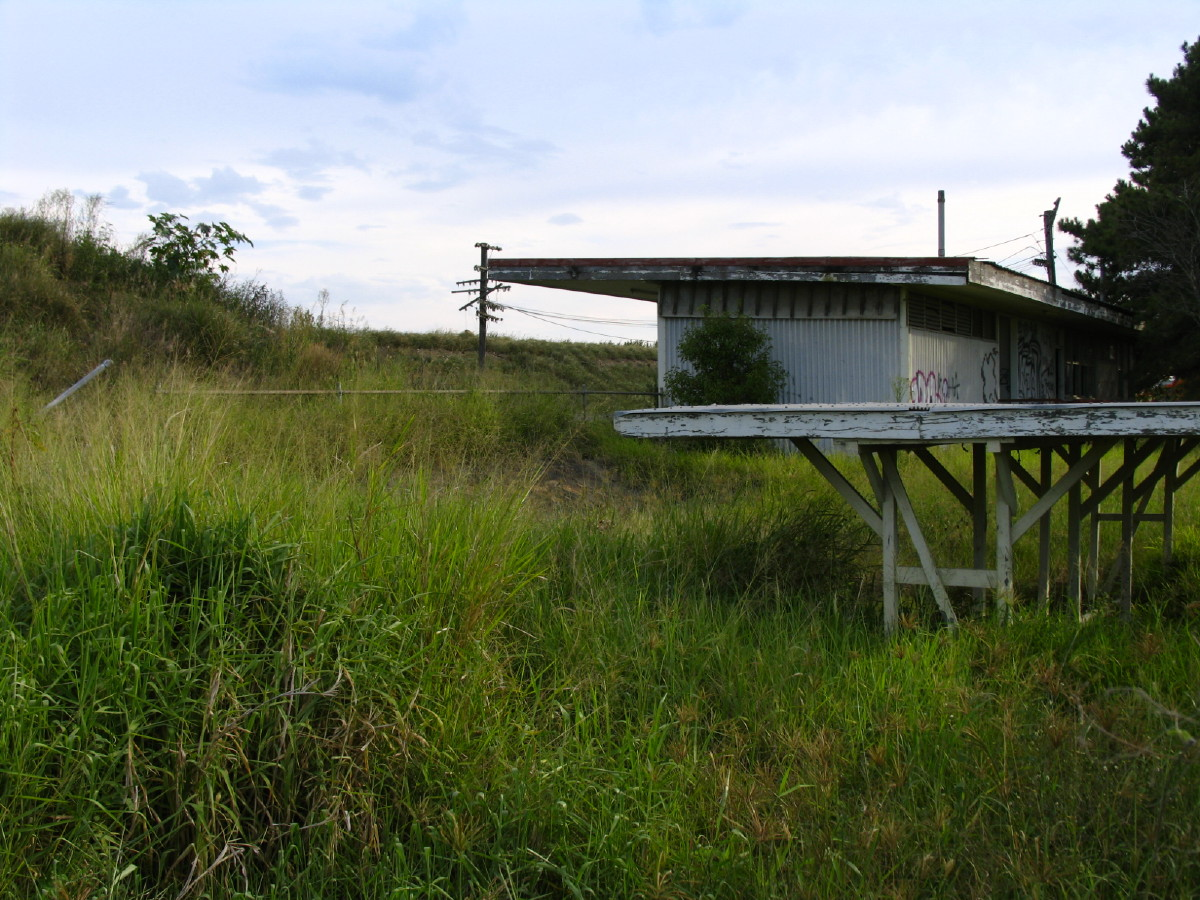
- Abandoned Pinkenba station building, 2007

General information
- Location: Eagle Farm Road, Pinkenba
- Coordinates: 27.4268°S 153.1163°E
- Owner: Queensland Rail
- Line: Pinkenba line
- Platforms: 1 side platform
- Connections: Bus

Other information
- Fare zone: 2

History
- Opened: 1 April 1897
- Closed: 27 September 1993
- Rebuilt: 1969

Services
| Preceding station | Queensland Rail | Following station |
|---|---|---|
| Meeandah towards Roma Street | Pinkenba line | Terminus |
Location

Pinkenba railway station was a railway station on the Pinkenba railway line in the suburb of Pinkenba, City of Brisbane, Queensland, Australia. It was originally the terminus station of the Pinkenba Line, just 9 kilometres (5.6 mi) from the Brisbane central business district and 14.1 kilometres (8.8 mi) from Central station by rail. It opened in 1897 and was rebuilt in 1969, with a new station closer to the township of Pinkenba. The first station became a shunters' quarters. The line closed to all passenger traffic in 1993.

== History ==
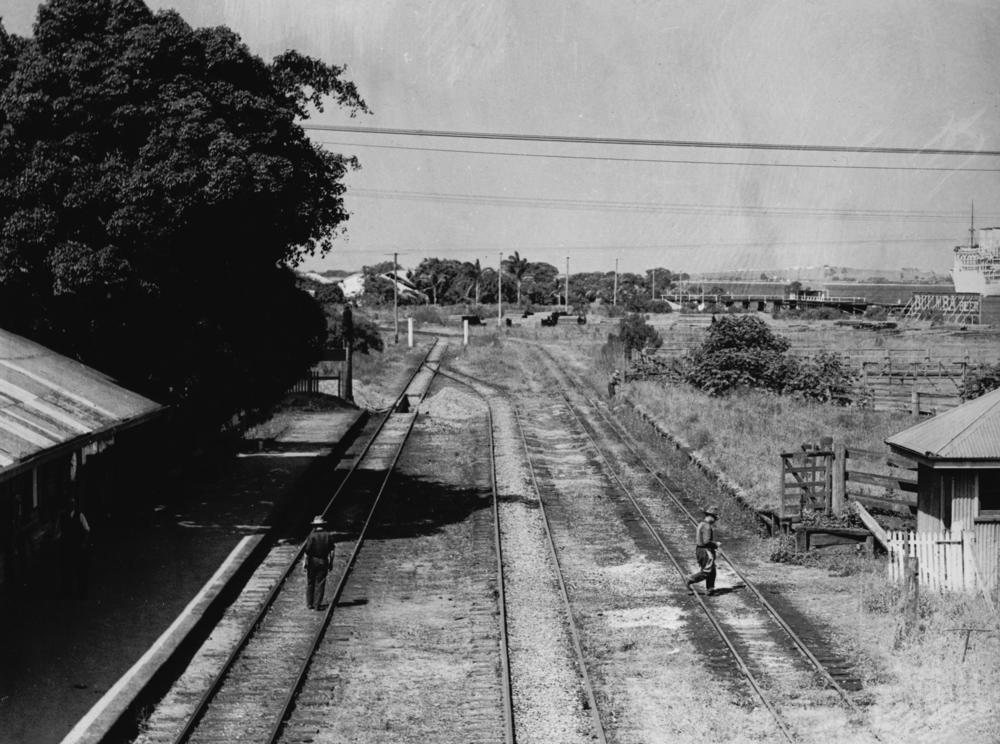
Pinkenba station, c.1935

The Pinkenba line opened 1 April 1897. During World War I (1914 to 1918) and World War II (1939 to 1945), troop camps were located at Pinkenba and Meeandah because of deep berthing available to ships at Pinkenba, at the mouth of the Brisbane River. Passenger ships of the Orient Steam Navigation Company, later P&O, used the adjacent Pinkenba Wharf, and special trains ran from Brisbane to Pinkenba.

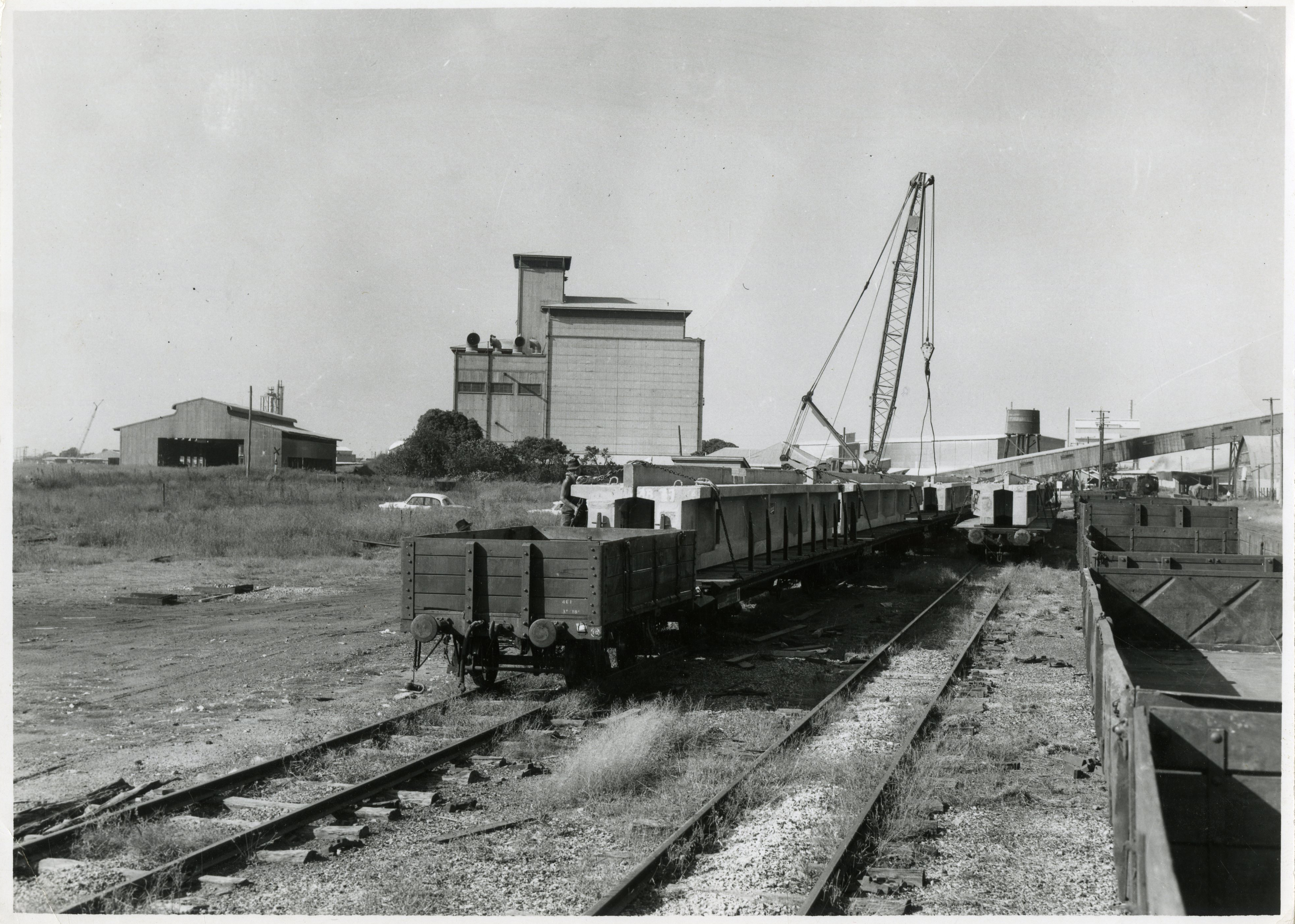
Pinkenba rail yard, 1970

On 29 August 1906, a contract was let for refreshment rooms to be constructed at Pinkenba station, at a cost of £318. They operated until the new Pinkenba station opened in 1969.

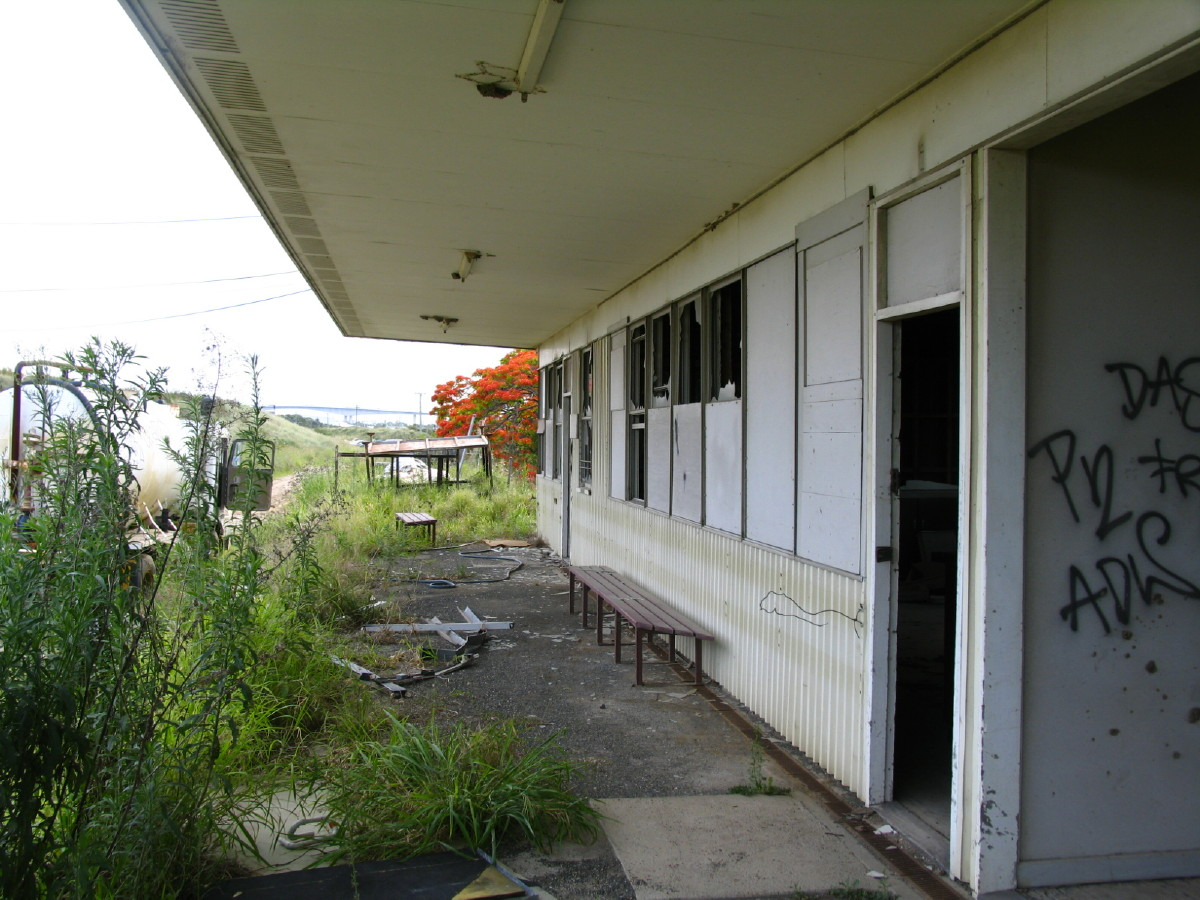
Pinkenba station, 2007

In 1988, part of the line was electrified, but only as far as Eagle Farm station. Diesel-hauled trains operated infrequent passenger services to Pinkenba. On 27 September 1993, all passenger services on the line were suspended by the Goss Labor government, as part of a state-wide rationalisation of the rail network, which involved under-utilised or unprofitable rail lines being closed or having services suspended.

== Current status ==
In 2005, the 1969 Pinkenba station area became a rubbish recycling site, with large amounts of dirt dumped over the terminus siding. The 1969 station building remained until 2016, although badly damaged and used as a dumping ground, and the track that connected the station to the Pinkenba line was removed. By 2017, the building had been demolished. Queensland Rail still owns the land.

The original 1897 station building was removed to a GrainCorp site. Circa 2001, the station building was cut in half and removed, pending the redevelopment of the site. The right-hand section went to a private home in Shore Street East, Cleveland, and the left-hand section was transferred by ferry to North Stradbroke Island, where it serves as the ticket office for Stradbroke Ferries.

=== Replacement bus service ===
The bus stop for the replacement Translink bus service (303) is in Eagle Farm Road, immediately adjacent to the site of the former station.

== See also ==
- Queensland Rail City network
- TransLink (Queensland)
