= Eagle Farm railway station =

Former railway station in Brisbane, Queensland, Australia

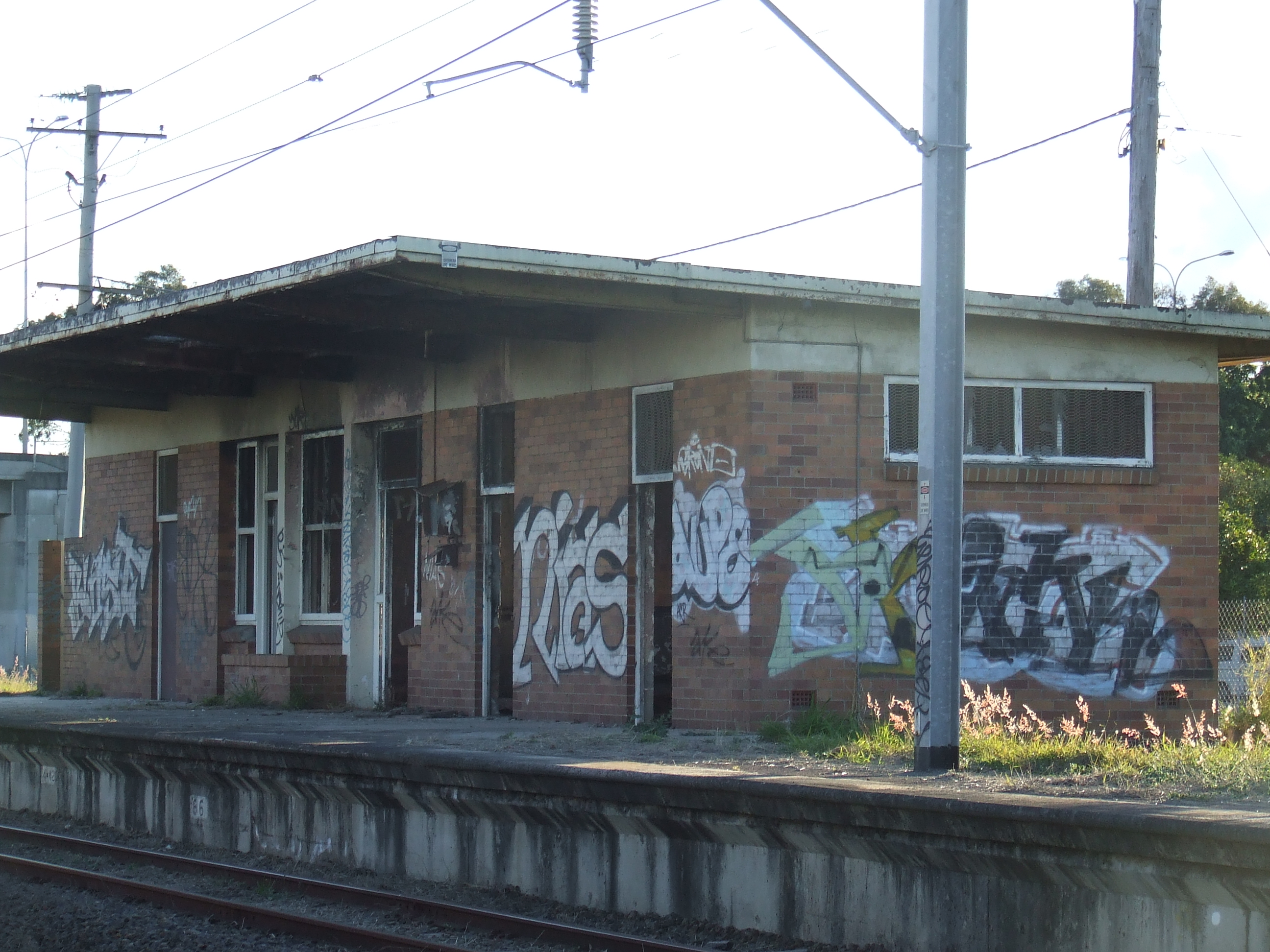
- Eagle Farm station building, 2007

General information
- Location: Between Acacia Street and Lamington Avenue, Eagle Farm
- Coordinates: 27.4303°S 153.0828°E
- Owner: Queensland Rail
- Line: Pinkenba line
- Platforms: 1 side platform
- Connections: Bus

Other information
- Fare zone: 2

History
- Closed: 27 September 1993

Services
Preceding station	Queensland Rail	Following station
Doomben towards Roma Street	Pinkenba line	Bunour towards Pinkenba
Location

The Eagle Farm railway station is an abandoned passenger station in Brisbane, Queensland, Australia. It is on the Pinkenba railway line, only 6.8 kilometres (4.2 mi) from the Brisbane central business district and 10.9 kilometres (6.8 mi) from Central station.

== History ==
Opened in 1952 as Baraini railway station, it was renamed a few months later to Airport railway station because it was located near the former Brisbane Airport at Eagle Farm before the airport moved to its current location, north, at the demolished suburb Cribb Island.

Airport station was unpopular with airport passengers, mainly due to its very infrequent services and the significant walking distance to the airport terminal. The station was renamed Eagle Farm in 1988, along with the electrification of the line to a point only until a few metres past the station.

On 27 September 1993, all passenger services on the line were suspended by the Goss Labor state government, under its policy to rationalise the rail network throughout Queensland, which involved the suspension or closing of unprofitable and under-utilised rail lines.

In 1998, the line was re-opened to passenger services, but only as far as Doomben, the station immediately prior to Eagle Farm. Connecting bus services ran to the closed railway stations between Doomben and Pinkenba.

== Original Eagle Farm station ==
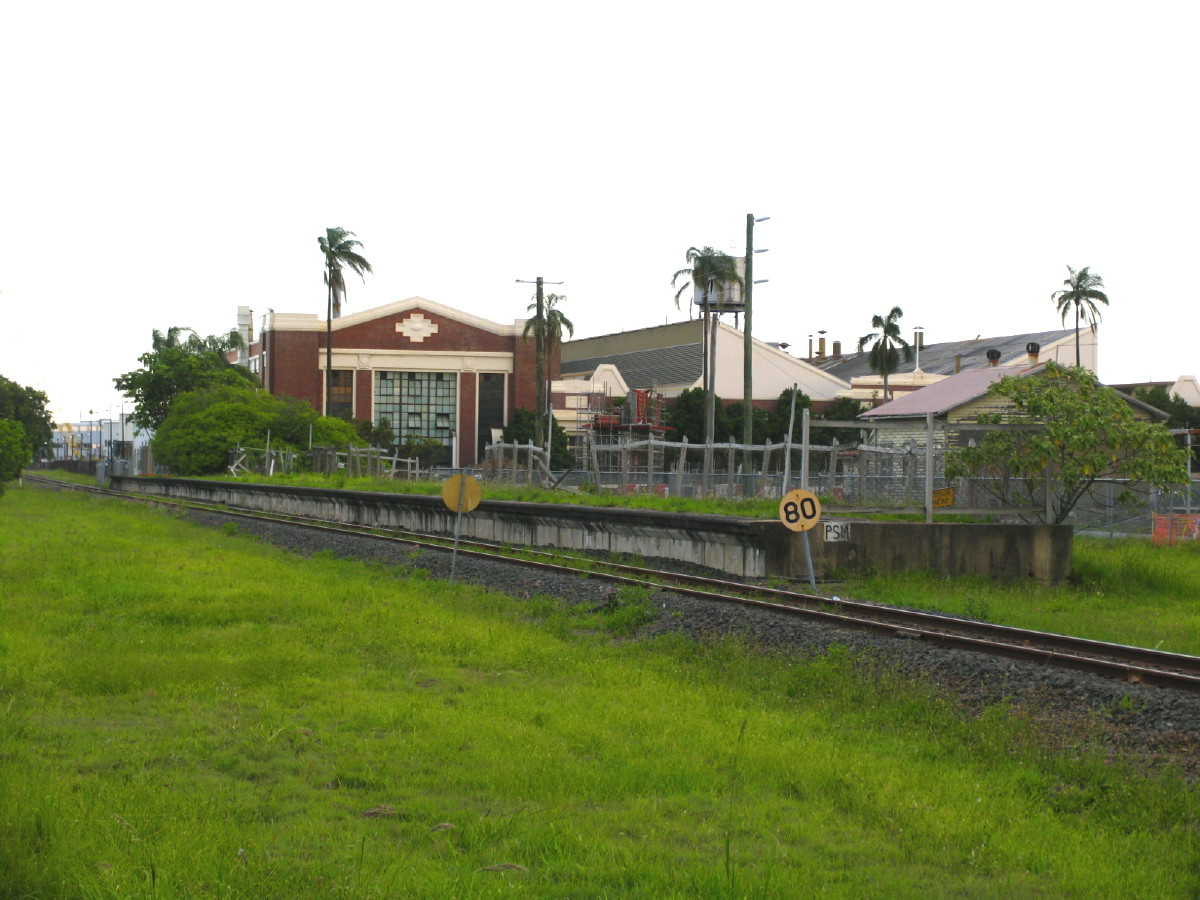
Original Eagle Farm station, 2007

The original Eagle Farm railway station was opened in 1897, and was just 90 metres past Airport. It was west of the corner of Want Street and Schneider Road, behind the Ford Motor Company of Australia works, today home of G. James glass. The station was closed in 1977, following the opening of Whinstanes-Doomben station.

== See also ==
- Queensland Rail City network
- TransLink (Queensland)
