= Eagle Farm, Queensland =

Eagle Farm
- Suburb
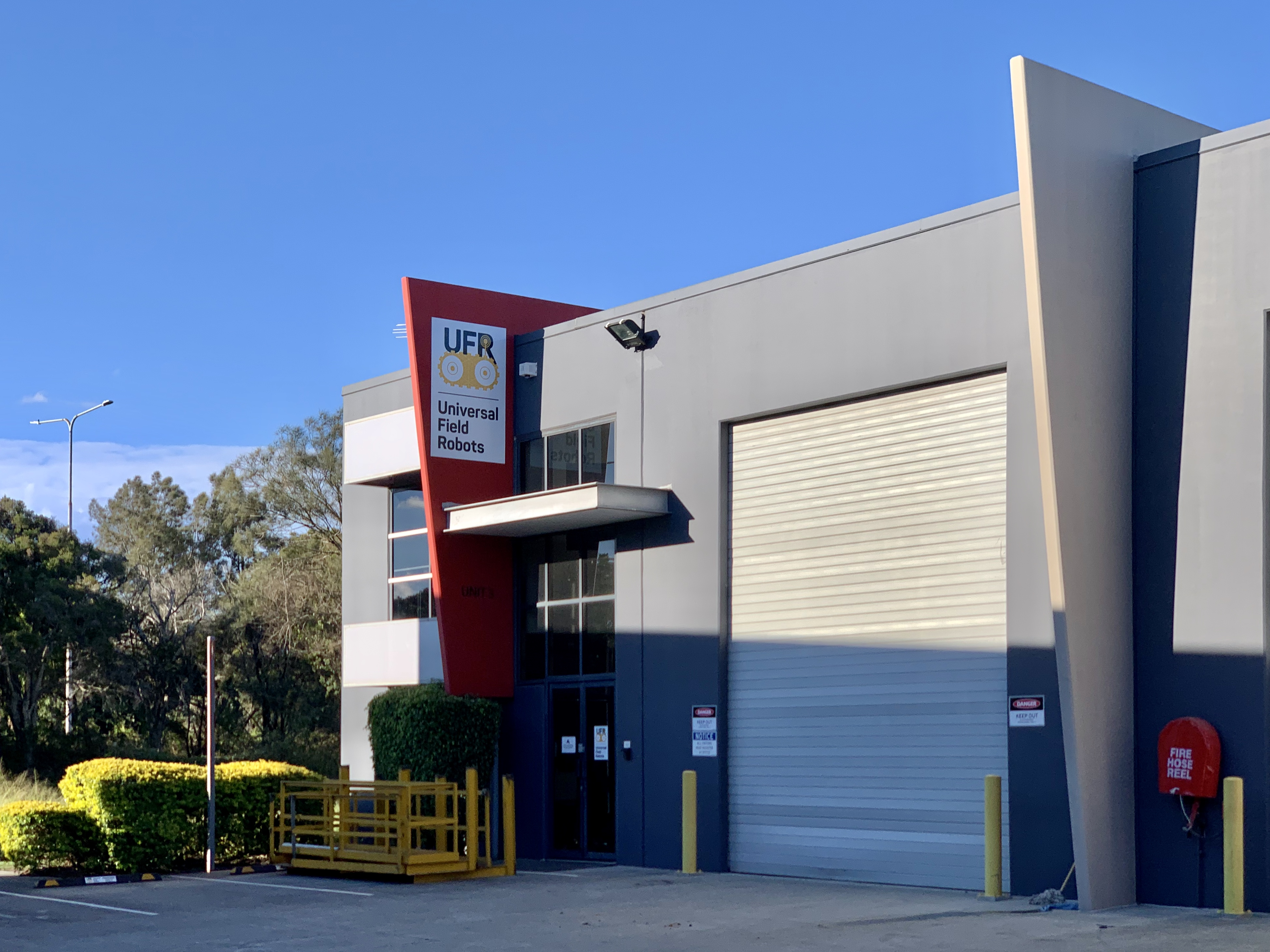
- Industrial premises, Eagle Farm

- Interactive map of Eagle Farm
- Coordinates: 27.4313°S 153.0880°E
- Country: Australia
- State: Queensland
- City: Brisbane
- LGA: City of Brisbane (Hamilton Ward)
- Location: 8.9 km (5.5 mi) NE of Brisbane CBD

Government
  - State electorate: Clayfield
  - Federal divisions: Brisbane; Lilley

Area
  - Total: 5.9 km^{2} (2.3 sq mi)

Population
  - Total: 11 (2021 census)
  - Density: 1.86/km^{2} (4.83/sq mi)
- Time zone: UTC+10:00 (AEST)
- Postcode: 4009
Suburbs around Eagle Farm
Hendra; Ascot	Brisbane Airport	Pinkenba
Hamilton	Eagle Farm	Pinkenba
Morningside	Murarrie	Murarrie

Eagle Farm is an eastern industrial suburb of the City of Brisbane, Queensland, Australia. The neighbourhood of Whinstanes is located in Eagle Farm (27.4333°S 153.0833°E). In the 2021 census, Eagle Farm had a population of 11 people.

== Geography ==
Eagle Farm is situated 8.5 kilometres (5.3 mi) north-east of the Brisbane central business district. It is bounded to the south by the median of the Brisbane River. Eagle Farm is within the industrial-development zone known as Australia TradeCoast.

Kingsford Smith Drive passes through the suburb from west (Hamilton) to east (Pinkenba). The Gateway Motorway passes through the suburb from the south (Murarrie) crossing the Brisbane River via the Sir Leo Hielscher Bridges and then exits to the north (Brisbane Airport). The Southern Cross Way splits from the Gateway Motorway and also heads north-west, becoming the north-western boundary of Eagle Farm with Hamilton.

The Doomben/Pinkenba railway line passes through the suburbs from west (Ascot/Hamilton) to east (Pinkenba) to the north of Kingsford Smith Drive. There are no railway stations within the suburb any more.

The Royal Queensland Golf Club is located at 431 Curtin West Avenue and extends south to the river. Apart from the golf course, the suburb is industrial.

Despite the name, the Eagle Farm Racecourse, home of the Queensland Turf Club (QTC) and the main racecourse for thoroughbred gallopers in Brisbane, is located in neighbouring Ascot.

== History ==
Eagle Farm first appeared as a name in 1839, identifying a cultivation area in the Moreton Bay penal settlement. In 1829, Captain Patrick Logan chose this well-watered, fertile site between the Brisbane River and Serpentine Creek to farm mostly maize, pigs and cattle. The origin of the name apparently arose from eagles being observed around the farm. By 1834, women prisoners were working as field labour at Eagle Farm. By 1836, forty female prisoners were housed there, washing and mending clothes, growing vegetables. The site remained a prison for twice convicted female felons until transportation ended in 1839. Conditions for the females at the prison were documented by the Quaker missionary James Backhouse in 1836.

In the 1850s, Aboriginal people set up camps in the Breakfast Creek Eagle Farm area, including groups of the Bribie Island, Ningy-Ningy (Toorbul Point to Redcliffe) and Wide Bay Aboriginal peoples, who were losing their traditional territory further north.

Eagle Farm State School opened on 1 August 1864. In 1908, the school was renamed Hendra State School.

In October 1895, the Queensland Government approved the extension of the Racecourse railway which terminated at Racecourse railway station (now Ascot railway station) through Eagle Farm to Pinkenba to provide access to the Pinkenba Wharf on the Brisbane River. This created a number of new railway stations: Doomben, Whinstanes, Baraini (later renamed Airport to service Eagle Farm Airport, then later renamed Eagle Farm), Bunour, Meeandah and Pinkenba. The line opened to Meeandah on 31 March 1897, but the section to Pinkenba was below the high tide level and had to be reclaimed using sand dredged to construct a railway wharf on the river. The line opened to Pinkenba on 1 September 1897. In 1976, a new Whinstanes-Doomben railway station was created between the original two stations to replace them, and was renamed simply Doomben railway station in the 1990s. From 27 January 1998, the line terminated at this station and the following stations are now abandoned.

On 24 April 1920, auctioneer Thorpe and Sharp offered 87 "park like" suburban allotments in the Whinstanes Junction Estate to the north-east of the Whinstanes railway station (no longer extant). The estate was bounded by Lamington Avenue to the south and the Doomben Racecourse to the north with allotments facing two streets Birdwood Street and Monash Streets. As at 2019, this area is an industrial estate with Western Avenue passing through it with no sign of Birdwood and Monash Streets.

The Eagle Farm Airport served as Brisbane's main airport until the opening of the present Brisbane Airport in 1988. During WWII U.S. Navy Seabees of the 55th CB built Camp Seabee adjacent to Australian CCC Camp by the Airport as a staging centre for Construction Battalions assigned to MacArthur's 7th Amphibious force. It was the smallest of the military installations at Eagle Farm. They also built an adjoining Advance Base Construction Depot (ABCD) and the USN Ordnance depot at Mount Coot-tha. CBs that were there were the 19th, 55th, 60th, 77th, 84th, 91st, 104th and the CBMU 564. The base operated from March 1943 until mid October 1945. The Royal Australian Navy moved into Camp Seabee and the Australian Army took over the ABCD and Ordnance depot.

== Demographics ==
In the 2011 census, Eagle Farm had "no people or a very low population" .

In the 2016 census, Eagle Farm had "no people or a very low population".

In the 2021 census, Eagle Farm had a population of 11 people.

== Heritage listings ==
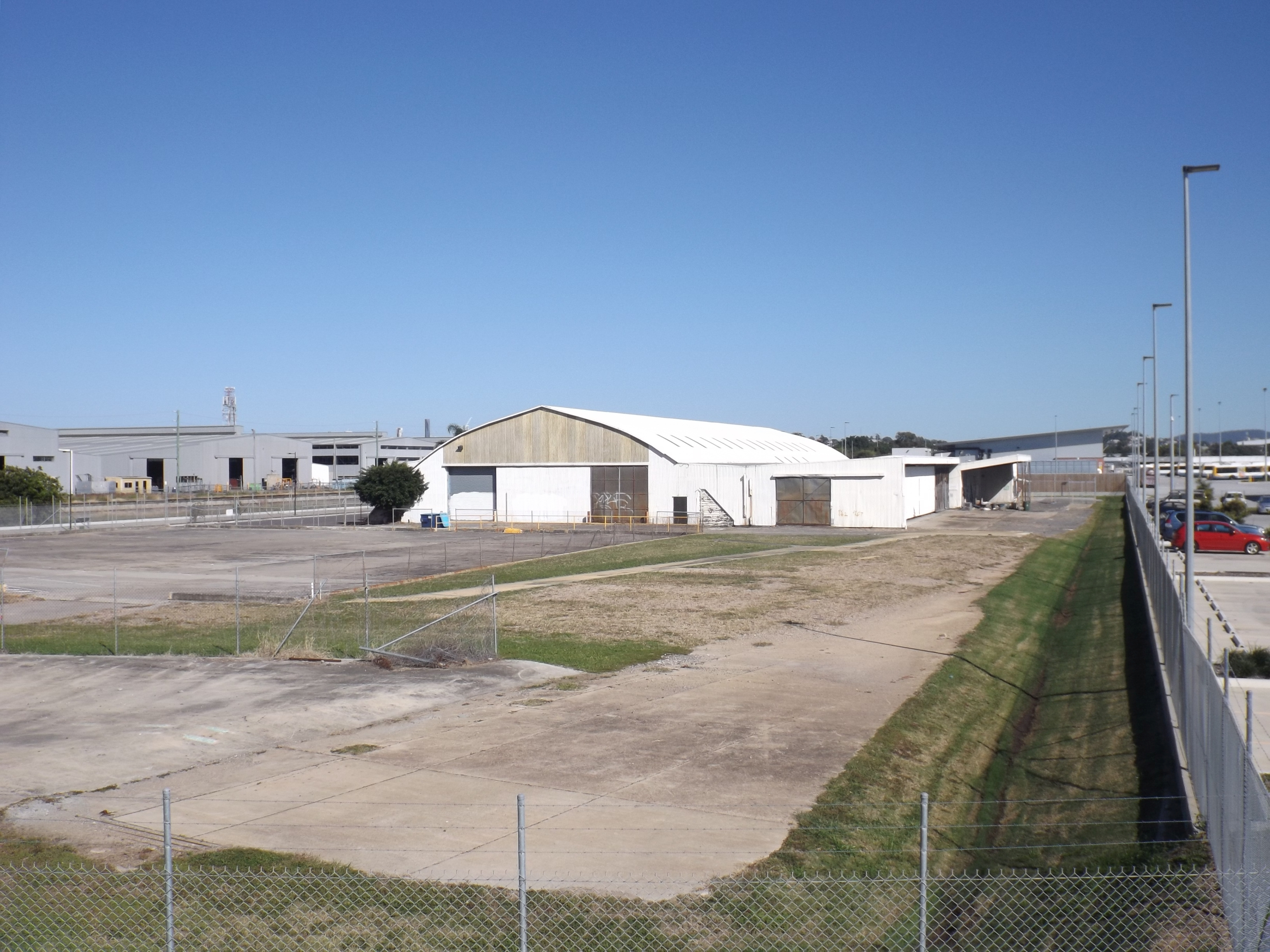
Second World War Hangar No. 7, 2015

Eagle Farm has a number of heritage-listed sites, including:

- Allison Engine Testing Stands
- Eagle Farm Women's Prison and Factory Site
- Second World War Hangar No. 7

== Allison Engine Testing Stands ==
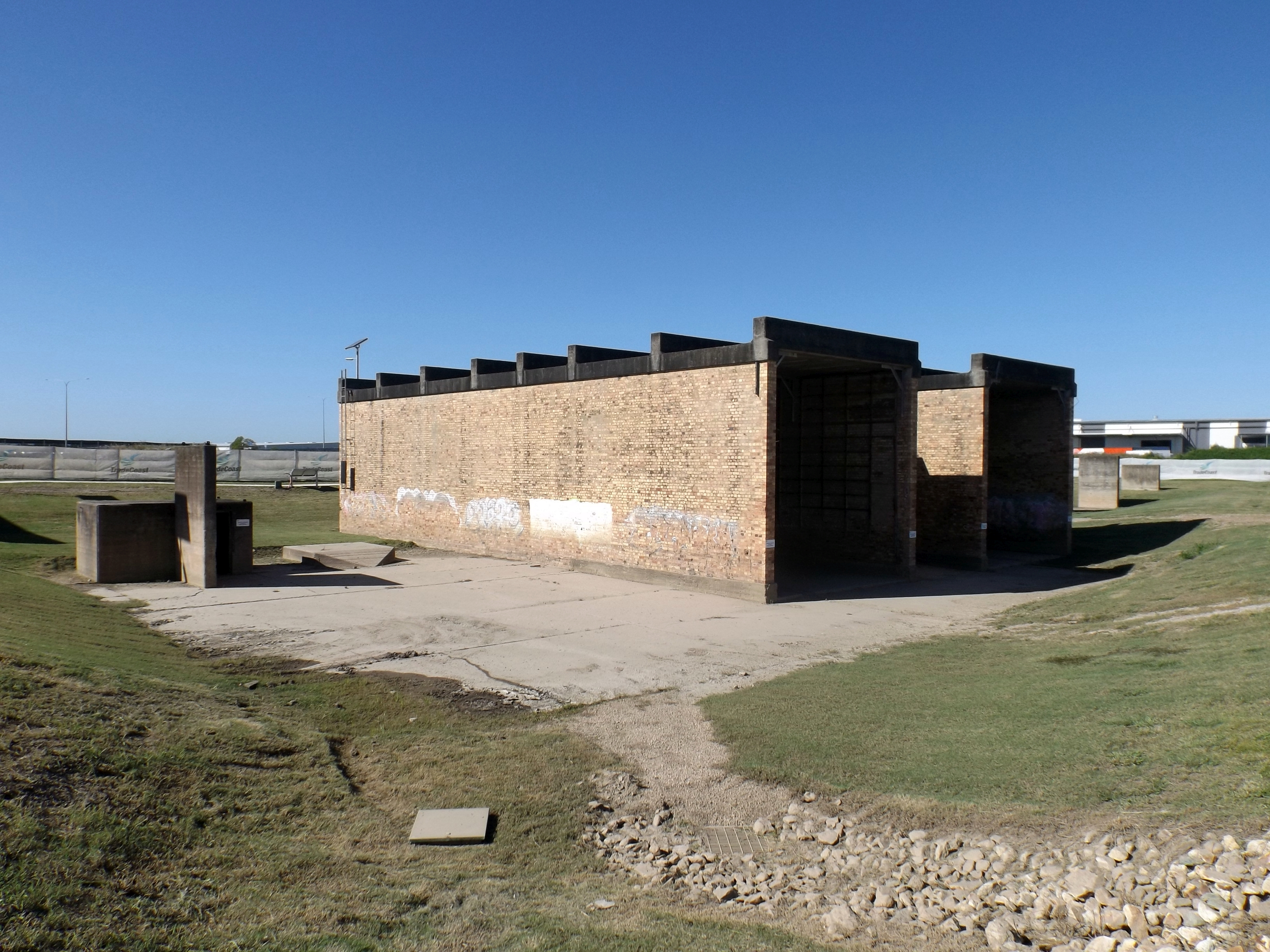
Allison Engine Testing Stands, 2015

The Allison Engine Testing Stands site is part of Brisbane's TradeCoast Central at the old Brisbane airport site in the suburb of Eagle Farm, where new and rebuilt World War II Allison V-12 in-line liquid cooled aero engines were tested in the open air prior to fitting into reassembled aircraft, notably the P38-Lightning, Curtis Kittyhawk and Bell Airacobra. The masonry sections of the remains, being buildings and dividers between the engine testing bays, are largely intact. The engines were refurbished at the Holden Breakfast Creek facility. Many of the workers in the Holden facility were women.

== Education ==
The nearest government primary school is in neighbouring Hamilton and the nearest government secondary school is Aviation State High School in neighbouring Hendra.

Gateway College opened in 1966. It is now known as TAFE Queensland SkillsTech, featuring trade courses such as electrical, plumbing, glass and glazing, renewable energy and electronics. Construction of a $40 million Robotics and Advanced Manufacturing Centre (RAMC) began in October 2023.

== See also ==
- History of Brisbane
