= Eagle Farm Women's Prison and Factory Site =

Eagle Farm Women's Prison and Factory
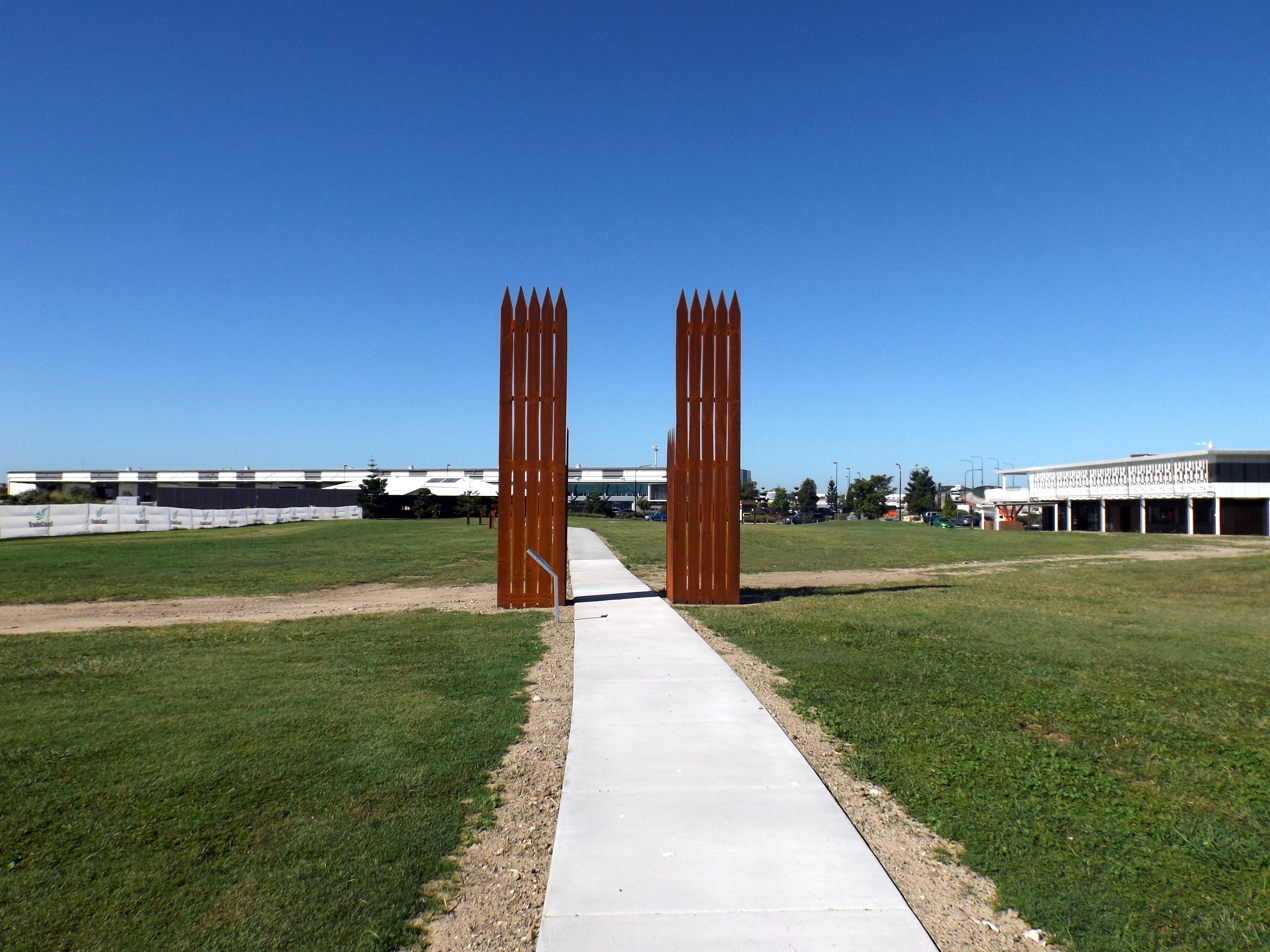
- Footpath through the site, 2015

- Location within Queensland
- 27.4262°S 153.0882°E
- Location: Schneider Road, Eagle Farm, City of Brisbane, Queensland, Australia

History
- Design period: 1824–1841 (convict settlement)
- Built: 1830–1839

Queensland Heritage Register
- Official name: Eagle Farm Women's Prison and Factory Site, Eagle Farm Agricultural Establishment, Eagle Farm Women's Prison and Factory
- Type: state heritage (archaeological)
- Designated: 7 February 2005
- Reference no.: 600186
- Significant period: 1830s (historical)
- Significant components: prison/factory/gaol

Eagle Farm Women's Prison and Factory Site (also known as Eagle Farm Agricultural Establishment) is a heritage-listed archaeological site on Schneider Road, Eagle Farm, City of Brisbane, Queensland, Australia. It operated between 1829 and 1839 as part of the Moreton Bay penal settlement. It is on the site now part of the Australia TradeCoast, previously the Eagle Farm Airport. It was added to the Queensland Heritage Register on 7 February 2005.

The site was listed on the Register of the National Estate and is also included on the Queensland Heritage Register. The site is historically important as one of a small number of convict sites remaining in Queensland with surviving original fabric (even though only as an archaeological deposit).

== History ==
Female convicts sent to the Moreton Bay penal settlement (who, like the men, were double offenders) were originally housed in a women's jail, or Female Factory, in Queen Street, Brisbane, on the site of the present General Post Office, Brisbane.

In September 1829 Commandant Patrick Logan of the Moreton Bay Penal Settlement founded a secondary agricultural establishment at Eagle Farm approximately eight miles from Brisbane. One hundred and fifty men were deployed to clear the scrub. By January 1832 about 680 acres (280 ha) were under cultivation with mostly maize and some potatoes, some cattle and pigs were also being raised. Working so near the Eagle Farm swamp caused a noticeable increase in malaria amongst the convicts, but despite calls for its abandonment, the farm was maintained. By 1836, 768 acres (311 ha) had been cleared, but no more than 46 acres (19 ha) were under cultivation. However, a historical report produced by Paul Ashron and Sue Rosen in 1990 suggests the area under cultivation was closer to 700 acres (280 ha). Prangley in "The Eagle Farm agricultural establishment" was unable to be definitive on this issue, saying the amount of actual area under cultivation "remains unclear".

The impetus to move the women convicts from Queen Street to Eagle Farm was their proximity to the main male population in Brisbane, which led to sexual forays between the women and soldiers and officials of the colony, despite the high stone walls of the factory being topped with broken glass. These forbidden fraternisations intensely annoyed the penal colony's Commandant, Captain Foster Fyans. Women caught were put in solitary confinement in tiny cells, put in irons or had their heads shaved. Patrick McDonald was replaced as supervisor for having aided and abetted access by amorous constables. In August 1836 Fyans caught the colony's Chief Constable climbing over the walls by means of an "ingenious ladder", which prompted him to reduce the numbers of women in Brisbane Town to 14 of the oldest.

There are conflicting reports about when the first female convicts started working at the farm and factory. The Queensland Heritage Register says by 1830, the Australian Heritage Database says by 1834. Prangley notes there is mention of three dairywomen in the work list for 1828, but these may have been associated with the principal colony farm at New Farm. All sources agree by 1836 there were 40 women, when conditions of the farm and factory were documented by the Quaker missionaries James Backhouse and George Walker.

Women worked in the fields and in the prison, doing needlework, laundry, unpicking ropes and even in road construction. Several timber slab buildings included the farm superintendent's house, a two-room building for male prisoners who did heavy work, the Matron's Quarters, a female factory with four rooms and sundry separate buildings including a one-room store, a one-room school and a one room hospital. The cook house had two rooms, one being a needle room where prisoners worked at sewing. The actual prison where women were locked up at night was a building containing six cells with a tall stockade or pallisade type fence, the outer wall 5.2-metre (17 ft) high poles, the tops of which were sharpened.

Stationing female felons at Eagle Farm was an attempt to reduce fraternisation between the women and male convicts and the military, with the latter being forbidden to cross the bridge at Breakfast Creek. Despite these precautions, assignations were frequent, occurring in the long grass around the farm.

In the first years of the penal settlement there was a substantial population of local Aborigines in the area, their numbers depending on the season. In April 1836 Dr Robertson, the penal surgeon, wrote of the long road between Brisbane and Eagle Farm passing through "the fishing ground of a tribe of aboriginal natives; at seasons of the year they are very dangerous and troublesome." This was at odds with the observations of Commandant Cotton the following year who wrote "the tribes which occupy the lands immediately adjacent to Brisbane Town, after an acquaintance of several years, come amongst us in confidence, a good understanding prevails between them and us… These tribes were formerly extremely hostile…".

By August 1836 the number of women at the original female factory in Queen Street had increased to 76. By the end of June 1836 the construction of strong slab cells at Eagle Farm was considered necessary and in 1837 all female prisoners in Brisbane Town were removed to Eagle Farm. By November 1838 the decision had been taken to abandon the Moreton Bay penal settlement and the numbers of convicts, both men and women, started declining rapidly as the penal settlement began to wind up.

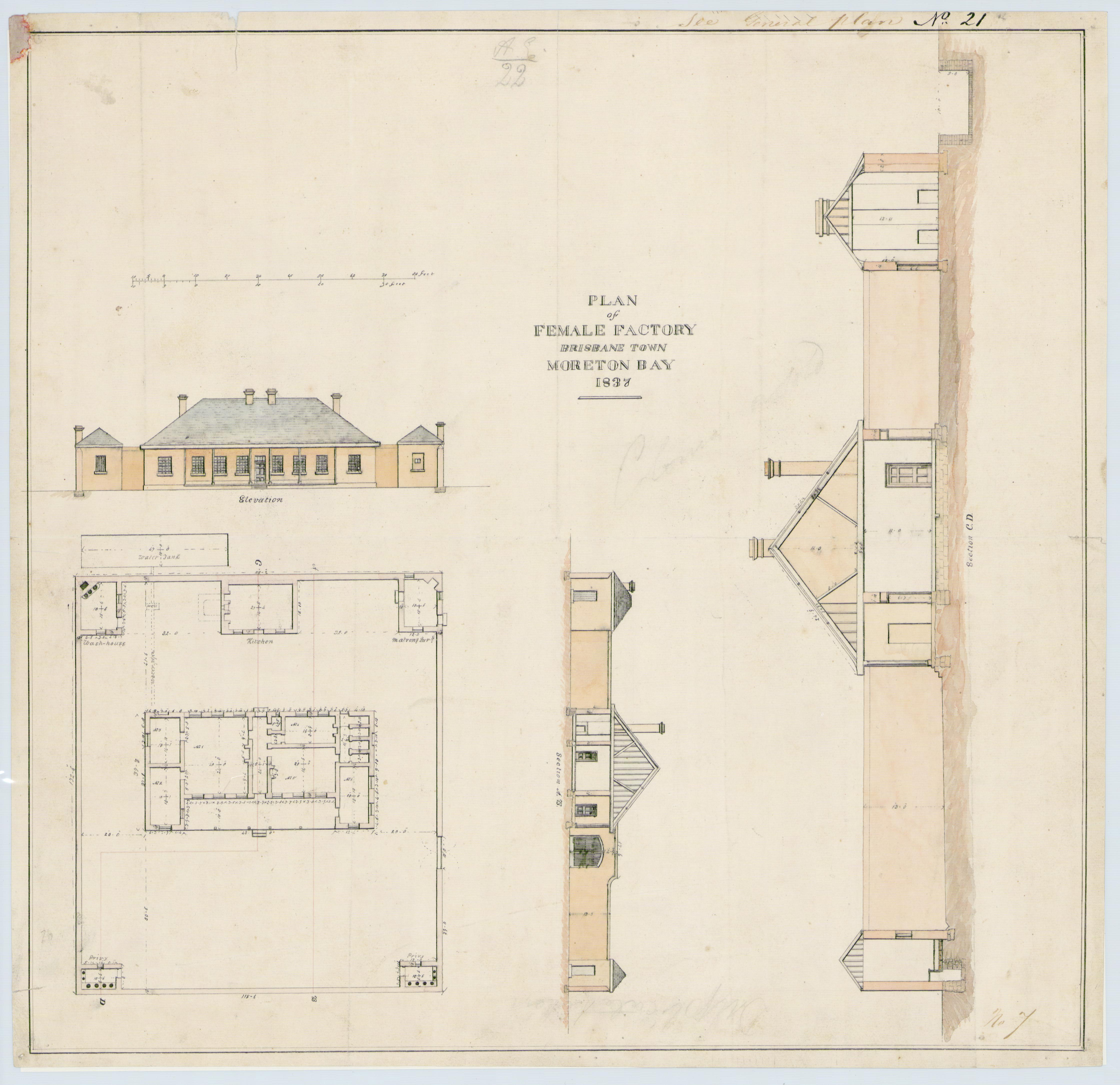
Plan of Female Factory, Brisbane Town, Moreton Bay 1837

By March 1839 the Eagle Farm Women's Prison and Factory consisted of a Supervisor's cottage with walls plastered internally and externally, with detached slab kitchen at rear. A two-roomed hut occupied by male convicts and two-roomed hut serving as matron's quarters, with another room under construction and a slab kitchen at rear. All were slab buildings including the Female Factory which comprised a number of four-roomed accommodation buildings; a store, a school, a hospital (plastered) and workhouse, each of one room; a two-roomed building housing the cook house and needle room; and a block of six cells. The area was surrounded by a double fence, the outer being a stockade of strut poles with sharp tops, 17 feet (5.2 m) high, 320 feet (98 m) long and 311 feet (95 m) deep.

In May 1839 the remaining 57 convict women were shipped to Sydney and the penal settlement at Eagle Farm was effectively closed, becoming a government cattle station by 1841. In 1841 the superintendent's quarters were occupied by assistant surveyor Robert Dixon and then briefly by Stephen Simpson, Commissioner for Crown Lands. In 1842 the land was surveyed, put up for public auction and subsequently farmed.

From the 1840s to the 1930s the land was used for mixed farming including citrus fruit, dairying, cattle grazing, and small crops. Aborigines were known to raid produce and dwellings in the vicinity of Brisbane including small farms from Breakfast Creek to Eagle Farm, mostly in the period 1845–54 after the penal settlement was closed down and the area was opened to white settlers. In 1850, 31 Aborigines armed with spears and waddies descended on Breakfast Creek and dug up the potatoes of Martin Frawley, the former convict miller turned farmer.

The buildings on the women's prison site were demolished at an unknown date. The superintendent's house was thought to have survived until at least 1890.

In 1922, the land was acquired by the Australian Government for an aerodrome, the Eagle Farm Airport. In 1925 a hangar was built for government use and in 1927 a hangar was built for Qantas. Aviation pioneers such as Charles Kingsford Smith, Charles Ulm, Bert Hinkler and Amy Johnson used the airport. The site ceased operation as an aerodrome in 1931, although it continued to be used for gliders. However, in World War II, the site was refurbished in 1942 as a major airbase for the US Pacific Military Command. This involved covering the site with fill of variable depth. After the war, in 1949 Eagle Farm became Brisbane's main airport, known as Brisbane Airport. In 1988 the airport closed again, aviation moving to the present Cribb Island site as Brisbane Airport. The women's prison site then became an open grassed area.

The site remains one of only six surviving in Brisbane from the convict period, with the former Moreton Bay penal settlement being one of only seven sites in Australia associated with secondary punishment.

== Description ==
The old Eagle Farm airport, of which the site of the former Eagle Farm convict settlement forms part, is bounded on the south by Lamington Avenue and the Pinkenba Railway, to the east by Viola Place, to the west by the Gateway Arterial Road, to the north-west by a drainage channel and to the north-east by Lomandra Drive and Cassia Place. The land in the centre of the area is now flat and featureless, apart from remnant structures from WWII and the remains of runways from the post- war development of the airport.

Virtually none of the old airport area exists as it did prior to European settlement. Only the foundations of the Eagle Farm Settlement survive, having been covered with fill in 1942. The Allison Engine Testing Stands and Second World War Hangar No. 7 from World War II also survived on the former airport site and are both separately heritage-listed.

== Heritage listing ==
Eagle Farm Women's Prison and Factory Site was listed on the Queensland Heritage Register on 7 February 2005 having satisfied the following criteria.

The place is important in demonstrating the evolution or pattern of Queensland's history.

The Eagle Farm Women's Prison and Factory Site is significant as one of few sites surviving in Brisbane from the convict period and a remnant of only seven sites associated with secondary punishment in Australia. Further, the Women's Prison and Factory Site is one of even fewer sites, both in Brisbane and in the national context, associated specifically with female felons.

The place demonstrates rare, uncommon or endangered aspects of Queensland's cultural heritage.

The Eagle Farm Women's Prison and Factory Site is significant as one of the earliest sites of building activity in Queensland, initial construction having occurred within 5 years of the establishment of the settlement of Brisbane Town.

The place has potential to yield information that will contribute to an understanding of Queensland's history.

The Eagle Farm Women's Prison and Factory Site has potential to reveal substrata evidence of a number of factors including the administration of the convict system in the final years of transportation, the confinement and punishment of female convicts, building materials and construction technology and artefacts associated with the activities, occupations and social status of groups and individuals.

The place has a strong or special association with a particular community or cultural group for social, cultural or spiritual reasons.

The establishment of the Eagle Farm Women's Prison and Factory Site is associated with early historical figures such as New South Wales Governor, Ralph Darling and Commandant Logan.

== See also ==
- History of Brisbane
