= Australia TradeCoast =

Economic development area of Brisbane

Australia TradeCoast is an economic development area of Brisbane, the state capital of Queensland, Australia.

== History ==
The concept of branding and promoting the empty space around the Port of Brisbane and Brisbane Airport, following many years of government reports and investigations on what might be done with the "Brisbane Gateway Ports Area", was first proposed to then Queensland Premier Peter Beattie by a 3PR marketing consultant who had developed Amsterdam Airport Area for Amsterdam Airport Schiphol.

Beattie took up the idea with enthusiasm, so a partnership was formed between the Queensland Government, Brisbane City Council, Brisbane Airport and the Port of Brisbane to drive the project forward. The brand and organisational details were announced at a press conference at Brisbane Airport in May 1999.

Australia TradeCoast is expected to release and develop 1,300 hectares (3,200 acres) of land by 2026. In 2014, there were 32 industry precincts. Brisbane Airport Corporation has nine commercial precincts for activities including freight warehousing and distribution centres. The Port of Brisbane has 6.5 kilometres (4.0 mi) of quayline, 1,047 hectares (2,590 acres) of land holdings and 999 hectares (2,470 acres) of wet land. TradeCoast Central Precinct has 120 hectares (300 acres) of master planned industrial community and corporate office park. Business activities within the Australia TradeCoast region include around 1,500 businesses with over 60,000 employees. The region is forecast to employ more than 110,000 people by 2026.

== Industry sectors ==
The second largest Queensland business precinct after Brisbane's central business district, Australia Trade Coast is targeting the following industry sectors:

- Aviation and aerospace
- Building and construction
- Business services
- Food manufacturing
- Innovative manufacturing
- Retail
- Shipping and marine
- Transport and logistics.

== Board of directors ==
Australia TradeCoast's board has representatives from the organisation's shareholding partner, including the Port of Brisbane Pty Ltd, Brisbane Airport Corporation, Department of Employment, Economic Development and Innovation and Brisbane City Council – Brisbane Marketing.

- Russell Smith – chair
- Rob Whiddon – Trade and Investment Queensland's managing director
- Julieanne Alroe – Brisbane Airport Corporation managing director and CEO
- David Askern – Brisbane City Council chief legal officer
- John Aitken – chief executive officer of Brisbane Marketing

== Trade Coast Central ==
TradeCoast Central is a fully integrated masterplanned corporate office park and industrial community on the former Eagle Farm Airport site adjacent to the Gateway Motorway. Three notable heritage sites lie within Trade Coast Central, the convict era Eagle Farm Agricultural Establishment, the Women's Prison and Female Factory and the World War II Allison Engine Testing Stands.
