= Second World War Hangar No. 7 =

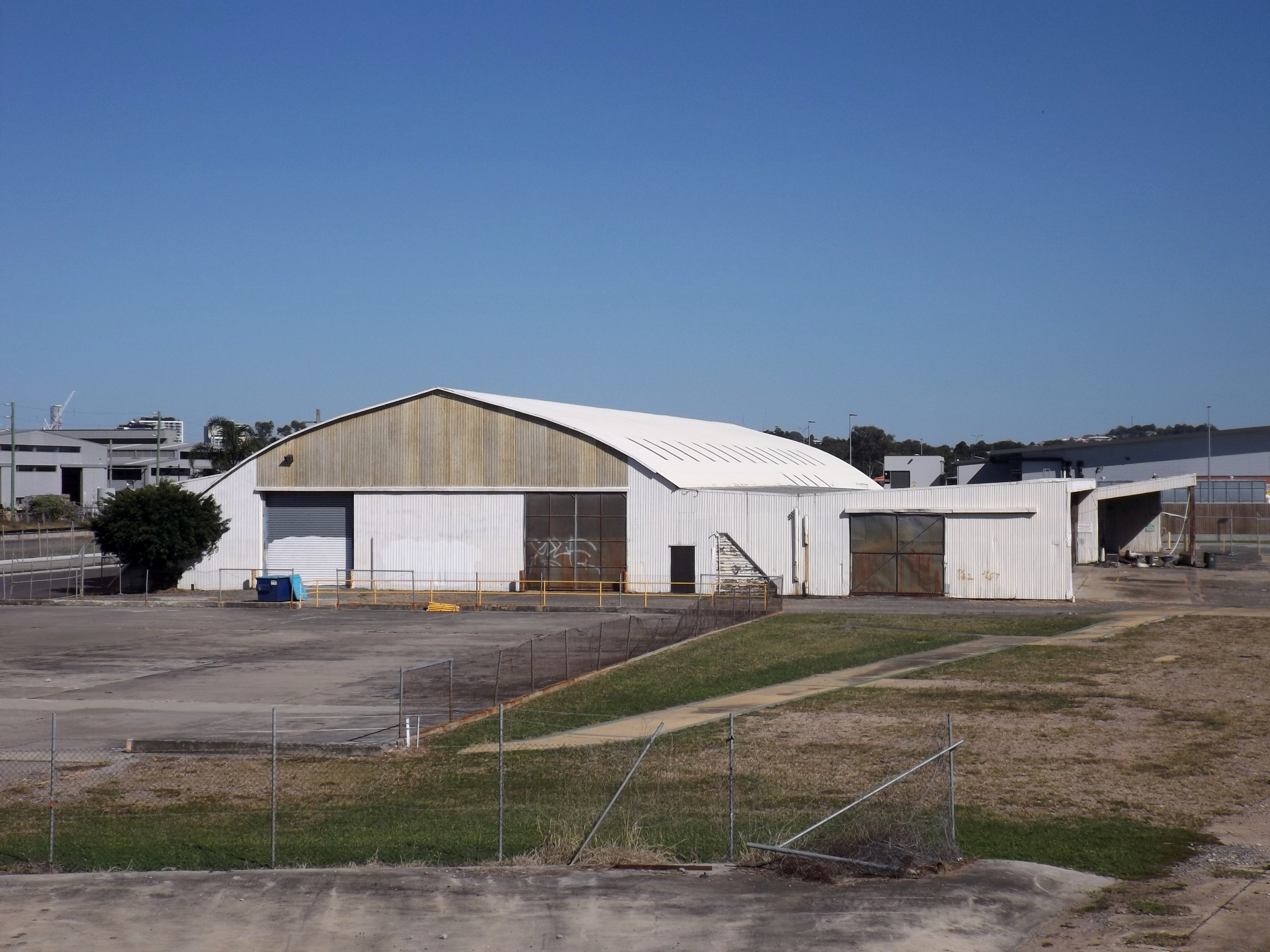
- Hangar in 2015

- Location within Queensland Location within Australia
- 27.4287°S 153.087°E
- Location: 116 Lamington Avenue, Eagle Farm, City of Brisbane, Queensland, Australia

History
- Design period: 1939–1945 (World War II)
- Built: 1942–c. 1952

Site notes
- Architect: US Army

Queensland Heritage Register
- Official name: Second World War Hangar No. 7
- Type: state heritage (built)
- Designated: 7 February 2005
- Reference no.: 601007
- Significant period: 1940s–1950s (fabric); 1940s–1970s (historical)
- Builders: Manuel Richard Hornibrook

Second World War Hangar No. 7 is a heritage-listed hangar at 116 Lamington Avenue, Eagle Farm, City of Brisbane, Queensland, Australia. It was designed by the United States Army and built from 1942 to c. 1952 by Manuel Richard Hornibrook. It was added to the Queensland Heritage Register on 7 February 2005.

== History ==
=== History of the Site to the Second World War ===
The Second World War Hangar No.7, located fronting Terminal Drive on the site of the old Brisbane Airport, is a timber truss igloo structure with ribbed metal sheet cladding. The hangar was constructed in 1942 for the use of the Allied Technical Air Intelligence Unit (ATAIU), as part of a major aircraft assembly depot and aerodrome under the control of the US 81st Air Depot Group, and under the US 5th Air Force under the command of General Douglas MacArthur's Supreme Headquarters of the South West Pacific Area. It is the last surviving World War II timber truss igloo structure at Eagle Farm.

The structure is located adjacent to the Eagle Farm Women's Prison and Factory Site, the remains of which are located beneath the southeast end of runway 13/31.

In September 1829 Commandant Patrick Logan of the Moreton Bay penal settlement founded a secondary agricultural establishment approximately 8 miles (13 km) from the town at Eagle Farm. Female convicts are recorded at Eagle Farm from 1830, and in 1837 all female prisoners in Brisbane Town were removed to Eagle Farm.

By November 1838 the decision had been taken to abandon the Moreton Bay penal settlement, and by July 1839 all the female convicts had been removed. Eagle Farm was virtually abandoned, although it was still functioning as a government cattle station in 1841.

In 1842 the land was surveyed, put up for public auction and subsequently farmed. The buildings were demolished at an unknown date.

The land on which Hangar No.7 stands was purchased by John Westaway in April 1864. After his death in 1867, title passed to William Westaway who subsequently subdivided the land, and the area of concern was sold to Alonzo Sparkes in April 1914. Doomben Park Recreation Grounds Ltd purchased the site in October 1920, and it was leased in 1932 for 7 years to James Macfarlane and George Rea, after which it was acquired by the Commonwealth.

The opening of the mouth of the Brisbane River to deep water shipping, and the construction of the railway to Pinkenba stimulated growth in the area around Eagle Farm, and housing subdivisions gradually displaced the pastoral uses of the land.

The land at Eagle Farm was inspected by Captain E C Johnston, Superintendent of Aerodromes Civil Aviation Department, in February 1922 as a site for a civil aerodrome. This land (to the north of the site of hangar 7) was subsequently surveyed and acquired from William Lynn and David Wilson for a total cost of £5,464.0.8. The Commonwealth gazettal notice of the aerodrome site occurred on 29 June 1922, and at that time the site was described as containing 84 acres 2 roods 2.3 perches of partly cleared land with black soils, scattered heavy gum and ironbark, and some good grazing areas.

In July 1922 it was intended to lease portions of the aerodrome to various commercial aviation companies, and from 1923 the intention to acquire adjoining lands for expansion of the aerodrome was being expressed. A grass airstrip was formed in 1923, and a layout for hangar blocks with a caretaker's cottage was prepared in February 1924. The Brisbane Civil Aviation hangar was constructed c. 1925, and the first commercial operations were commenced by Qantas in 1926, who formed the Brisbane Flying Training School in 1927.

By August 1928, when the Australian Aero Club held their second annual Aerial Pageant, a second hangar housing Qantas was located adjacent to the north of the Brisbane Civil Aviation hangar, with a caretakers cottage to the south. The aerial pageant included such events as the Balloon Strafe, where small gas filled balloons were released and the aeroplanes would endeavour to burst them with their propellers in flight. The pageant also included aerobatics, an aerial derby, speed championships, bombing displays, novelty events, crazy flying, parachute descents and an air battle. The entrance to the aerodrome was from the east off Schneider Road adjacent to Mr Wilson's property.

In 1927 Captain Johnston, then Director of Civil Aerodromes Civil Aviation Department, was again looking at acquiring adjacent lands, in particular the Doomben Park Recreation Grounds racecourse straight located to the south of the aerodrome, but costs were prohibitive and much of the surrounding land suffered from poor drainage.

The most significant event to occur in this period was the landing of the Southern Cross in June 1928. Squadron Leader Charles Kingsford Smith and Charles Ulm completed the first trans-Pacific flight from California to Brisbane, landing at Eagle Farm. Kingsford-Smith and Ulm formed Australian National Airlines in 1929 and initiated scheduled services between Melbourne, Sydney and Brisbane. Also of note in 1928, Squadron Leader Bert Hinkler AFC completed the first solo flight from England to Australia in 16 days in a light aeroplane.

In 1928 it was decided to acquire an area of land at Rocklea for use as a civil aerodrome in lieu of Eagle Farm. In August 1929 it was stated that as soon as the aerodrome at Rocklea (now Archerfield Airport) was acquired and prepared, flying activities would be transferred from Eagle Farm which would then be available for disposal. The two existing hangars would be moved but the caretakers cottage on the site would remain.

In 1929 the site was placed with the Department of the Interior for sale, and several options for disposal of the property were considered, including industrial sites or to the general public in broad acre lots or by subdivision. In 1931 it was assessed as having a poor prospect of sale, and it was recommended to lease the land until the real estate market improved. At this time the aerodrome was not required by the Department of Defence, and only one aircraft concern (Aircrafts [sic] Pty Ltd) was still operating from the site. The land was leased to Messrs Wilson and Campbell for the grazing of cattle and horses.

David Wilson died in September 1934, and his interest in the partnership passed to his widow Margaret Wilson. The partnership held the lease until March 1940. Part of the lease arrangements was that the Queensland Gliding Association was to be allowed to use the site on public holidays, to erect hangars on the land, and to install water supply and any conveniences.

In June 1939 the aerodrome site was still being considered for sale, and the prospects of the area were thought to have improved due to Brisbane City Council policies on oil storage depot locations, the erection of wharves at Hamilton, Queensland Government development of the area between Eagle Farm Road and the river, the development of industries in the area, and the small amount of available vacant land. The site was valued at £4,200.

At this time, the Minister for Civil Aviation, James Valentine Fairbairn, mentioned that the site was very suitable for training purposes, and directed that it be retained. Captain Johnston, who originally selected the site, also stated that it was suitable for instructional purposes. This decision is likely related to Fairbairn's attendance at a meeting in Ottawa in December 1939 in which the details of the Empire Air Training Scheme were concluded. Australia had declared war on Germany on 3 September 1939, and the importance placed on the retention of Eagle Farm is reflected in Fairbairn's report to Prime Minister Robert Menzies that the "only activity that we have undertaken which could lead to the winning or losing of the war by our failure or success in carrying out our undertaking is the Empire Air Training Scheme".

=== Military Aviation in Australia, and Events Leading to the Second World War ===
The Australian Flying Corps were involved in the First World War as part of the Army. Following the establishment of the Royal Air Force in 1918, Australia's Minister for Defence, Senator George Foster Pearce, appointed the Swinburne Committee to report on the needs of military aviation. Australia's involvement in the Imperial defence strategy inevitably placed its senior military commanders in a position subordinate to their British counterparts, and as its starting point the Committee accepted the strategy's basis that Australia's security would continue to be based on sea power. The committee found that while they supported the establishment of an air service, they rejected any suggestion that it should have an independent role. Any Australian air force would exist solely to support the sea and land forces.

The Committee recommended the formation of a single, separate air corps, which would be administered by an Air Board composed of members of the Naval and Military Boards, while the wings of the corps allotted to the Navy and Army were to be controlled by the Naval and Military Boards respectively. Cabinet approved the proposal on 18 February 1919, and the Air Board was formed with the Air Corps key role determined as surveillance. The Navy and Army had their own tasks for the air service, and in April 1920 put forward a proposal for the formation of an air force to meet certain fundamental needs of the Navy and Army, which included torpedo bombers, patrol planes, flying boats and seaplanes, fighting planes, reconnaissance planes and bombers. The Air Corps became the Royal Australian Air Force on 31 March 1921 with a total complement of 21 officers, and the bulk of its aircraft came as a gift from the Imperial government and consisted of essentially obsolete machines left over from the First World War.

The Royal Australian Air Force (RAAF) came into being as the world's second separate air force, and its establishment coincided with the decision to place defence spending on a peacetime basis for the first time since the First World War. In 1924, the Air Board described the RAAF's condition as most unsatisfactory and that it survived on a hand-to-mouth existence, with 65 officers and 300 men and only two machines fit for war. Defence funding became even tighter in the Depression years, and the situation did not improve until the mid-1930s with the growing threat of war and easing of the Depression.

A particularly strong anti-RAAF move emerged in 1929 when there was a possibility that the Air Force would be dismembered and split between the other two forces, a threat which was apparent until after the mid-1930s. This coincided with Salmond Report of 1928 which recommended that Australia substitute air power (due to its speed, mobility, flexibility and offensive striking power) for sea and land power. As the Air Force entered the 1930s, it was still equipped with 1916–17 types of machines, although the growing threat of the Japanese air force had been recognised as early as 1925 in the Memorandum Regarding the Air Defence of Australia by Air Commodore Williams.

The 1920s had seen a vast improvement across the spectrum of aircraft performance, particularly in range and reliability. This was highlighted in 1928 when Squadron Leader Charles Kingsford-Smith and Charles Ulm completed the first trans-Pacific flight from California to Brisbane landing at Eagle Farm, and Squadron Leader Bert Hinkler AFC completed the first solo flight from England to Australia in 16 days in a light aeroplane. The capability now existed for long range strike operations against enemy shipping.

Australia's defence independence was constrained by the commitment to the Imperial strategy and the British connection. The Imperial Conference of 1923 declared that the basis of the Empire's security was the sheltering screen provided by the Royal Navy, a judgement which was confirmed at subsequent conferences until 1937. Twice during the interwar period, a review of the RAAF was thought necessary, but in each occasion the government turned to an RAF officer, resulting in the Salmond Report of 1928 and the Ellington Report of 1938.

Germany had invaded Poland on 1 September 1939, and on 3 September 1939 Australia declared war on Germany.

The RAF realised that if massive expansion were necessary, Britain had the industrial capacity to increase aircraft production but it would not be able to train enough aircrew from British sources. Through Australia's commitment to the defence of Britain, agreement was reached that Australia and other Dominions would participate in a massive training program, subsequently known as the Empire Air Training Scheme, the details of which were concluded at a meeting in Ottawa in December 1939. Australia contributed over 27,000 men to the scheme throughout the Second World War.

The RAAF's involvement in the South West Pacific Area (SWPA) was more complex than in Europe.

At this date, there were 12 RAAF squadrons, of which two existed in nucleus only and four were citizen force. The aircraft inventory consisted entirely of obsolescent machines. In Brisbane, aviation activities centred on Archerfield and Amberley (under construction).

The aerodrome was taken over by the RAAF for Flying Training purposes on 8 March 1940, and the Wilson and Campbell lease was terminated. In June 1940 the aerodrome accommodated the RAAF No.2 Elementary Flying Training School, as Relief Landing Ground property 41.

On 7 December 1941 the US Navy Pacific Fleet in Pearl Harbor was attacked by the Japanese. A US convoy bound for the Philippines was redirected to Brisbane, arriving on 22 December 1941. Shortly after the entry of Japan into the War, Australian foreign policy appeared to make its most dramatic shift since Federation. On 27 December 1941 Prime Minister John Curtin stated "Without any inhibitions of any kind I make it quite clear that Australia looks to America, free of any pangs as to our traditional links of kinship with the United Kingdom ... we shall exert all our energies toward the shaping of a plan, with the United States as its cornerstone."

At this time, the RAAF did not have a fighter remotely capable of combating the Japanese Zero, which served the Japanese Naval units.

By February 1942 Japanese forces had gained footholds in territories adjoining northern Australia which made it seem probable that the advance southwards would continue, culminating in the invasion of Australia. This threat of invasion in 1942 is summarised in a statement made by Prime Minister Curtin in 1944, in which he said now that Singapore was lost and we were unable to concentrate a superior fleet, the strength of our defences was inadequate to defend Australia ... against an enemy with command of the sea and air. We lacked air support, possessing no fighters whatsoever, and our bomber and reconnaissance planes had been reduced to about 50 machines. No country faced a greater danger with less resources than Australia.

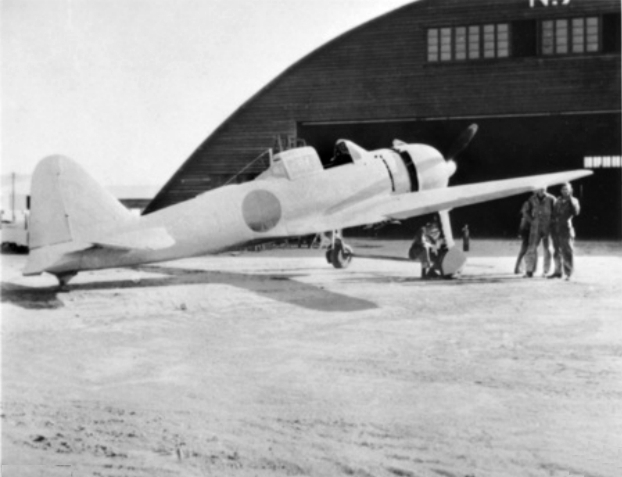
Captured A6M3 outside Hangar No. 7

The RAAF had not performed well up until this time, with their involvement in the Far East campaign consisting of a series of devastatingly quick defeats, and a humiliating flight down the Malay Peninsula to Singapore and the Netherlands East Indies before final defeat or capture. On 19 February 1942 the Japanese bombed Darwin, and the Darwin Air Station was not well prepared. Several Australian and American aircraft were destroyed on the ground or shot down, and large numbers of the RAAF deserted their posts with 278 personnel still missing four days after the attack.

It was against this background that the decision to place the RAAF under General Douglas MacArthur was made on 18 April 1942. The directive appointing General MacArthur as Supreme Commander of the South West Pacific Area (SWPA) placed under his control all armed forces which the governments concerned have assigned, or may assign, to this area.

=== Second World War Construction Work at Eagle Farm ===
The acquisition of the six furlong (1320 yards) straight extension of Doomben Racecourse and adjacent land bordering the southern boundary of the aerodrome was proposed on 11 December 1941 and was valued at £1,727. The official transfer of the land did not actually occur until February 1954.

The US Convoy, which arrived in Brisbane on 22 December 1941, had crated aircraft on board which required unloading, assembling and flying to their Clark Field destination in the Philippines. A decision was made in January 1942 to develop Eagle Farm as a major aircraft erection depot and aerodrome from which the planes could proceed. Eagle Farm had direct road and rail links to Brisbane, it was close to port facilities and had potential for expansion and provision of multiple runways. The total cost of the development work to Eagle Farm over three years to the end of 1944 was £559,687.

Recognising the need for a co-ordinating agency for all Australian construction of a military nature, an Allied Works Council (AWC) was formed on 25 February 1942, and the works were mainly carried out by the Civil Construction Corps, into which labour and manpower could be drafted. The AWC was disbanded in September 1945.

The straight six extension of the Doomben Racecourse was utilised as a ready made apron for the hangars which were to be built. Initial works were delayed by heavy rain for three weeks converting the ground to a quagmire, and as a result thousands of feet of ashes and coke breeze were carted from the gasworks and deposited in order to keep trucks moving with borrow material from Nudgee. By 18 February 1942 the construction of one hangar had begun and the SW-NE runway was nearing completion. Shiploads of aircraft components were arriving at the port and had to be transported to Amberley for assembly until Eagle Farm was ready. The Americans advised that the runways were urgently needed for the fighter plane protection of Brisbane, and as a result two ten-hour shifts were organised using 100 trucks which hauled 33,000 cubic yards of fill to complete the section, and on 29 March 1942 a squadron of P-39 aircraft landed.

The caretaker's cottage at Eagle Farm was repaired to be used as a flight office and daily accommodation for RAAF personnel. Construction of hangars 1 and 2 had begun to the south of the straight six section, and further urgent works were proposed to begin in March 1942, consisting of four 96-foot (29 m) span hangars (No.s 3,4,8 and 9) of a total of twelve, for an Erection Depot for the US Army Air Corps. This caused some initial problems, as a Colonel Snead stated that he did not want any hangars at Eagle Farm as he had been instructed to operate the aerodrome as a pursuit field, and had 18 fighters based at the field and as such it was inadvisable to have an assembly depot close by.

The construction of hangars 3,4,8 and 9, to an Australianised RAF Type A 1917 design, were begun by contractor TH Dennis, but in April construction work ceased and the hangars were relocated to Charleville. This situation changed quickly, and the hangars were relocated back to Eagle Farm from circa November 1942, to eventually double the length of hangars 1 and 2, and create hangars 3 and 3A (work was still being carried out in January 1944).

By April 1942, Anti Aircraft Artillery units were disposed to protect the wharf areas near Eagle Farm, and camouflage painting of the hangars had begun, as well as treatment to the aerodrome and nearby Emergency Military Camps at Doomben and Ascot Racecourses.

The US Army 81st Air Depot Group was established on 11 May 1942 by order of the War Department in Washington with Headquarters and Supply Squadron located in Brisbane. The Group controlled all services operations relating to aircraft assembly, maintenance and reconstruction initially at Amberley, Tocumwal (NSW) and at Eagle Farm. These activities were centred on Eagle Farm after August 1942.

In June 1942 the possession of nearby houses and land was taken under the provisions of National Security Legislation for the construction of essential runways This was gazetted in July 1943. Cottages were removed intact to a site selected by the owner, with compensation paid for the value of the land with any improvements. The owners had to purchase the new sites themselves, and periodical compensation was paid by the Airboard from the date of possession in June 1942.

The Supreme Headquarters of the South West Pacific Area (SWPA), under the Commander-in-Chief of Allied Forces, General Douglas MacArthur, was based in Brisbane in the AMP Building (now known as MacArthur Central). Tenants were compulsorily evacuated under military orders from 21 July 1942 until 14 June 1945.

In October 1942, Manuel Richard Hornibrook was commissioned by the US Army to erect four large stores at Eagle Farm, most likely hangars 4,5,6 and 7 of an igloo design. The igloo is a form of light nailed timber arch construction. These hangars were built fronting the straight six section, as a ready made apron, with hangar 7 built for the Allied Technical Air Intelligence Unit (ATAIU) located separately at the end of the straight. These hangars were based on the US Army 104-foot (32 m) span timber box frame design and were clad with galvanised iron, but when that material was restricted, terne-coated iron was used, a lead-tin coating usually used for fuel tank manufacture. There were various igloo designs, but the AWC designs were considered to be far more rugged than US designs, and were designed to have a reasonably long life under winds of up to 65 miles per hour (105 km/h), and used standard grade Group C hardwood timber.

The defence building program brought about severe shortages in materials and manpower. The priority for labour and materials, particularly steel, was directed into the war effort which resulted in innovative methods for construction. The AWC engineers adapted themselves to designing all types of timber framed buildings, in some cases utilising green timber due to shortages of seasoned timber. While most structures were designed to be temporary, wartime working stresses were adopted at least 33% greater than normal working stresses.

The standard igloo design resulted from a need for lightweight prefabricated structures which could be quickly erected as aircraft hideouts, or shelters in more remote areas. It has been assumed that the timber lattice arch truss design was based on American steel lattice structures. However, Emil Brizay, a French engineer refugee from Singapore in the office of MR Hornibrook is also credited with designing the construction system on which the igloo was modelled. The igloos at Eagle Farm were one of several designs for lightweight long span structures which utilised timber in small sectional sizes of chords to enable the lattice trusses to be hand nailed in jigs on site and speedily erected at low cost.

These timber truss igloos were widely used, and known locations include Garbutt near Townsville, Cairns, Eagle Farm, Allison Engine Works at Breakfast Creek, Schofield Army Base and Archerfield Airfield.

Hangar 8, a US Butler prefabricated steel portal framed structure located to the northeast of hangar 7, was the last hangar to be constructed in the Second World War period, apparently between May 1943 and July 1944, as a shelter area for aircraft reconstructed by the ATAIU. It was originally erected with a canvas curtain entry and metal roof cladding. Metal side cladding was added later.

=== Allied Technical Air Intelligence Unit (ATAIU) ===
With the outbreak of the Pacific War on 7 December 1941, Allied Forces had little or no concrete knowledge about Japanese aircraft and their performance capabilities. The air war over China had been in full swing for over four years, little attempt had been made by Allied Intelligence agencies to learn very much about the Japanese equipment, tactics and potential. Due to severe cuts in military funding following WWI, intelligence units had not been developed for gathering and disseminating this type of information, and the bulk of concern was placed on Hitler's growing airpower and conquests in Europe. Once the US was involved in the War with Japan, there was a frantic effort to fill this information void. There was no meaningful list of Japanese aircraft types, and no way to identify these aircraft when encountered in combat. During this period, every single-engine Japanese fighter was identified as a Zero, and anything else was called a Mitsubishi or a Nakajima.

To sort out this dilemma became the sole responsibility of the Allied Technical Air Intelligence Unit (ATAIU) South West Pacific Area. In addition to developing a common means of identifying these aircraft by type, it was essential that the new unit obtain information to develop drawings and models, as well as acquiring photographs. The unit's responsibility was to discover construction techniques, weaknesses, strengths, and latest camouflage techniques. Gathering performance information in comparison to Allied aircraft was essential for developing combat tactics with which to counter the Japanese.

The ATAIU, a small group of intelligence personnel, was formed in Victoria Barracks, Melbourne, and later moved to Brisbane under the US 5th Air Force under the command of General MacArthur's Supreme Headquarters of the SWPA in late 1942/early 1943. The project had the direct authorisation of General George C Kenney, Commander of Allied Air Forces in the SWPA. Its staff headquarters were in the AMP Building (MacArthur Central) while the technical examination, reconstruction and simulated combat trials with captured Japanese aircraft was located at hangar 7, Eagle Farm. The 81st Air Depot Group controlled all operational activities of these aircraft.

Hangar 7 was the fourth timber framed igloo on the airfield, located some distance from the others at the end of straight six for security reasons. It became the workshops for the ATAIU, and was rectangular in plan with personnel access from centrally located skillion roofed door openings. The west end was clad with weatherboard, with a large central doorway for aircraft access. The building had corrugated iron roof sheeting with flush skylights as it had no artificial lighting. Internally it was divided by low partitions, creating separate cells for the various tasks associated with dismantling, analysing and reassembling the captured aircraft. Each cell had its own specialisation, which included workshops for aircraft engines, navigation systems, radio, weapons, and body reconstruction.

The group had to first collate field information, importantly descriptions of new planes that aircrew could only glimpse in battle. To overcome the confusion caused by the complex method of identifying the ever increasing number of Japanese aircraft types, a system of assigning easily remembered code names to each type was adopted. The Japanese-plane nickname system which came into common usage throughout the Allied air forces was developed. A different name was assigned to each aircraft as it became known to exist, and common first names were chosen.

To keep the plan simple, male names were given to fighters and float planes, and female names to bombers, reconnaissance aircraft and flying boats. Names beginning with T were given to the few transport planes in the Japanese inventory. Trainers were given names of trees, and gliders given names of birds. With the approval of MacArthur, the MacArthur Southwest Pacific Code Name System came into being, circa September 1942, with an initial list of 50 names. The Tennessee background of Captain Frank McCoy, who was in charge of the ATAIU, was evident immediately because the initial names had a distinct hill-country flavour, such as Zeke, Rufe, Luke, Nate and others. The ATAIU quickly exhausted its list of hillbilly names and turned to names of friends and relatives.

Foreign designers and engineers had been widely employed in Japan's aviation industry prior to 1935, after which a curtain of secrecy had been pulled over Japan's aviation development. These new aircraft were being employed in the air war over China, with the first recorded crash of a Zero being made at Kunming, China in February 1941. It was not until a year later that enough information was gathered to be able to assign it the code name Zeke.

During the first six months of the war, technical intelligence information was almost non-existent due to Air Corps units being in constant retreat and lacking sufficient personnel. Once the Allies were on the offensive, downed enemy planes were able to be returned to flying condition by the ATAIU at Eagle Farm. Buna, in New Guinea, and Guadalcanal, in the Solomons, were the first Allied land victories in the Pacific after nearly ten months of defeat.

Initially the field intelligence units inspected downed aircraft, but name plates were in Japanese and serial numbers were designed to be misleading, and few Allied field intelligence personnel read and understood Japanese. In many instances, the ATAIU relied on the assistance of indigenous work crews to retrieve the downed aircraft from remote areas and transport them to the coast, often dragging them through swamps or floating them down rivers on rafts.

A new version of the Zero, which served with the Japanese Naval units, was causing great concern, and battered examples were retrieved from the Buna-Gona area of New Guinea in January 1943. Field inspections gave some answers, but comparative rebuilding and trialing of it against Allied fighters, engaging in combat exercises, was needed. This aircraft was eventually named the Hamp (originally Hap after US Army Air Force Chief of Staff General Hap Arnold) and later named Zeke 32 when it was found to be a variant of Zeke 21, a Mitsubishi A6M3, Naval Type O Model 32 fighter. Australian ground forces were the first to come upon the new Zeke 32 when they occupied Buna airstrip on New Guinea in January 1943.

In most cases technical manuals were not available, so everything was worked out on a trial and error basis. The state of the art was quite common among all airplane manufacturers of that time. In most cases, Japanese flight instruments were replaced by US instruments for those aircraft intended for flight, but engine instruments were retained as they were calibrated for the function they served. US radio equipment and a new oxygen system also replaced Japanese types.

Captain William O Farrior became the first pilot to fly the earliest version of a rebuilt Hamp at Eagle Farm. The intended pilot was killed in a crash the same day, and Farrior was borrowed from a small group of 81st Air Depot test pilots and was to become well known for flying the early Japanese aircraft rebuilt at Eagle Farm. He later moved to Anacostia with the ATAIU and remained with intelligence his entire Air Force career. He first flew the Hamp over Brisbane for 30 minutes with the help of a captured Japanese pilot on 20 July 1943. An Allied aircraft always flew escort during tests of Japanese aircraft at Eagle Farm, and the Japanese aircraft were painted with their insignia to facilitate recognition photography. The Hamp (Zeke 32) was the first Japanese aircraft to be flown in simulated combat against top Allied fighter pilots.

Also flown at Eagle Farm were an Oscar Mk1 Nakajima Ki-43, first flown 17–18 March 1943, and later an Oscar Mk11 was put back in the air circa 4 July 1944. Another Oscar MK11 was flown to Eagle Farm from Hollandia circa July 1944. The Allies had captured the airfields at Hollandia on the northern coast of Dutch New Guinea circa June 1944. The Oscar was the workhorse of the Japanese Army.

A Tony, serialled by the ATAIU as XJ003, was also flown at Eagle Farm between 29 September and 7 October 1944. XJ was an acronym for Experimental Japanese Aircraft. The Tony was developed to use the licence-built Daimler Benz 601 inverted V12 liquid-cooled engine of the German Messerschmitt 109. The engine proved unreliable with the Japanese armed forces, suffering from continuing lubricating problems.

Bombers were also assembled at Eagle Farm, including a Betty land based bomber and a Sonia light bomber, however these were never flown.

The ATAIU were ordered back to the US in June 1944 to set up base at Hangar 151, Anacostia Naval Air Station at Washington, D.C, but the shift must have taken some months. During their service in Australia, the ATAIU had not encountered new Japanese aircraft that had been expected to be introduced, but rather improved versions of existing aircraft. The decision was made to consolidate all ATAIU activities, captured Japanese documents and nameplate analysis closer to the Pentagon. The unit travelled by Victory Ship to San Francisco then by a private train to Washington. They retained an intelligence gathering capability in the war zone, with field ATAI units in the SWPA, Pacific Ocean Area, Southeast Asia, China and India. Field ATAI units were headed by a trained officer and included aviation mechanics, photographers, radiomen, ordnancemen, and often translators.

When the war ended, so did the emphasis for further evaluation of these aircraft. In time, most of the aircraft were bulldozed, with a few being retained for museums.

=== Post Second World War Developments at Eagle Farm ===
The war brought about major changes in the roles of the three airfields in the Brisbane area. Eagle Farm became established as Brisbane Airport for all international and major domestic aviation services due to its location close to the City and the Port of Brisbane. Archerfield receded into a secondary role as a commuter airport and freight transport centre, and Amberley evolved as the major military base for the RAAF.

In January 1946 the Department of Air advised its post war requirements of Eagle Farm with the Department of Civil Aviation. In July 1947, the former US Army assets at Eagle Farm were transferred to the Department of Civil Aviation at a cost of £100,000. These included buildings 1,4,14,17, hangars 1,2,3,3A,4,5,6,7 and 8, as well as the SW-NE runway, the SE-NW runway and the WSW-ENE runway.

In December 1947, Eagle Farm was in the possession of the Department of Civil Aviation. Originally, the land had been acquired in the Department's name, but further areas were acquired through funds by the Department of Air. In April 1948, through the Commonwealth Disposals Commission, the Department of Civil Aviation took control of various assets erected for the RAAF at Eagle Farm from the Department of Air. In May 1949, the transfer took place of buildings, contents, equipment and services from the Commonwealth to the Department of Civil Aviation for £301,318. Hangar 7 was described as being 104 by 240 feet (32 m × 73 m) with frame timber trusses, weatherboard end walls, 23 pairs of eight pane clear glass casements, and 72 reinforced obscure glass skylights.

On 17 September 1947 hangar 7 was leased to Trans Australian Airlines as a cargo handling warehouse. On 21 October 1947 the insurance valuation of the igloo hangar with 24 feet (7.3 m) of hard standing either side and 60 feet (18 m) onto the apron was estimated to be £3700.

Hangar 8 was foreshortened and added to by the transfer of a saw-tooth roof steel trussed hangar from Archerfield in 1948. Drawings dated July 1947 show the dismantling of the western end of the hangar, with the western end being reassembled at the eastern end and an ex-Archerfield hangar No.25 added to the western end. The plan also shows the sites of future hangars 9 and 10.

In June 1949, alterations to hangar 7 and 10 (not yet built) for Qantas were estimated to cost £21,527. Work to hangar 7 consisted of the construction of; a cafeteria (later lunchroom) and kitchen; male and female locker rooms and toilets; personnel officers and first aid room; welding shop, upholstery shop, dope shop and engineers school; partition walls; new external walls to half way line along each side in asbestos cement sheeting and corrugated iron roof with sashes doors; a lean-to addition on the western end and provision of showers and wc's; installation of new skylights and rotator vents in the roof; installation of cold room; check and repair trusses; installation of light and power to workshop section, engineering school and kitchen (electrical work); drainage (civil engineering); and mechanical services. Total cost was estimated to be £11,769.0.0. A covered walkway was also proposed to link hangar 10 which was being built adjacent to the west, and the western aircraft doorway was enclosed.

Expenditure for the works was approved by the Minister for Civil Aviation in October 1949. The whole of the Qantas Empire Airways Douglas DC3 fleet servicing and maintenance, and certificates of air worthiness, were being carried out in Brisbane. Because of the congestion at Archerfield, Qantas was obliged to occupy Hangar 10 with a lack of facilities or security. In November 1949, Qantas were occupying the western end of hangar 7 adjoining hangar 10. The majority of the work to the two hangars was completed c. 1952.

Following Qantas' relocation to the International Terminal in 1975, Trans Australia Airlines took over the entire hangar as their air cargo facility. Further internal and external alterations included administration offices to the southwest, and steel framed skillion roofed extension to the north. Eagle Farm served as Brisbane Airport until 1988 with the commissioning of a new complex 5 kilometres (3.1 mi) to the northeast, at which time most major wartime structures were extant. With the opening of the new Domestic Terminal in 1988, the hangar 7 was vacated by Australian Airlines. Since 1991, hangar 7 has been used for warehousing purposes.

The hangars at eagle Farm have been used for airline terminal buildings, baggage handling facilities and amenities facilities.

== Description ==
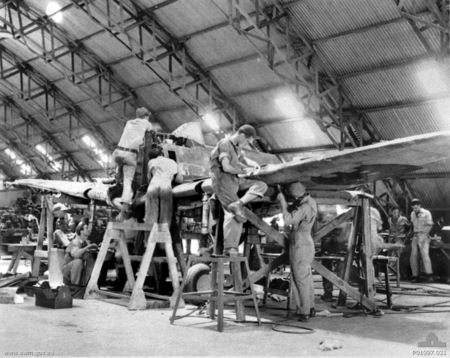
Interior view

The Second World War Hangar No.7, located fronting Terminal Drive to the south on the site of the old Brisbane Airport, is a timber truss igloo structure with ribbed sheet metal cladding. The structure is the last surviving Second World War timber truss igloo hangar at Eagle Farm.

The igloo is a form of light nailed hardwood timber arch construction, where each arch is made up of two half arches more or less freely pinned at two abutments close to ground level and at a central or crown pin. Each half arch consists of two adjacent trusses laced together at top and bottom chord level and each truss consists of a top and bottom chord laced together in arch form. As a result, each half truss is made up of four main timber chords sprung into arch form, and light timber bracing nailed in position to form a curved open-latticed box truss.

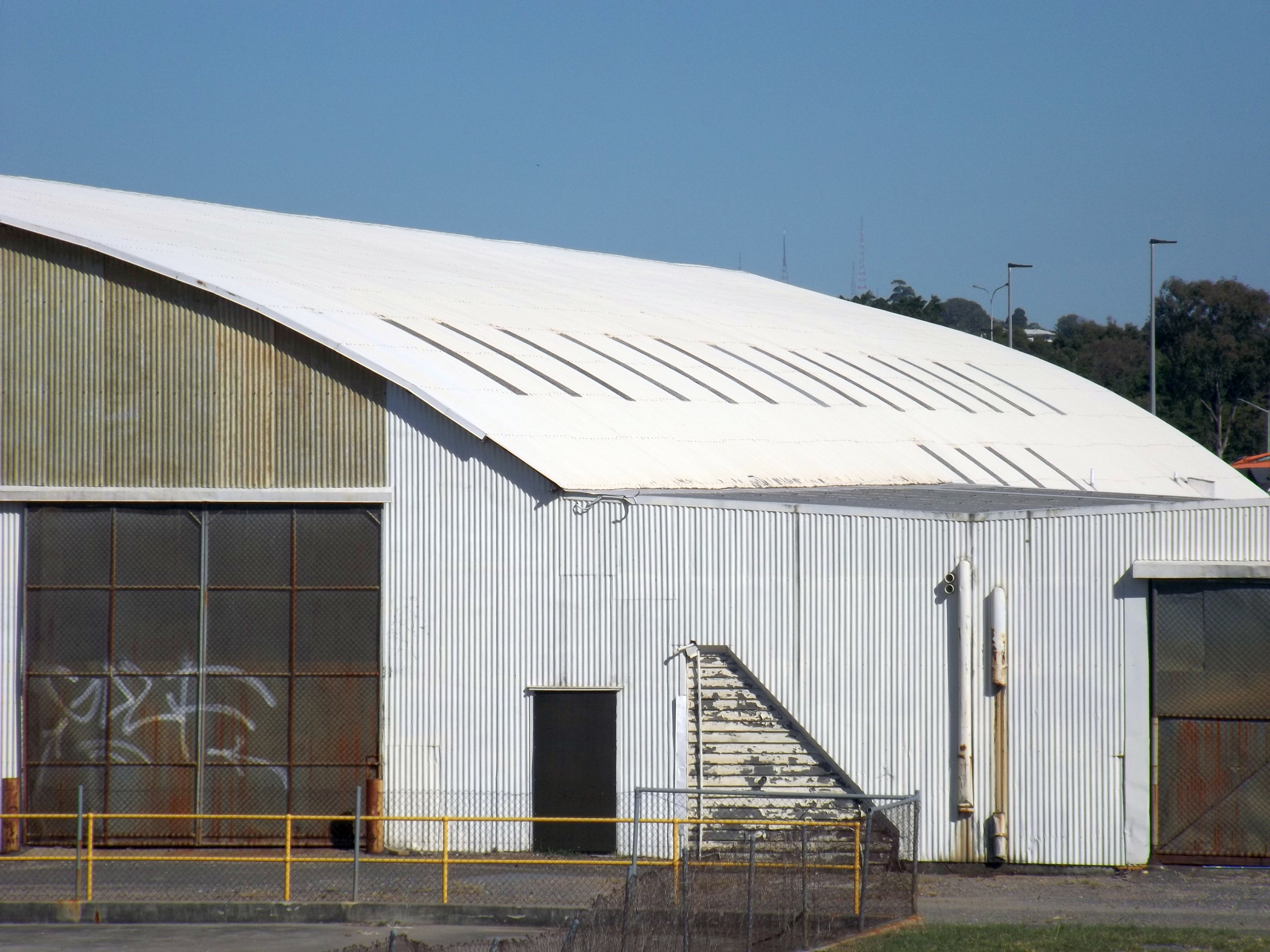
The roof in 2015

Hangar 7 faces east-west, and skillion roof additions have been added along the southern and northern sides. The southern side forms the main entry, and consists of a long skillion roof addition along most of this elevation, housing office accommodation, with ribbed metal wall cladding and metal framed glazing. A higher skillion at the eastern end of this elevation houses five metal doors for freight access.

The eastern end has ribbed metal wall cladding and two large metal doors for freight access surmounted by translucent ribbed sheeting. Sections of weatherboard cladding remain at the southeast corner. The northern side has a large steel framed skillion roofed addition with ribbed metal wall cladding, with storage at the northwest end and amenities at the western end.

The western end has weatherboard cladding with a single large doorway for freight access. This end originally faced the runway apron (straight six) and consisted of a central wide doorway with folding doors and high-level glazing. The high level glazing now has aluminium louvred infill, and a covered walkway linking the adjacent hangar 10 is used for covered car parking.

Internally, the building has a concrete floor throughout and exposed unpainted timber truss arches. Sections of the roof have translucent sheeting for light, and the eastern end is supported by scaffolding. The single-storeyed office accommodation along the southwest projects into the space, and is constructed in hardboard sheeting and is surmounted by air handling equipment. The hangar is currently used for freight storage.

Hangar 7 is surrounded by bitumen surfaces, with car parking to the south fronting Terminal Drive, and container storage areas to the north.

== Heritage listing ==
Second World War Hangar No. 7 was listed on the Queensland Heritage Register on 7 February 2005 having satisfied the following criteria.

The place is important in demonstrating the evolution or pattern of Queensland's history.

The Second World War Hangar No.7 was constructed in 1942 to house the work of the Allied Technical Air Intelligence Unit which involved the technical examination, reconstruction and simulated combat trials of captured Japanese aircraft. The ATAIU was formed to collect technical information on aircraft with which to develop combat techniques to counter the Japanese, and their work was integral to the Allied victory in the South West Pacific Area. The development of hangar 7 for the ATAIU, and of Eagle Farm as an aircraft assembly depot and aerodrome, is a result of a shift in Australian foreign policy in December 1941, when Prime Minister Curtin announced that Australia now looked to America free of the United Kingdom to shape a plan with the United States as its cornerstone. As a result, the RAAF was placed under the control of General Douglas MacArthur in April 1942. This contrasts with the previous role of Eagle Farm as part of an RAAF Elementary Flying Training School from 1940 which serviced the Empire Air Training Scheme to provide airmen for the defence of Britain. The hangar is representative of the massive wartime infrastructure constructed at and around Eagle Farm, the existence of which resulted in the Eagle Farm aircraft assembly depot and aerodrome becoming the Brisbane Airport after the Second World War.

The place demonstrates rare, uncommon or endangered aspects of Queensland's cultural heritage.

The hangar is the last surviving of its type at Eagle Farm, and is one of the few extant Second World War structures which demonstrate the site's former role as a major aircraft assembly depot and aerodrome, and the contribution of that function to the defence of the South West Pacific Area.

The place is important in demonstrating the principal characteristics of a particular class of cultural places.

The hangar is an example of a timber truss igloo structure and represents an advancement in timber technology achieved during the Second World War, which enabled long span lightweight structures utilising hand nailed timber in small sectional chord sizes to be erected quickly and at low cost.

The place is important because of its aesthetic significance.

The hangar is substantially intact internally, and through its form, scale and materials, makes an aesthetic contribution to the surrounding industrial landscape.

The place is important in demonstrating a high degree of creative or technical achievement at a particular period.

The hangar is an example of a timber truss igloo structure and represents an advancement in timber technology achieved during the Second World War, which enabled long span lightweight structures utilising hand nailed timber in small sectional chord sizes to be erected quickly and at low cost.

The place has a special association with the life or work of a particular person, group or organisation of importance in Queensland's history.

The hangar has been associated with the development of the Brisbane Airport until 1988, especially as a facility for Qantas who have been associated with Eagle Farm from 1926.
