= Whinstanes railway station =

Former railway station in Brisbane, Queensland, Australia

Whinstanes

General information
- Coordinates: 27°25′54″S 153°04′38″E
- Owner: Queensland Rail
- Line: Pinkenba line
- Platforms: 1 total (single platform)
Location

Whinstanes railway station is a former railway station on the Pinkenba railway line in Brisbane, Australia. It was opened in 1897 and, in 1921, became the junction for a branch line constructed to serve wharves at Hamilton. It was only 700 m east of Doomben railway station.

The station was closed in 1976 and was merged with Doomben, due to the expense of constructing higher-level platforms at two closely adjacent stations. For a time, the new station was known as Whinstanes-Doomben, but the "Whinstanes" part of the name was dropped in 1988, after the electrification of the line .
