= Allison Engine Testing Stands =

Allison Testing Stands
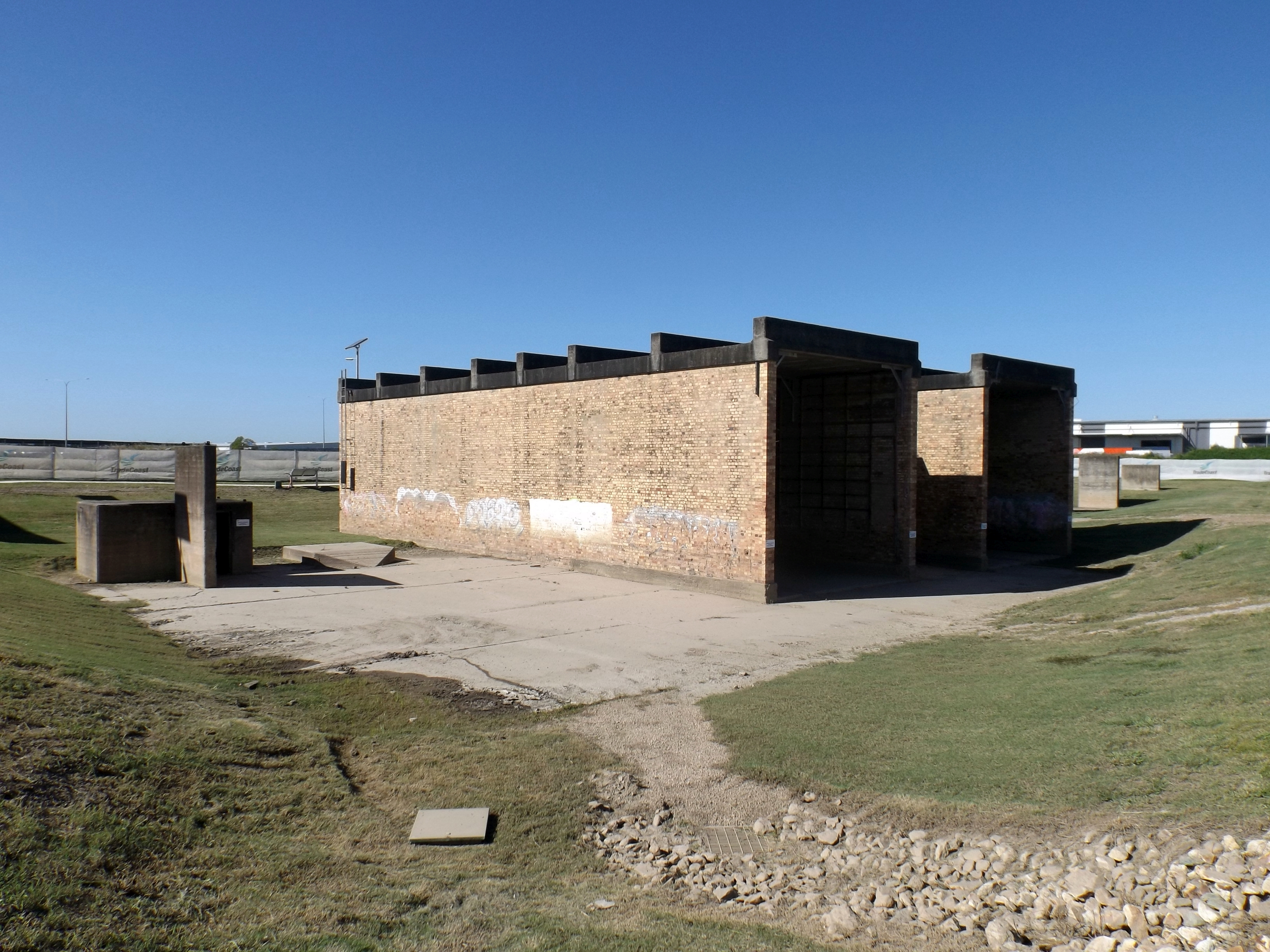
- Site in 2015

- Location within Queensland Location within Australia
- 27.4255°S 153.0898°E
- Location: adjacent to 71 Amy Johnson Place, Eagle Farm, City of Brisbane, Queensland, Australia

History
- Design period: 1939–1945 (World War II)
- Built: c. 1942

Queensland Heritage Register
- Official name: Allison Testing Stands (former)
- Type: state heritage (built)
- Designated: 5 August 2003
- Reference no.: 602329
- Significant period: 1942–43 (fabric); 1942–1944 (historical)
- Builders: USAAF 81st Air Depot Group, Allied Works Council

Allison Testing Stands is a heritage-listed engine test stand adjacent to 71 Amy Johnson Place, Eagle Farm, City of Brisbane, Queensland, Australia. It was built c. 1942 by USAAF 81st Air Depot Group and the Allied Works Council. It was added to the Queensland Heritage Register on 5 August 2003.

== History ==
The former Allison Testing Stands was an aero engine testing facility constructed in three stages during 1942–43 for the purpose of static testing of engines from the General Motors-Holden's Ltd overhaul plant at Breakfast Creek, Brisbane. Simple and functional in design, the site encompasses six open stands constructed by servicemen of the 44th Depot Repair Squadron of the USAAF 81st Air Depot Group; two enclosed engine stands constructed by the Allied Works Council; two open stands of unknown construction; and a concrete pavement area which is the site of former associated buildings.

The first Allison Testing Stands were constructed on the eastern side of Schneider Road and the Eagle Farm Aerodrome in November–December 1942 as a consequence of arrangements made for Australia to serve as a stronghold for United States (US) operations in the Pacific during World War II (WWII). The area, however, had previous links with aviation.

=== The original Eagle Farm Aerodrome ===
The original Eagle Farm Aerodrome, west of Schneider Road, was established by the Civil Aviation Branch of the Department of Defence in 1922 as the civilian landing ground for the city of Brisbane. Prior to this the 34-hectare (84-acre) site had been used for dairying by previous owners, David Wilson and William Lynn. Other dairy farms continued to operate nearby, most significantly that on the eastern side of Schneider Road on sub A allotment 4 portion 3, Parish of Toombul, County of Stanley which from 1922 was owned by George Franklin.

To foster the development of civil aviation at Eagle Farm the Civil Aviation Branch constructed a government hangar (1924) and a caretaker's cottage (1925). In 1927, in its first expansive step away from Longreach, Queensland, Qantas erected a hangar and commenced operations there of the Brisbane Flying School. By late 1930 Queensland Air Navigation Ltd operated scheduled services north to Townsville from Eagle Farm Aerodrome, while Australian National Airways Ltd flew passengers south to Sydney.

=== Archerfield Aerodrome ===
The effects of years of above-average rainfall on the low-lying estuarine land forced the Civil Aviation Branch in 1928 to establish an alternate site where future expansion would not be restricted. In 1931 Archerfield Aerodrome, to the south of the city, was designated Brisbane's aerodrome. Both the government and QANTAS hangars were reconstructed there that year. The Eagle Farm site reverted to grazing land leased by Margaret Wilson and David Campbell. By arrangement, on weekends members of the Brisbane Gliding Club conducted flights using a winch launch.

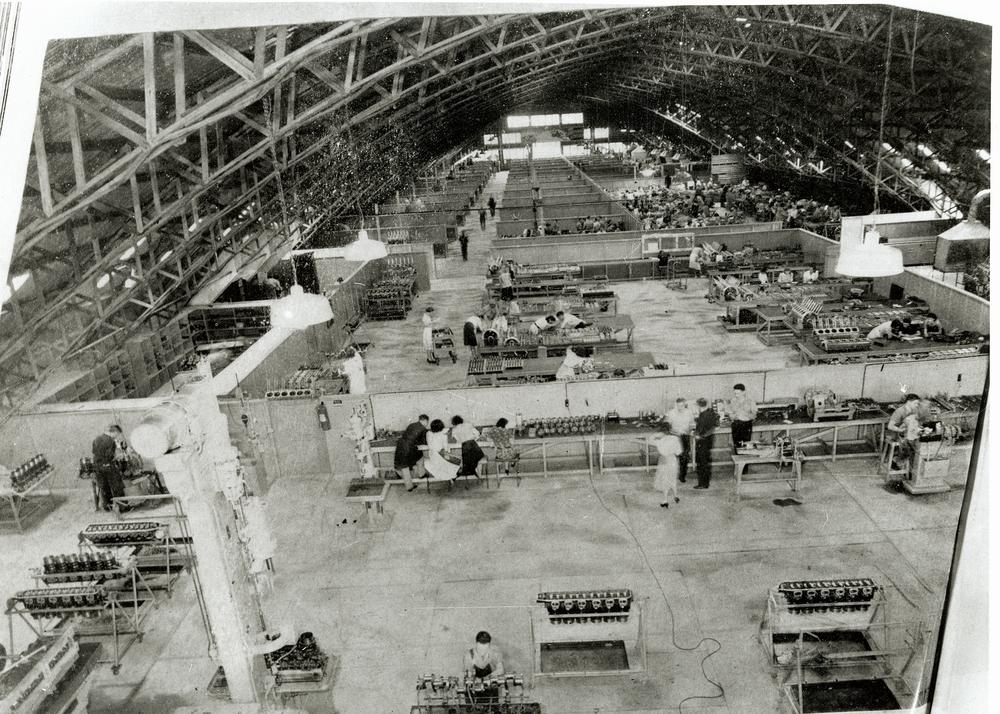
Interior view of GMH Allison Overhaul Assembly Plant during World War Two

Not until the first half of 1940 was the Eagle Farm site reconsidered as a landing ground for powered aircraft. It served as a relief landing ground for pilots from the Royal Australian Air Force's (RAAF) No. 2 Empire Flying Training School based at Archerfield Aerodrome until late 1941.

=== Eagle Farm as an Air Force aerodrome ===
The attack on Pearl Harbor on 7 December 1941 hastened the strategic role Australia played in providing the bases and armaments needed to fight the war in the Pacific. Well placed to the south of battle lines and with resources of labour that could be allocated to the purpose, Brisbane played a primary role. At Archerfield companies such as Aircraft Pty Ltd, Australian National Airways Pty Ltd, and QANTAS commenced the repair and maintenance of aircraft, including engine overhaul, for the United States Army Air Forces (USAAF).

From mid-January 1942 an Aircraft Erection Depot was established for the USAAF on the Eagle Farm aerodrome site. Constructed at an eventual cost of over £250,000, it served initially as an aerodrome where aircraft shipped to Australia could be reassembled. Later, captured enemy aircraft were test-flown and assessed by the Allied Technical Air Intelligence Unit based in Second World War Hangar No. 7.

The Queensland Main Roads Commission and its contractors extended the original Eagle Farm aerodrome to accommodate three runways and eight hangars. Such was the pressing need for these facilities that, where necessary, American service personnel participated in the construction.

=== Repair and maintenance of aircraft ===
The repair and maintenance of aircraft was another matter. From 1939, companies in other Australian states had been involved in manufacturing aircraft engines for the RAAF, notably the Gipsy Major engines for DH82 Tiger Moths and single-row Wasp radial engines for the Wirraway fighter. From the beginning of 1942, as part of the general gearing up of industry in Queensland, aviation companies commenced the overhaul of aircraft engine for the USAAF. Australian National Airways Pty Ltd at Archerfield Aerodrome produced its first two reconditioned radial engines in May 1942. Initially their mobile engine testing facility, consisting of an engine mount framework and control cabin on the chassis of a truck, was sufficient.

=== The Allison Engine ===
The Allison engine was, however, an in-line, liquid-cooled, V12 engine. The Allison company operated in the United States from the 1920s. In 1935 it was taken over by General Motors. To overhaul the numbers of Allison in-line engines needed for aircraft such as the Kittyhawk fighter, the Australian subsidiary of this company, General Motors-Holden's Ltd, was contracted in the latter half of 1942 to establish an overhaul and assembly plant in an igloo warehouse at Breakfast Creek. At its peak, this dedicated facility was capable of overhauling ten engines per day. Initially 180 men and women were employed. The site later doubled in size and approximately 530 workers were employed there. As in the other aircraft repair workshop, many were women who had had no previous experience with aircraft components.

From a monthly output of three engines in December 1942, the Breakfast Creek plant increased to a peak of 116 engines per month in April 1943. Subsidiary contractors such as the Toowoomba Foundry were involved in the re-boring of engine block components.

All reconditioned engines had to be tested. Supplied by the USAAF for this purpose were field units believed to be of the "Jacobsen" brand. Each comprised one fully equipped control cabin and two barrel type engine stands on four circular legs. Above the control cabin were the reservoirs of fuel and oil needed to "run-in" and test the new engines. Inside the control cabin an operative monitored a series of instruments, keeping a log of temperatures and pressures as each unit was brought gradually up to maximum rpm and run at this "red-line" speed for five minutes. The test schedule for each engine involved up to an hour to set up, then several hours to test-run and de-rig.

=== Extension of Eagle Farm Aerodrome ===
From June 1942 Commonwealth representatives processed the compulsory acquisition of land encompassed by the first extension to Eagle Farm Aerodrome. Included was the dairy on sub A allotment 4 portion 3 on the eastern side of Schneider Road operated in 1942 by Clara M. Franklin and her son. Here the fixed testing stands for the planned output of Allison engines were constructed. All buildings, other than the original farmhouse, were demolished.

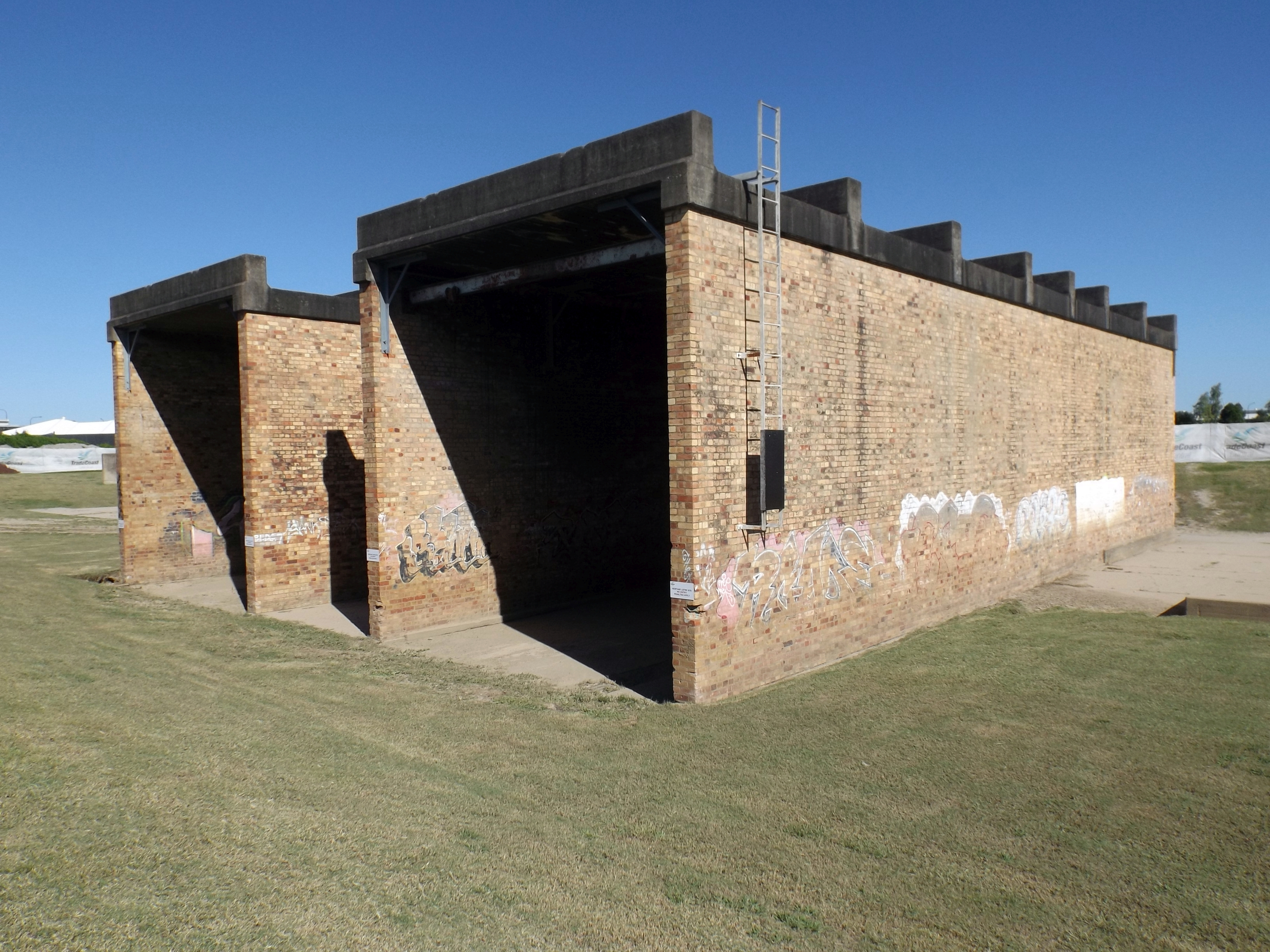
Enclosed stands, 2015

Members of the USAAF 81st Air Depot Group, a unit formed in May 1942 and based at Eagle Farm, erected the first six stands in October–November 1942. Around this time a system of connecting roadways were constructed around the stands and adjacent to the north, a hut. Only men were employed here in the round-the-clock shifts of Australian civilians and American servicemen. On 13 August 1943 a reporter for the Courier-Mail described the work as the "noisiest war job" (p4).

Complaints about the noise by Brisbane residents possibly influenced the design of the next two enclosed testing stands, plans for which were drawn up in March 1943. Including contingencies, their estimated cost was £12,254. As these two brick sound-proofed stands, a slab for a warehouse to the immediate north of the earlier hut, and the additional two open stands also erected in 1943 were to the north of the original row of six, more land was required.

For the purpose of this 1943 extension to the testing stands, resubdivisions 1–30 of sub C of allotment 4 of portion 3 of Parish of Toombul County of Stanley initially were hired through the RAAF. Not all the land was needed though. Resubdivisions 1–6, upon which most of the extension's buildings were constructed, belonged to Christopher Gills.

=== New testing facility at Rocklea ===
Also influencing the construction of this extension was a May 1943 request by General Douglas MacArthur for an engine overhaul capacity within Australia of 1,950 engines per month, 600 per month of which would be Allison engines. To cope with these projected numbers, several buildings within the former Rocklea Munitions Works were converted for aircraft engine overhaul.

Such a large output required a new testing facility, planned for construction in a Rocklea quarry. Originally 42 test cells with 21 control cabins were envisaged. It was hoped these especially designed brick structures would reduce the noise level of continuous testing to the point where it did not affect the health of operators, or be a nuisance to nearby residents. Following progressive downgrading of overhaul operations in Brisbane from July 1944, only eight of the Rocklea engine test cells were completed.

=== Downgrade of Air Force requirements ===
Priorities changed as the Pacific war moved further away from Australia. Fewer aircraft engines were overhauled in Brisbane. The departure for New Guinea in April 1944 of the 81st Air Depot Group added impetus to the discontinuation of operations. The field units of control cabins and engines stands were removed. The permanent testing stands at Eagle Farm were described as not having been in use for some months by late December 1944.

=== Return of Eagle Farm to civilian use ===
When the Eagle Farm airfield was returned to civilian use after the war, the Allison Testing Stands were simply left standing. Aerials and historic photos indicate that sometime between 1944 and 1946 the hut to the north of the stands was removed. Part of the northernmost enclosed testing stands was converted for storage with the installation of two concrete block walls. Aerial photographs from the period indicate that between 1974 and 1978 the warehouse was removed or demolished.

=== Change of use of Eagle Farm Aerodrome land ===
Eagle Farm airport was closed in 1988 when a new airport was constructed to the north. In 2002 the Brisbane City Council acquired the airport site from the Commonwealth. The land was transferred to TradeCoast Land Pty Ltd in 2005 and a master plan was prepared to guide its development as an office park and for warehousing. The testing stands along with Hangar No. 7 are now the only structures remaining from the use of the site as a major airfield during WWII.

== Description ==
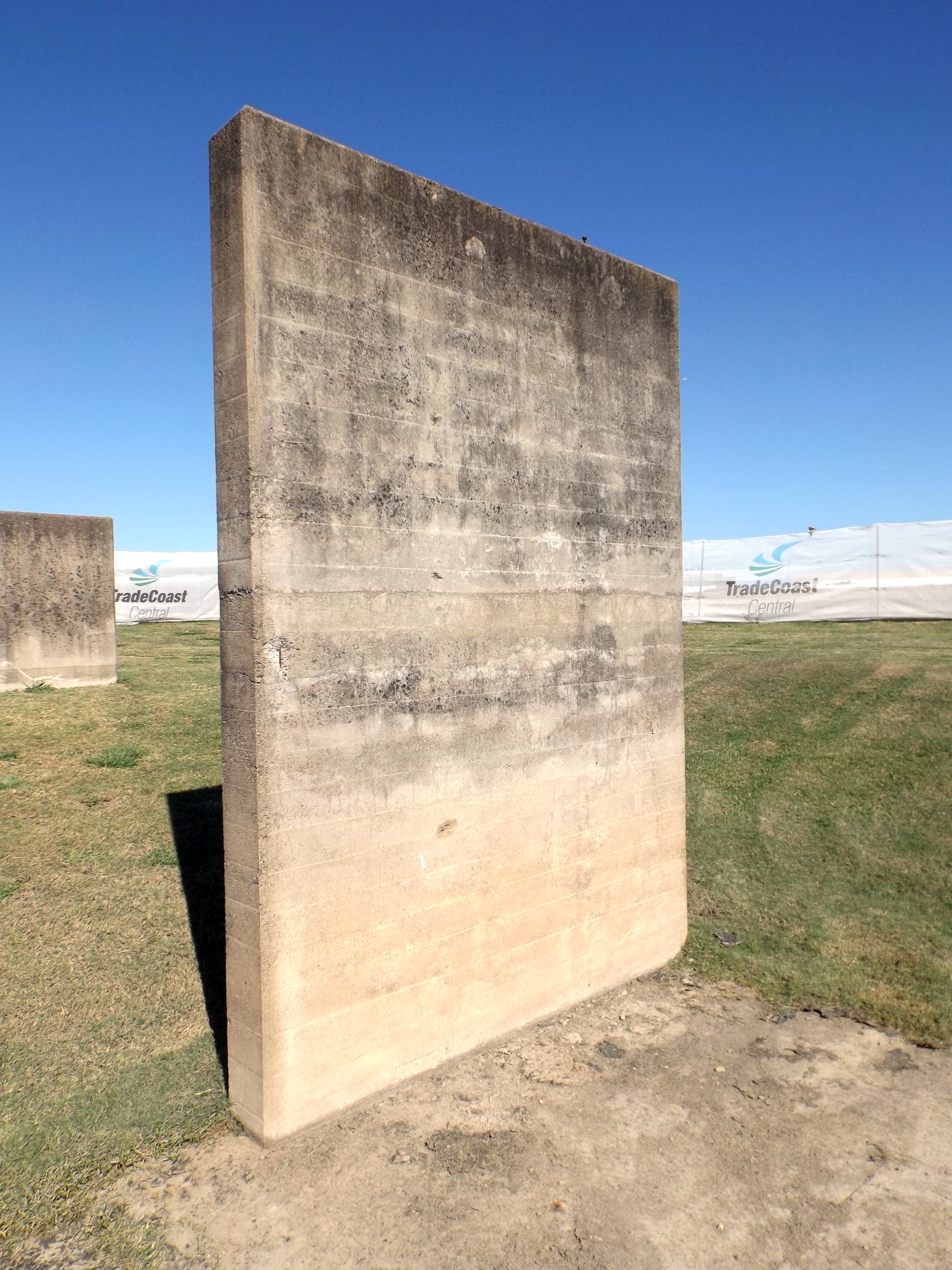
Concrete remains at the south end, 2015

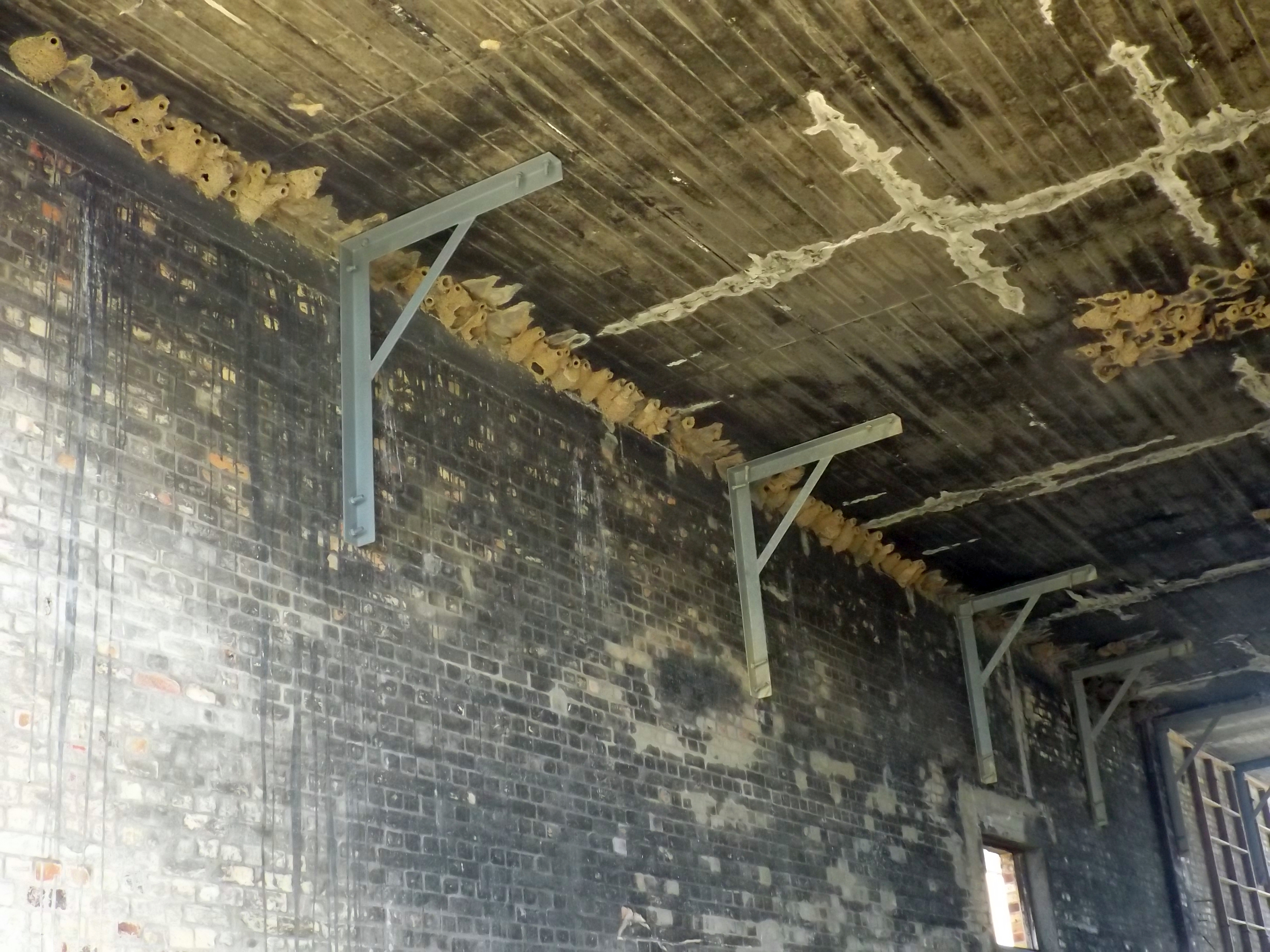
Enclosed stand's internal roof, 2015

The site comprises four sections, six open engine testing stands constructed in 1942, two enclosed testing stands constructed in 1943, two open stands constructed in 1943 and the concrete flooring and footings of a hut and warehouse. The chief characteristic of the site is the functional nature of the design of each section.

The most prominent features of the six open engine testing stands constructed in 1942 are the six reinforced concrete walls which separated the testing stands and provided a degree of protection against excessive noise or a propeller malfunction. Stands 1 to 4, numbered from the north, have been constructed on a raised concrete platform 40 centimetres (16 in) above ground level. Parts of its flooring have been raised higher above the general level of the platform. They indicate the positions where each engine stand and its respective control cabin would have stood.

Most of the remaining evidence of the purpose and working life of the site is on the platform. Of the monorail above each engine, only the vertical I-beams, cut off at their base, indicate where they were situated. Engines and propellers were manoeuvred into position using a block and tackle which ran along this monorail. Four steel circles set in the concrete, the legs of the barrel-type engine stands cut off at their base, show the engine stand position. What remains of the timber sleeper and bitumen floor along the frontal width of stands 1 to 4 delineates the position of the propeller arc. Drum caps, steel plates and pieces of cloth are embedded in the bitumen.

The two enclosed stands from 1943 have been constructed using brick walls set on a concrete foundation. The pattern of the 35-centimetre (14 in) thick walls is a variation of English bond. The roof of each is reinforced concrete and features eight vertical fins. The southern enclosed stand is open at both its eastern and western ends and has a concrete floor. Two doors and two windows open towards the central area in which a brick control cabin with a reinforced concrete roof is located.

The design and construction of the northern enclosed stand mirrors that of the southern one. The horizontal I-beam section of a monorail, rated for a maximum loading of 2 long tons (2.0 t), is positioned close to the ceiling at the eastern end of this stand.

Of the two walls built to protect workers in the two open testing stands constructed in 1943, only one remains standing. The control cabin that served both stands is built of concrete, while two distinct, raised platforms on each side of the control cabin, both with the circular footprints of the barrel-type stands, attest to the position of the test engines. Oil residue indicates the position of the propeller arc.

To the north-west of the enclosed test stands are the concrete footings of a hut constructed in 1942. Immediately north of this are the footings and concrete floor of a warehouse constructed in 1943. Both are surrounded by concrete pavement.

Most sections of the stands site have altered little since the fixtures used for engine testing were removed, however modern concrete block walls constructed to ceiling height in the northern enclosed testing stand have created a secure room occupying approximately one third of the structure.

== Heritage listing ==
Allison Testing Stands (former) was listed on the Queensland Heritage Register on 5 August 2003 having satisfied the following criteria.

The place is important in demonstrating the evolution or pattern of Queensland's history.

The Allison Testing Stands site is important in demonstrating the evolution or pattern of Queensland's history, in particular the period of rapid mobilization of available resources in Queensland in 1942–43 for the Pacific theatre of war during World War II.

The place demonstrates rare, uncommon or endangered aspects of Queensland's cultural heritage.

The site demonstrates rare aspects of Queensland's history. Until the mass overhaul of engines during World War II necessitated fixed testing sites, the task of engine testing was a mobile activity. Of the two fixed testing facilities constructed in Brisbane during the war, only this site, which incorporates three different designs of testing stand, has survived.

The place has a special association with the life or work of a particular person, group or organisation of importance in Queensland's history.

Because of its position in the aero engine overhaul process, the Allison Testing Stands site has a special association with the group of Queensland civilians whose labour for the Aircraft Production Commission contributed to the war effort. Most had no previous experience with the engineering aspects of aircraft engine overhaul.
