= Eagle Farm Airport =

Former airport of Brisbane, Queensland, Australia (1925–1988)

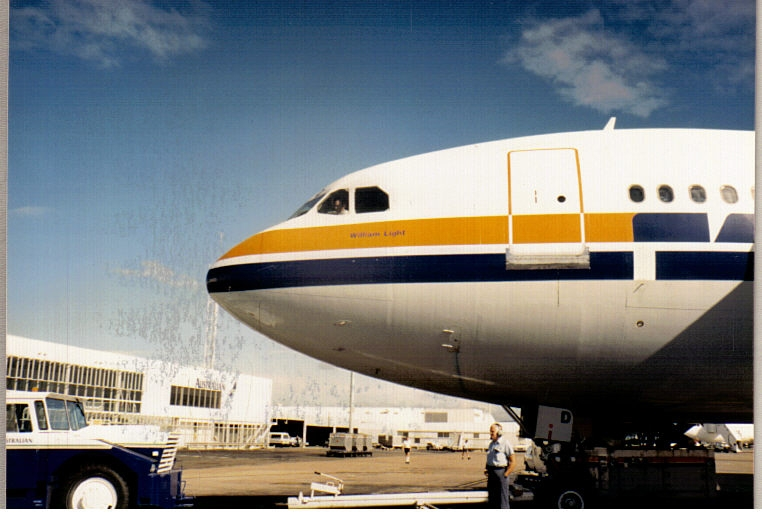
- Trans Australia Airlines Airbus A300 at Eagle Farm Airport in 1988
- IATA: ~~BNE~~; ICAO: ~~YBBN~~

Summary
- Airport type: Defunct
- Serves: Brisbane; South East Queensland
- Location: Eagle Farm, Queensland, Australia
- Opened: 1925
- Closed: 19 March 1988
- Coordinates: 27°25′30″S 153°05′03″E

Map
- Location in Queensland

Eagle Farm Airport (IATA: ~~BNE~~, ICAO: ~~YBBN~~) was an airport located 6 km (3.7 mi) north-east of Brisbane in the suburb of Eagle Farm, Queensland, Australia.

== History ==
An area located near Eagle Farm Racecourse was initially used as a landing field in 1922 and Eagle Farm Aerodrome was officially opened in 1925. It was used for scheduled flights between Brisbane and Queensland regional centres by Qantas, which operated from Eagle Farm in 1926 and formed the Brisbane Flying Training School there in 1927.

Charles Kingsford Smith, Charles Ulm, Harry Lyon (navigator) and James Warner (radio operator) landed the Southern Cross at Eagle Farm on 9 June 1928 after its trans-Pacific flight from Oakland, California. About 16,000 people greeted the Southern Cross upon its landing.

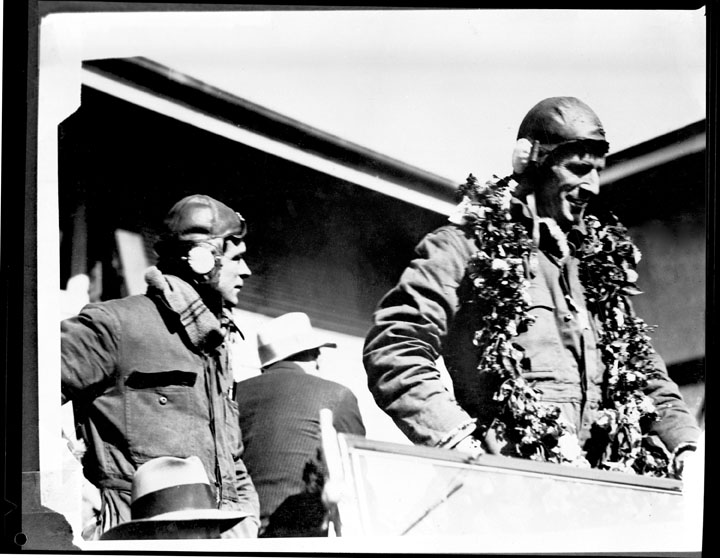
Charles Kingsford Smith and Charles Ulm after landing the Southern Cross, 9 June 1928

Australian National Airways (ANA) began an aerial service from Eagle Farm to Sydney, New South Wales, in 1930. Eagle Farm was closed 31 January 1931 after civil operations were relocated to Archerfield Airport. A number of hangars were relocated to Archerfield, and the QANTAS one still stands.

Sir Charles Kingsford Smith and Gordon Taylor took off from Eagle Farm airport on 20 October 1934 in the Lady Southern Cross attempting the first eastward trans-Pacific flight from Australia to the United States.

=== World War II ===
The aerodrome was compulsorily acquired and taken over by the Royal Australian Air Force on 8 March 1940. US forces built all the facilities at Eagle farm and built the drainage canals to deal with the swampy areas. It was not returned to Australian ownership until 31 January 1947, exactly sixteen years after the civilian closure, and was reopened for civil flights on 10 March 1947.

Eagle Farm was extended and reopened in January 1942, during World War II by the United States Army Air Forces (USAAF), due to the proximity to the Brisbane River. The aerodrome was used as a reassembly and test airfield for aircraft shipped from the United States.

A testing area was built at Eagle Farm to test Allison engines that had been assembled or overhauled at the GMH Allison Overhaul Assembly Plant at Albion, Queensland.

The Allied Technical Air Intelligence Unit (ATAIU) of the Allied Air Forces utilised Hangar No. 7 at Eagle Farm to test and to train in captured Imperial Japanese aircraft.

==== Allied Technical Air Intelligence Unit (ATAIU) ====
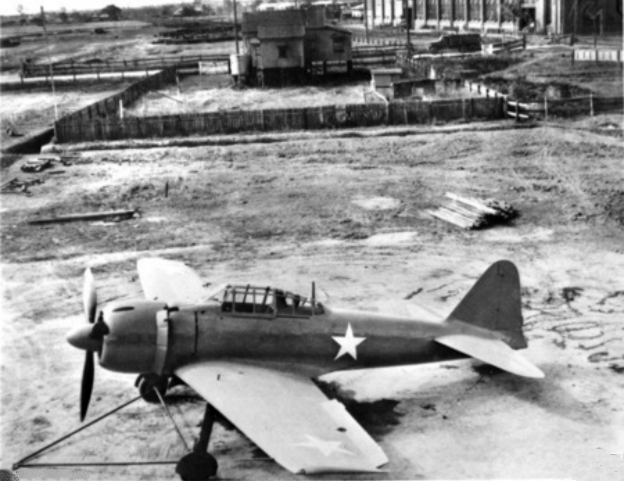
A captured Zero fighter at Eagle Farm in 1943

At the time of the Japanese bombing of Pearl Harbor and the outbreak of the Pacific War on 7 December 1941, Allied forces had virtually no knowledge of Japanese aircraft or their performance capabilities.

To sort out this dilemma became the responsibility of the Allied Technical Air Intelligence Unit (ATAIU) under the command of General MacArthur.

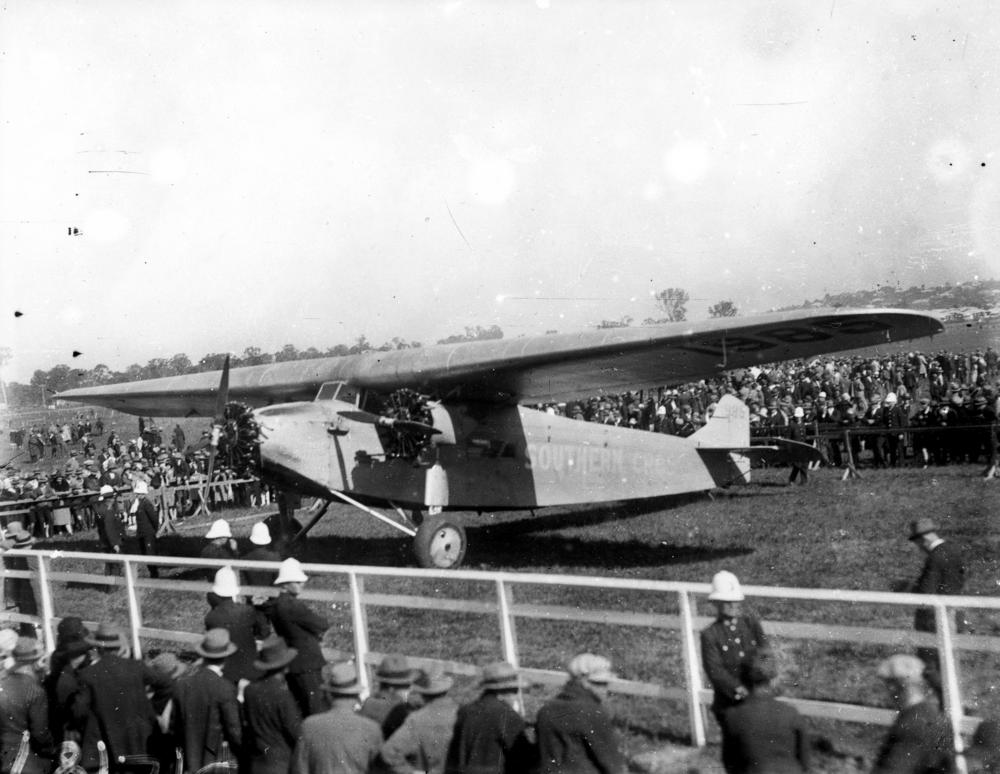
The "Southern Cross", a Fokker F.VII 3m aeroplane, on display, June 1928

The unit gathered crashed and captured Japanese planes, superior to anything in the Allied air forces, and rebuilt them to fly over Brisbane so engineers could develop new aircraft to match them. The Eagle Farm unit eventually rebuilt at least 30 aircraft. Japanese flight instruments were replaced by US instruments, engine instruments were retained and US radio equipment and oxygen system replaced the Japanese types.

Captain Frank T. McCoy Jr. and Technical Sergeant Francis 'Fran' Williams headed up a 'Materiel Section' to evaluate captured Japanese equipment. Williams suggested a series of simple code names. Japanese fighter aircraft were given male names, bombers were given female names and transport aircraft were given names starting with the letter T. The coding system became known as MacArthur Southwest Pacific Code Name System. McCoy's group became responsible for producing code names and associated silhouettes for aircraft identification.

McCoy, Williams and others initially used their own names for aircraft, then went to relatives and friends for more names. The bomber Louise was named after Frank McCoy's wife and June was named after his daughter. Flight Sergeant George Rimmington RAAF, was the ATAIU's technical illustrator. He produced silhouette drawings for aircraft recognition. His name George was used to identify the Kawanishi N1K-J Navy interceptor fighter.

On 9 October 1942, Lieutenant Clyde Gessel was assigned as the Enemy Equipment Engineer. In early 1943, he was notified Australian Infantry soldiers had encountered what appeared to be a new type of Japanese aircraft at Buna airfield in New Guinea. Gessel flew to Port Moresby to recover the aircraft and by 24 February 1943 the remains of five wrecked aircraft were used to build a single flyable 'Zeke 32', a variation of the Japanese Zero.

Captain William Farrior was the first to fly the rebuilt Zeke 32 at Eagle Farm, for 30 minutes, on 20 July 1943. To help produce identification photographs the Zero was painted in Japanese colours and flown around Brisbane with an escort. By 10 August 1943, ATAIU had flown the Zero six times.

Mock dogfights between the Zero and a Mk V Spitfire were carried out at Eagle Farm on 14, 17 and 18 August 1943. The Zero proved better than the Spitfire below 20,000 feet. Japanese planes were lighter, the Zeke 32 and the Oscar using a single piece wing rather than two wings attached at heavy wing root plates and the fuselages had holes drilled in the ribs to lighten them.

Three Nakajima Ki.43 Oscars were used to rebuild a single flyable Oscar, the Japanese work horse of the air. Its tail number XJ002 signified it was the second aircraft rebuilt at Hangar 7, while XJ denoted the status – Experimental Japanese.

==== Units based at Eagle Farm Aerodrome ====
- 8th Fighter Group, 6 March – 29 July 1942 P-39 Airacobra
- 35th Fighter Group, 1 February 1942 – March 1942 P-39 Airacobra, Curtiss P-40

Headquarters and the 70th Fighter Squadron sailed for Australia on 12 January 1942. Three days later all the combat squadrons were relieved and three others, still in the US, were assigned. Headquarters reached Australia in February 1942 and moved on to India.

- 3d Airdrome Squadron, 1942
- 81st Depot Repair Squadron, August 1942
- 93d Depot Repair Squadron
- 15th Weather Squadron, 1944
- 126th Signal Radio Intelligence Company (US Army), 23 March 1943 – July 1944
- 28th Photographic Reconnaissance Squadron, 1 February 1943 – 31 March 1944

=== Post war ===
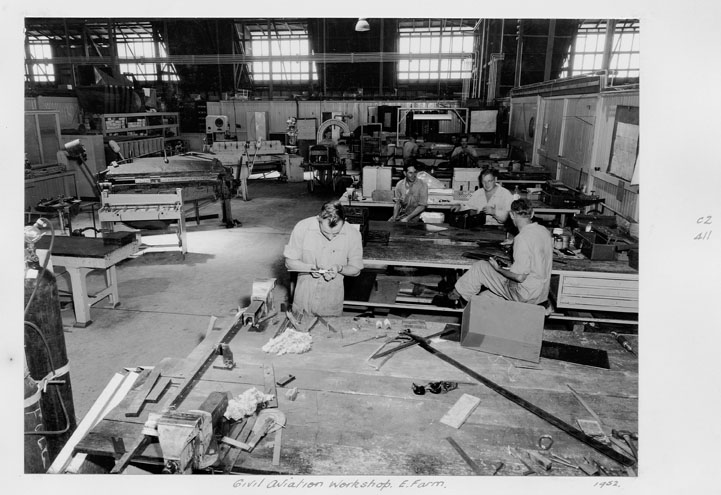
A civil aviation workshop at Eagle Farm Airport in 1952

After World War II, Ansett ANA and Trans Australia Airlines (TAA) moved their operations to Eagle Farm on 10 March 1947. Archerfield saw its last airliner operation on 29 May 1949. Both airlines used old USAAF igloos as terminals, and an international flights igloo was located between the two. In September 1971, the TAA igloo burnt down (suspected by many as deliberate) and TAA then operated from the international igloo until a new domestic terminal opened in 1975.

By the 1960s, it was clear that the facilities at Eagle Farm were inadequate for a city of Brisbane's size and anticipated growth. Many long-haul international services to Asia were required to make an en route stop (e.g., at Darwin), disadvantaging the city to lure prospective carriers and business opportunities.

As a result, the Federal Government announced the construction of a new airport to be built north of Eagle Farm. The Federal Government completed the first compulsory acquisition of nearby houses in 1969, and the process continued for another twelve years. The new airport was built by Leighton Contractors, and Brisbane Airport opened in 1988. Much of the old Eagle Farm Airport disappeared under the Gateway Motorway.

== Layout ==
Eagle Farm originally had three grass runways 04/22 5,985 feet (1,824 m), 07/25 6,985 feet (2,129 m) and 12/30 5,015 feet (1,529 m) which upgraded to concrete during World War 2. When reconstructed in 1947, runway 07/25 was decommissioned, 12/30 was renumbered to 13/31 and the two remaining runways were upgraded to asphalt, 04/22 extended to 2,365 m × 60 m (7,759 ft × 197 ft) and 13/31 to 1,539 m × 30 m (5,049 ft × 98 ft). The main runway had a full parallel taxiway; runway edge lighting was provided on all runways, T-VASIS lighting was provided on runways 04 and 22, and high intensity Calvert white precision approach lighting was provided on runway 22. Navigation aids were a VOR/DME beacon, a NDB, and an instrument landing system Category I on runway 22. 2,421,109 passengers used the airport in 1977.

The TAA and Ansett domestic terminals at Eagle Farm Airport were reached from Lamington Avenue, near the Doomben Racecourse. The main runway ran from there to the north-east, and its north-east end survives as taxiway Papa of the present airport. The international terminal was in the earlier years, on the same apron as the domestic terminals, but in 1975 a new terminal was built near the other end of the runway, and was used for the next twenty years. This terminal is now the cargo terminal.

== Accidents and incidents ==
A number of aircraft crashed at Eagle Farm during World War II.

- 25 November 1942 – Royal Netherlands East Indies Army Air Force, Curtiss-Wright CW-22 Falcon
- 14 January 1943 – USAAF, B-25C Mitchell, Serial Number #41-12438
- 28 March 1943 – USAAF, B-25C Mitchell, Serial Number #42-32314
- 23 April 1943 – USAAF, B-25C Mitchell, Serial Number #41-12496
- 12 July 1943 – USAAF, Curtiss-Wright CW-22B, Serial Number #65-3765
- 21 July 1943 – ATIU, captured A6M3 "Hamp"
- 18 September 1945 – USAAF, C-47A Dakota, Serial Number #42-23485

== See also ==
- United States Army Air Forces in Australia (World War II)
- List of airports in Queensland

== Bibliography ==
- OzatWar website
- Queensland Government Heritage Listing
- USAF Historical Research Agency Document Search
- USAF Historical Research Agency Document Search
- Maurer, Maurer (1983). Air Force Combat Units of World War II. Maxwell AFB, Alabama: Office of Air Force History. ISBN 0-89201-092-4.
- Maurer, Maurer, ed. (1982) [1969]. Combat Squadrons of the Air Force, World War II (PDF) (reprint ed.). Washington, DC: Office of Air Force History. ISBN 0-405-12194-6. LCCN 70605402. OCLC 72556. Archived from the original (PDF) on 20 December 2016.
- Prins, François (Winter 1993). "Brisbane's Heritage". Air Enthusiast. No. 52. pp. 26–27. ISSN 0143-5450.
