= 1836 =

1836 in various calendars
- Gregorian calendar: 1836; MDCCCXXXVI
- Ab urbe condita: 2589
- Armenian calendar: 1285; ԹՎ ՌՄՁԵ
- Assyrian calendar: 6586
- Balinese saka calendar: 1757–1758
- Bengali calendar: 1242–1243
- Berber calendar: 2786
- British Regnal year: 6 Will. 4 – 7 Will. 4
- Buddhist calendar: 2380
- Burmese calendar: 1198
- Byzantine calendar: 7344–7345
- Chinese calendar: 乙未年 (Wood Goat); 4533 or 4326 — to — 丙申年 (Fire Monkey); 4534 or 4327
- Coptic calendar: 1552–1553
- Discordian calendar: 3002
- Ethiopian calendar: 1828–1829
- Hebrew calendar: 5596–5597
- Hindu calendars
- Vikram Samvat: 1892–1893
- Shaka Samvat: 1757–1758
- Kali Yuga: 4936–4937
- Holocene calendar: 11836
- Igbo calendar: 836–837
- Iranian calendar: 1214–1215
- Islamic calendar: 1251–1252
- Japanese calendar: Tenpō 7 (天保７年)
- Javanese calendar: 1763–1764
- Julian calendar: Gregorian minus 12 days
- Korean calendar: 4169
- Minguo calendar: 76 before ROC 民前76年
- Nanakshahi calendar: 368
- Thai solar calendar: 2378–2379
- Tibetan calendar: ཤིང་མོ་ལུག་ལོ་ (female Wood-Sheep); 1962 or 1581 or 809 — to — མེ་ཕོ་སྤྲེ་ལོ་ (male Fire-Monkey); 1963 or 1582 or 810

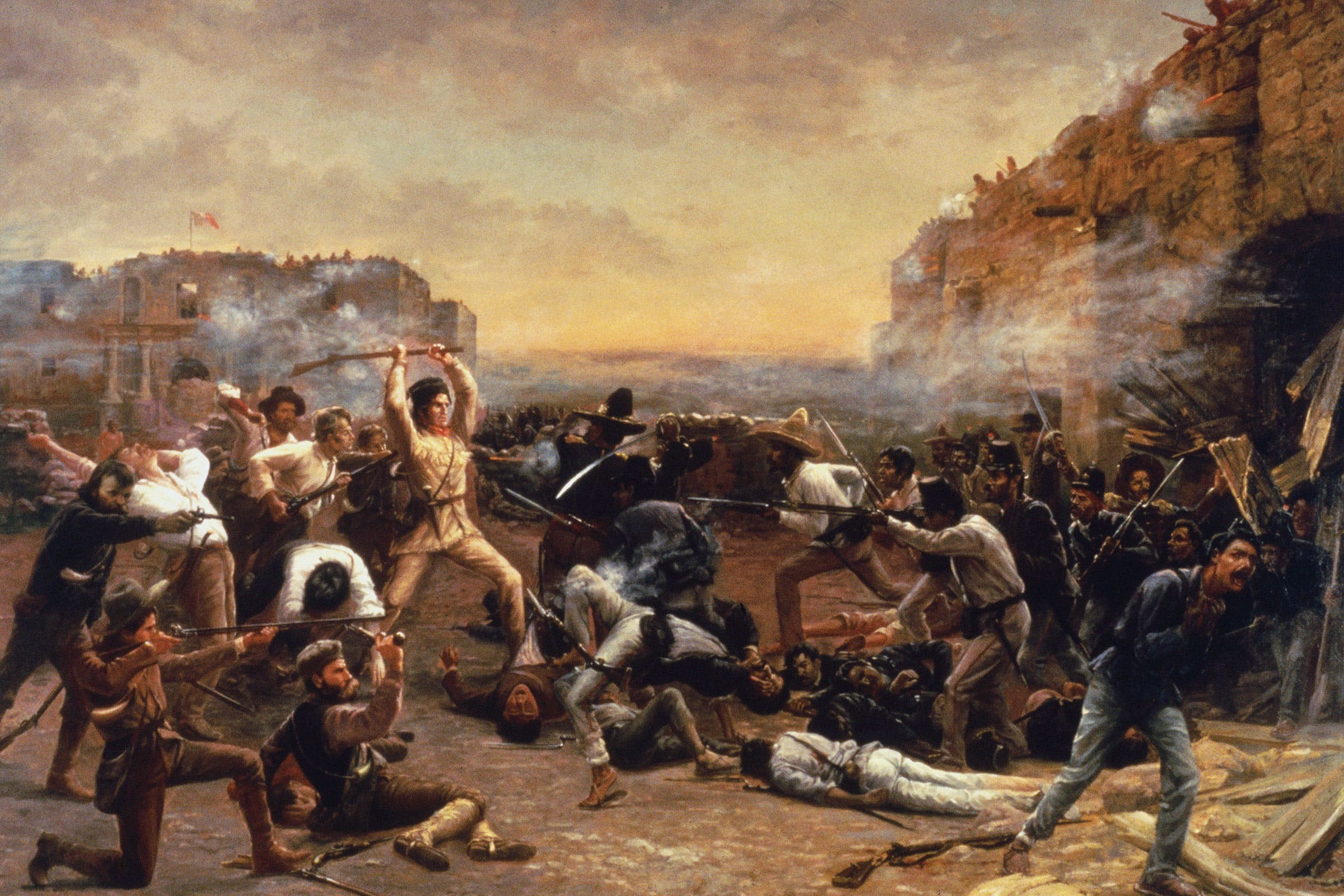
March 6: The 182 Texas defenders of the Alamo are killed while defending against 2,000 Mexican Army attackers

March 2: The Republic of Texas declares independence from Mexico.

1836 (MDCCCXXXVI) was a leap year starting on Friday of the Gregorian calendar and a leap year starting on Wednesday of the Julian calendar, the 1836th year of the Common Era (CE) and Anno Domini (AD) designations, the 836th year of the 2nd millennium, the 36th year of the 19th century, and the 7th year of the 1830s decade. As of the start of 1836, the Gregorian calendar was 12 days ahead of the Julian calendar, which remained in localized use until 1923.

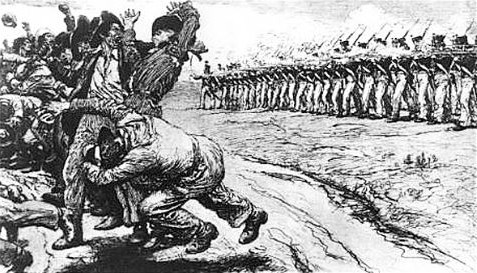
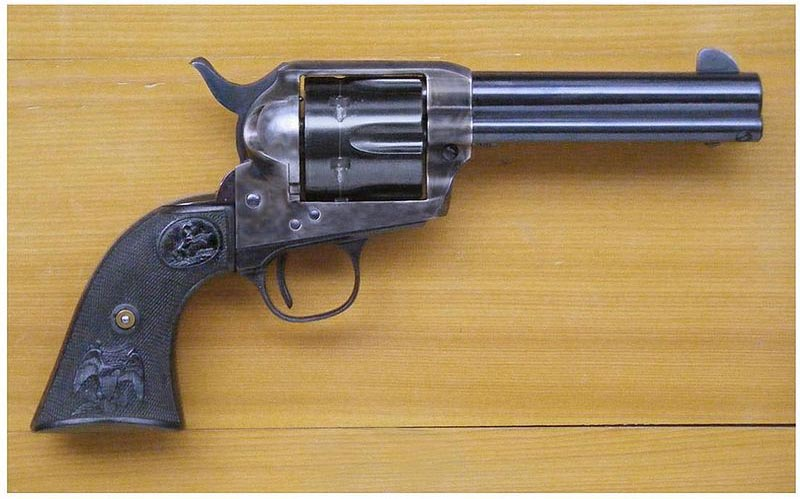
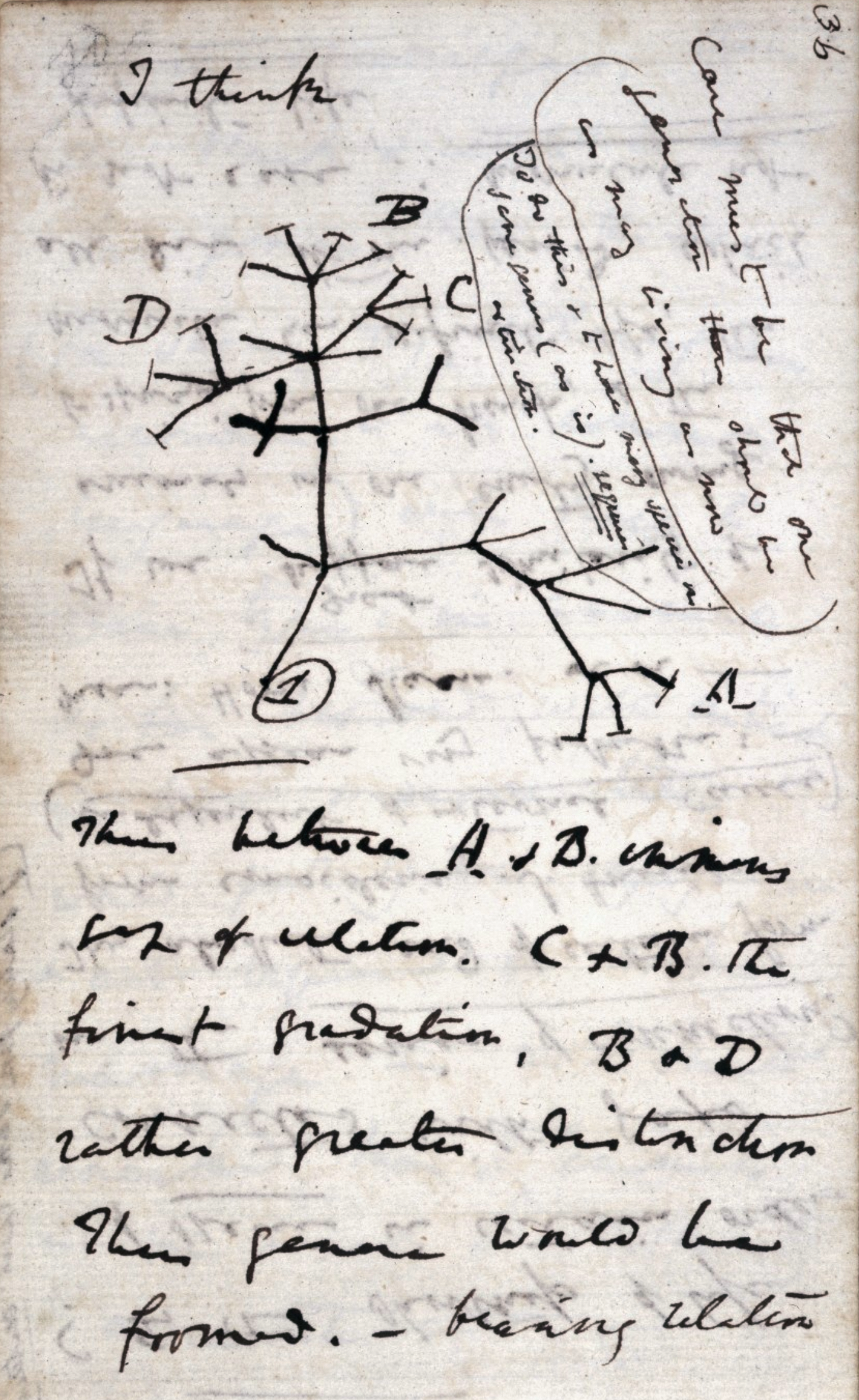
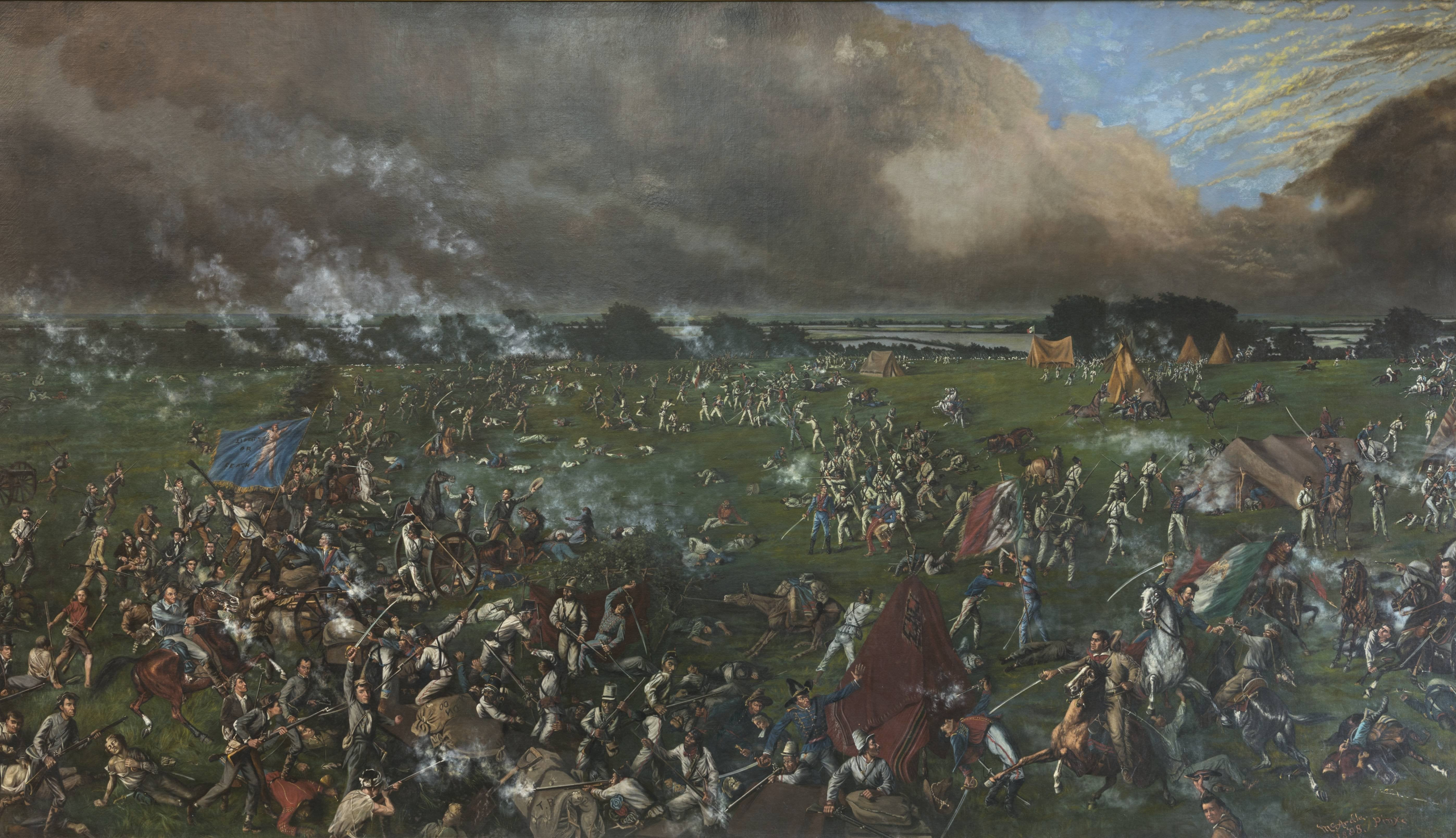
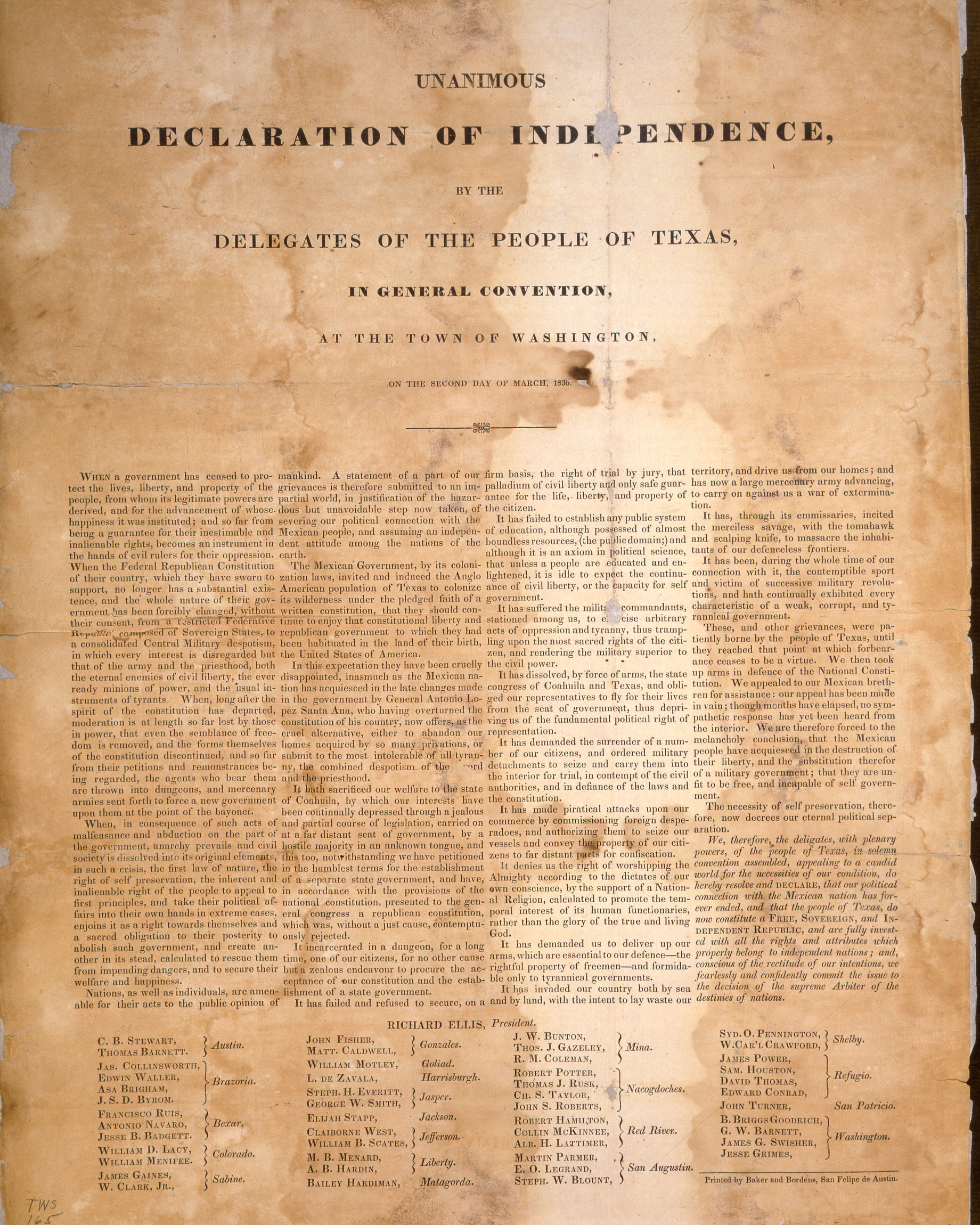
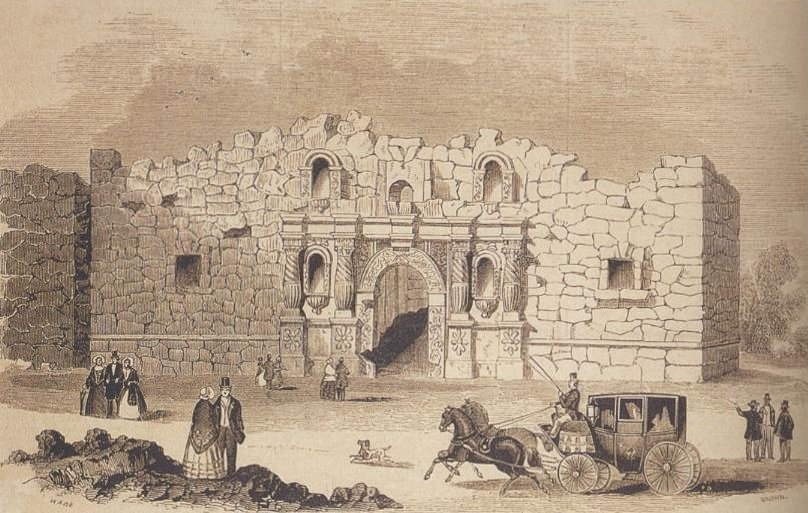
Clockwise from top left: Goliad massacre, Samuel Colt/ Colt revolver, Charles Darwin/ Theory of evolution, Arkansas, The Battle of San Jacinto, Texas Declaration of Independence from Mexico, The Battle of the Alamo.

== Events ==
=== January–March ===
- January 1 — Hill Street Academy is named Colombo Academy and acquired by the Government, establishing the first public school in Sri Lanka.
- January 1 – Queen Maria II of Portugal marries Prince Ferdinand Augustus Francis Anthony of Saxe-Coburg-Gotha.
- January 5 – Former U.S. Representative Davy Crockett of Tennessee arrives in Texas to join the Texan fight for independence from Mexico.
- January 12
  - HMS Beagle, with Charles Darwin on board, reaches Sydney.
  - Will County, Illinois, is formed.
- February 8 – London and Greenwich Railway opens its first section, the first railway in London, England.
- February 23 – Texas Revolution: The Battle of the Alamo begins, with an American settler army surrounded by the Mexican Army, under Santa Anna.
- February 25 – Samuel Colt receives a United States patent for the Colt revolver, the first revolving barrel multishot firearms.
- February 29 - Giacomo Meyerbeer's opera, Les Huguenots is performed for the first time in Paris, France.
- March 1 – Texas Revolution – Convention of 1836: Delegates from many Texas communities gather in Washington-on-the-Brazos, Texas, to deliberate independence from Mexico.
- March 2 – Texas Revolution – Convention of 1836: The Texas Declaration of Independence is signed by 60 delegates, and the Republic of Texas is declared.
- March 6 – Texas Revolution: The Battle of the Alamo ends. At least 182 Texan settler soldiers die in a struggle against more than 2,000 Mexican soldiers.
- March 11 – Sultan Mahmud II abolishes the posts of Reis ül-Küttab and Kahya Bey, and establishes the Ottoman ministries of Foreign Affairs and of the Interior in their place.
- March 17 – Texas Revolution – Convention of 1836: Delegates adopt the Constitution of the Republic of Texas, modeled after the United States Constitution. It allows slavery, requires free blacks to petition Congress to live in the country, but prohibits the slave trade.
- March 27
  - Texas Revolution – Goliad massacre: 342 Texan prisoners are shot and killed, along with Texan General James Walker Fannin, by Mexican troops in Goliad, near the Presidio La Bahía.
  - The United States Survey of the Coast is returned to the U.S. Treasury Department, and renamed the U.S. Coast Survey.
  - The Kirtland Temple, the first Mormon temple, is dedicated by Joseph Smith Jr. in Kirtland, Ohio.
- March 29 – Richard Wagner's opera Das Liebesverbot is performed for the first time, in Magdeburg.
- March 31 (dated April) – The first monthly part of Charles Dickens's The Pickwick Papers ("The Posthumous Papers of the Pickwick Club..., edited by Boz") is published in London.

=== April–June ===
- April 20 – The Wisconsin Territory is created; the first capital is Belmont.
- April 21 – Texas Revolution – Battle of San Jacinto: Mexican forces under General Antonio López de Santa Anna are defeated at San Jacinto, Texas.
- April 22 – Texas Revolution: Forces under Texas General Sam Houston capture Mexican General Antonio López de Santa Anna.
- May 4 – The Ancient Order of Hibernians, an Irish Catholic fraternal organization, is founded in New York City.
- May 7 – The settlement of Mayagüez, Puerto Rico is elevated to the royal status of villa, by the government of Spain.
- May 14 – Texas Revolution: The Treaties of Velasco are signed, between Mexican General Antonio López de Santa Anna and the Republic of Texas. In exchange for his freedom and the guarantee of free passage back to Mexico, General Santa Anna gives his recognition to the independence of Texas. The Mexican government refuses to ratify the treaties.

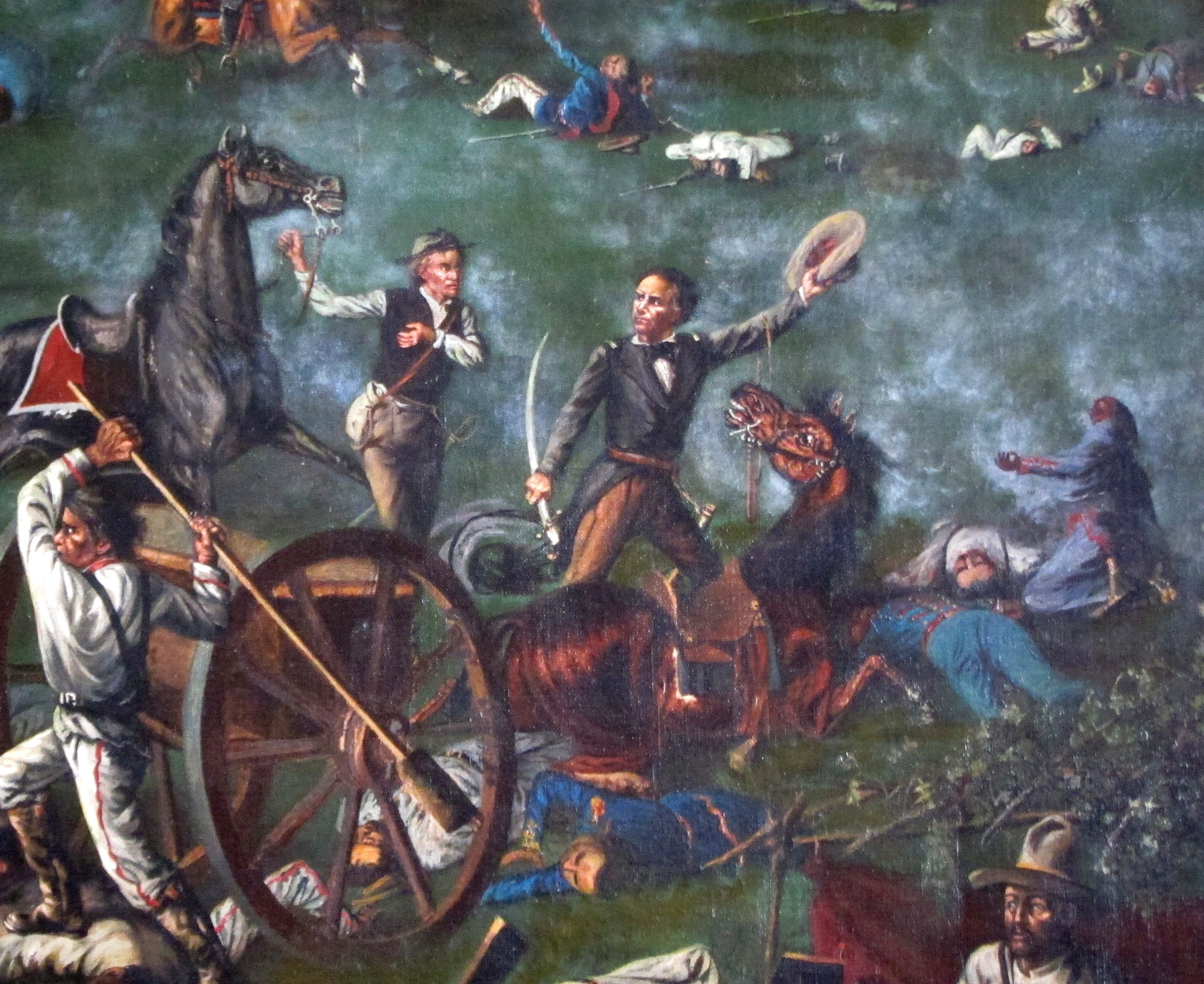
April 21: Battle of San Jacinto

- May 15 – During an eclipse of the Sun, English astronomer Francis Baily observes the phenomenon named after him as Baily's beads.
- May 19 – Fort Parker massacre: Among those captured by Native Americans is 9-year-old Cynthia Ann Parker. She later gives birth to a son named Quanah, who becomes the last chief of the Comanche.
- June 15 – Arkansas is admitted into as the 25th state of the United States of America.

=== July–September ===
- July 13 – The first numbered U.S. patent 1 (after filing 9,957 unnumbered patents) is granted to John Ruggles, for improvements to railroad steam locomotive tires.
- July 21 – The Champlain and St. Lawrence Railroad opens between St. John and La Prairie, Quebec, the first steam-worked passenger railroad in British North America.
- July 27 – The settlement of Adelaide, South Australia, is founded.
- July 29 – The Arc de Triomphe, is dedicated in Paris, France.
- July 30 – The first English-language newspaper is published in Hawaii.
- August 17 – The Marriage Act in the United Kingdom establishes civil marriage and registration systems that permit marriages in nonconformist chapels, and a Registrar General of Births, Marriages, and Deaths.
- August 30 – The settlement of Houston, Texas is founded.
- September 1 – Rebuilding begins at the Hurva Synagogue in Jerusalem.
- September 5 – Sam Houston is elected as the first president of the Republic of Texas.
- September 11 – The Riograndense Republic is proclaimed in South America.

=== October–December ===
- October 2 – Charles Darwin returns to England aboard HMS Beagle, with biological data he will later use to develop his theory of evolution, having left South America on August 17.
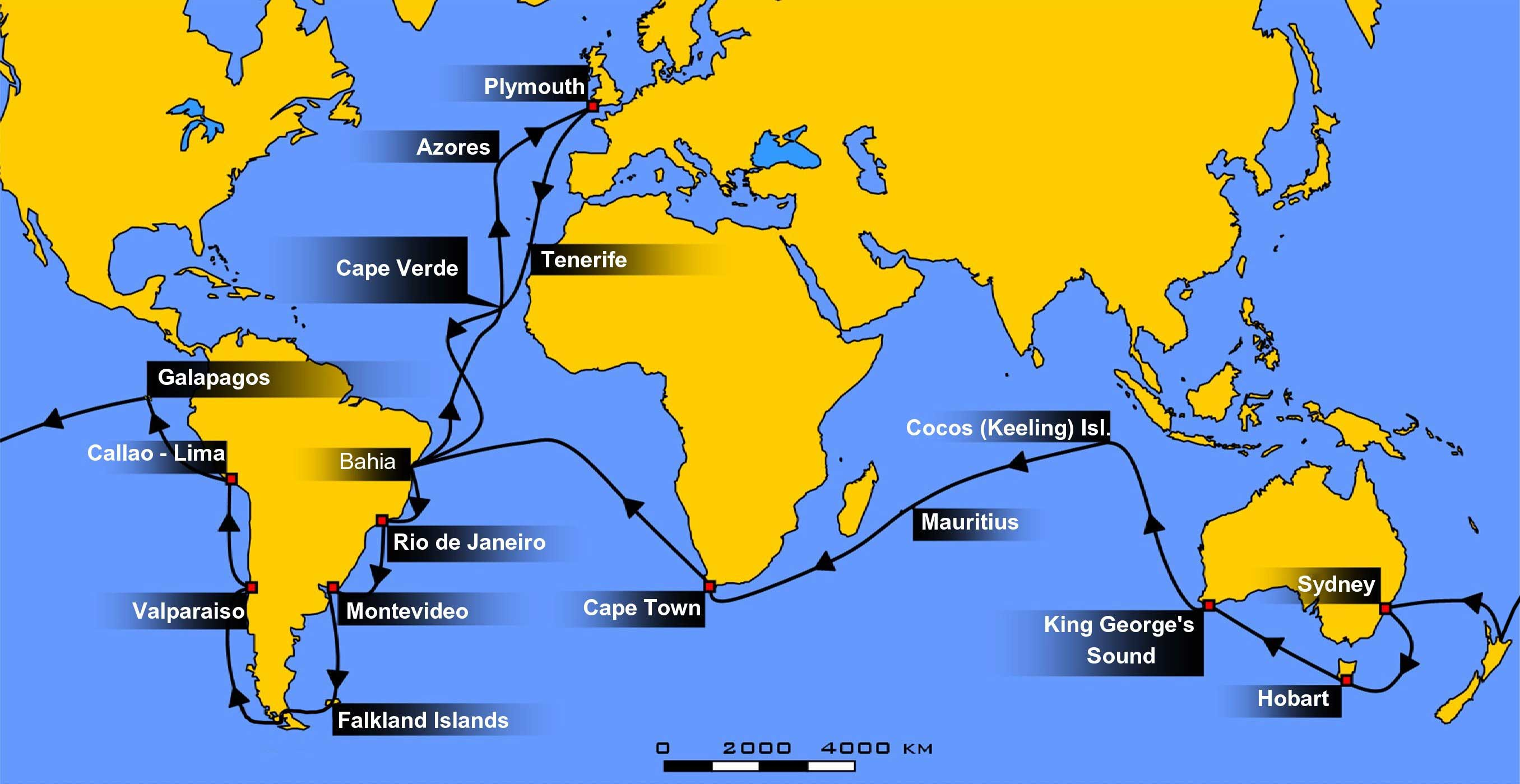
  October 2: Darwin returns aboard HMS Beagle.
- October 13 – Theodor Fliedner, a Lutheran minister, and Friederike, his wife, open the Deaconess Home and Hospital at Kaiserswerth, Germany, as an institute to train women in nursing.
- October 22 – Sam Houston is inaugurated as first elected President of the Republic of Texas.
- October 24 – The earliest United States patent for a phosphorus friction match is granted to Alonzo Dwight Phillips, of Springfield, Massachusetts.
- October 25 – Construction begins on the Wilmington and Raleigh Railroad in North Carolina. Due to a lack of support in Raleigh, the route is revised to run from Wilmington to the Petersburg Railroad in Weldon.
- October 30 – Louis Napoleon launches the unsuccessful Strasbourg Coup to overthrow the July Monarchy in France
- November 28 – The University of London is established by Royal Charter, with University College London and King's College London named as the first affiliated colleges.
- December 4 – The Whig Party (United States) holds its first national convention, in Harrisburg, Pennsylvania.
- December 7 – 1836 United States presidential election: Martin Van Buren defeats William Henry Harrison, and three other Whig candidates, marking the most recent time a Democrat is elected to succeed a two-term Democratic U.S. president.
- December 15 – The United States Patent Office burns in Washington, D.C.
- December 26 – The Crown colony of South Australia is officially proclaimed (subsequently celebrated in the state of South Australia as Proclamation Day).
- December 27 – Lewes avalanche: An avalanche at Lewes in Sussex, England, kills eight of fifteen people buried, when a row of cottages is engulfed in snow.
- December 28
  - Spain recognizes the independence of Mexico.
  - The Colony of South Australia is founded by Captain John Hindmarsh.
- December 30 – In Saint Petersburg, the Lehman Theater catches fire, killing 800 people.

=== Date unknown ===
- The first printed literature in Assyrian Neo-Aramaic is produced by Justin Perkins, an American Presbyterian missionary in Persia.
- The New Board brokerage group is founded in New York City.
- The Sylhet Government Pilot High School is established in Sylhet as Government Provisional School
- Eugène Schneider and his brother Adolphe Schneider purchase a bankrupt ironworks near the town of Le Creusot, in the Burgundy region of France, and found the steelworks and engineering company Schneider Frères & Cie.
- George Catlin ends his 6-year tour of 50 tribes in the Dakota Territory.
- John Murray III publishes A Hand-book for Travellers on the Continent; being a guide through Holland, Belgium, Prussia and northern Germany, and along the Rhine from Holland to Switzerland, the first of Murray's Handbooks for Travellers, in London.
- Chatsworth Head is found near Tamassos, Cyprus.
- In Munich, the art museum Alte Pinakothek opened.

== Births ==
=== January–June ===
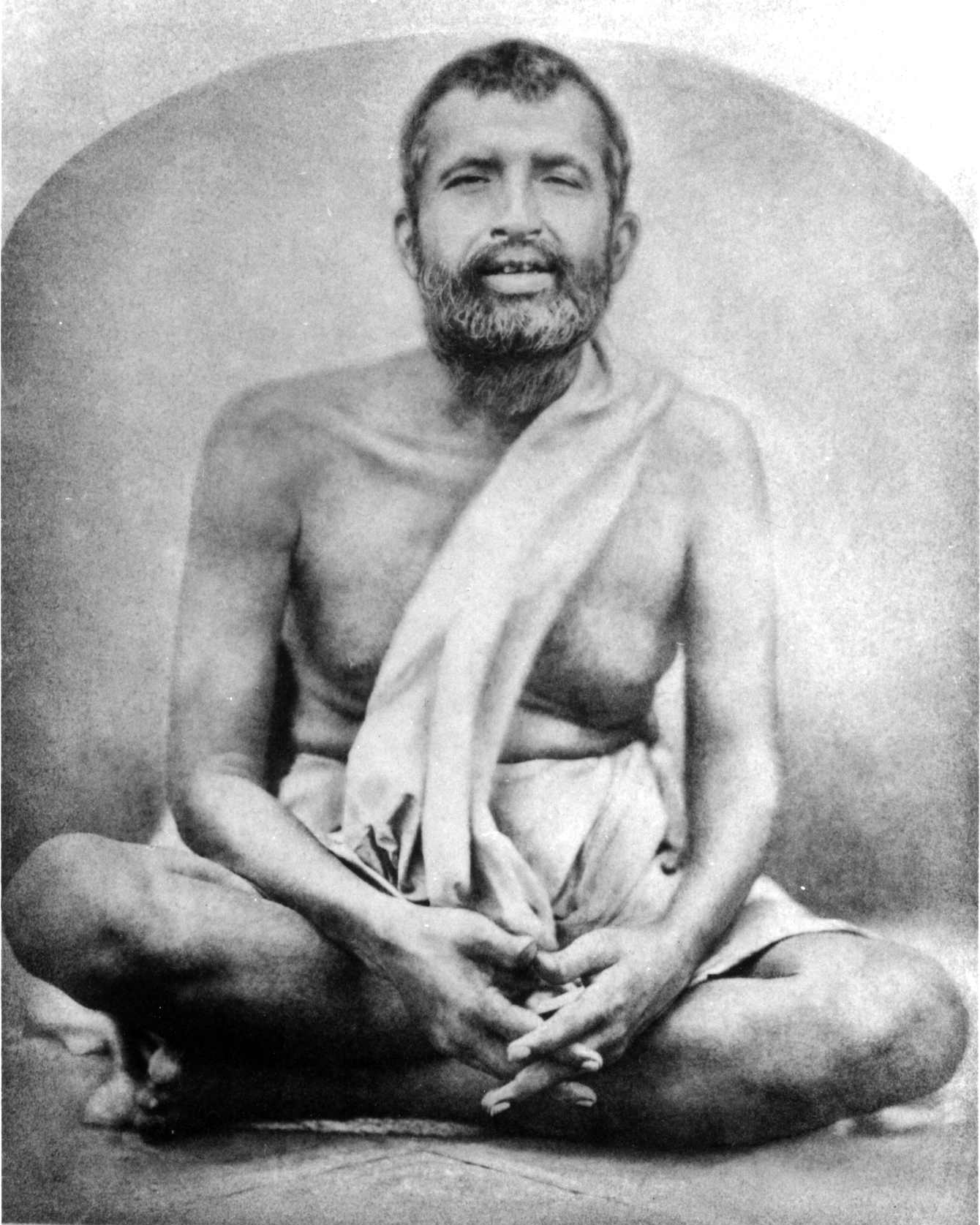
Ramakrishna

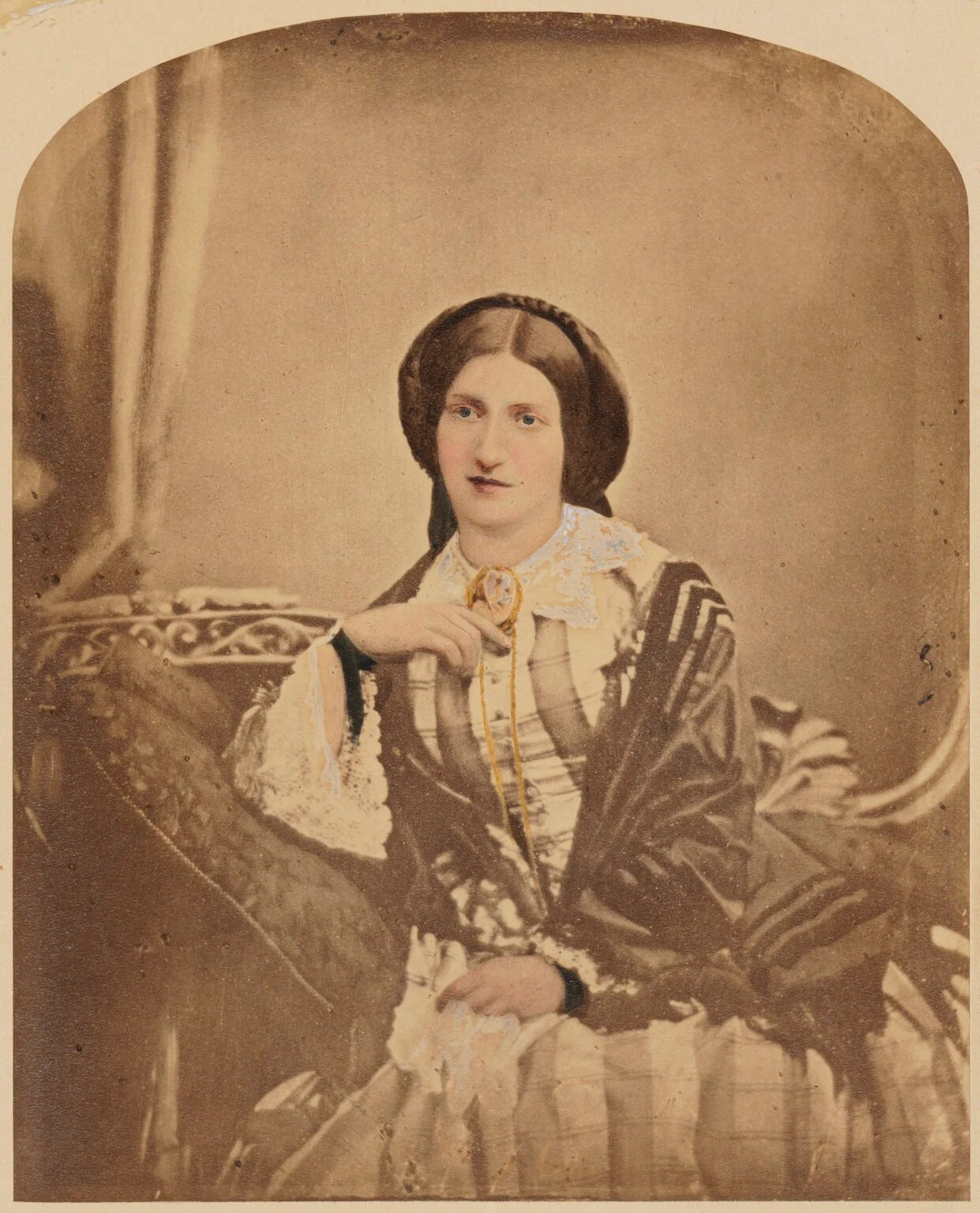
Isabella Beeton

- January 2 – Mendele Mocher Sforim, Russian Yiddish writer (d. 1917)
- January 8 – Sir Lawrence Alma-Tadema, Dutch-English painter (d. 1912)
- January 10 – Charles Phillip Ingalls, American pioneer, father of author Laura Ingalls Wilder (d. 1902)
- January 14
  - Henri Fantin-Latour, French painter (d. 1904)
  - Hugh Judson Kilpatrick, American general, politician, and diplomat (d. 1881)
- January 24 – Signe Rink, Greenland-born Danish writer, ethnologist (d. 1909)
- January 27 – Leopold von Sacher-Masoch, Austrian writer for whom masochism is named (d. 1895)
- February 5 – Tenshoin, wife of 13th Shōgun of Japan, Tokugawa Iesada (d.1883)
- February 16 – Robert Halpin, Irish mariner, cable layer (d. 1894)
- February 18 – Ramakrishna Paramhansa, Indian religious leader (d. 1886)
- February 21 – Léo Delibes, French composer (d. 1891)
- February 24 – Winslow Homer, American painter (d. 1910)
- March 2 – Henry Billings Brown, Associate Justice of the Supreme Court of the United States (d. 1913)
- March 4 – Stuart Robson, American stage comedian (d. 1903)
- March 12 – Isabella Beeton, English writer on household management (d. 1865)
- March 20 – Sir Edward Poynter, French-born British artist (d. 1919)
- March 28 – Frederick Pabst, German-American brewer (d. 1904)
- April 16 – Gootchaux Ettinger, French-Brazilian politician and industrialist (d. 1917)
- April 27 – Charles Bendire, U.S. Army captain, ornithologist (d. 1897)
- May 7 – Manuel de la Cámara y Libermoore, Spanish admiral (d. 1920)
- May 23 – Touch the Clouds, Native American chieftain (Teton Lakota Sioux) (d. 1905)
- May 26 – Mélanie de Pourtalès, French salonnière, courtier (d. 1914)
- May 27 – Jay Gould, American financier (d. 1892)
- May 28 – Friedrich Baumfelder, German composer, conductor, and pianist (d. 1916)
- May 31 – Jules Chéret, French printmaker (d. 1932)
- June 9 – Elizabeth Garrett Anderson, English physician, suffragette (d. 1910)
- June 16 – Wesley Merritt, American general (d. 1910)
- June 28 – Lyman J. Gage, American financier (d. 1927)

=== July–December ===
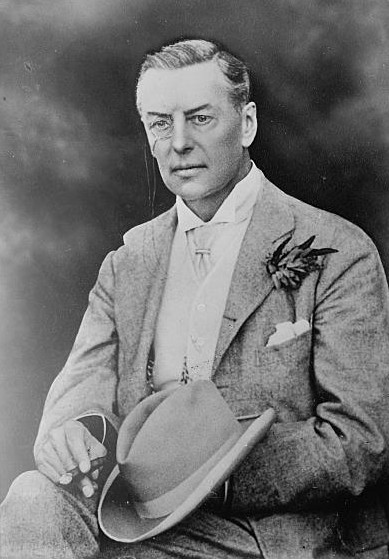
Joseph Chamberlain

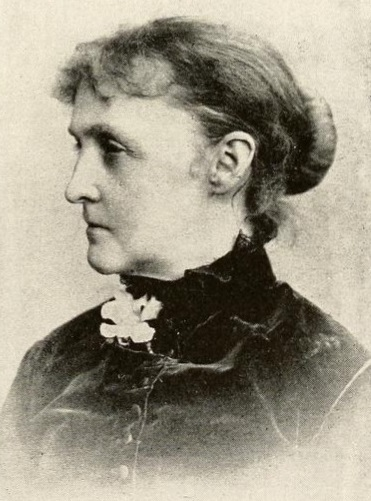
Sarah Morgan Bryan Piatt

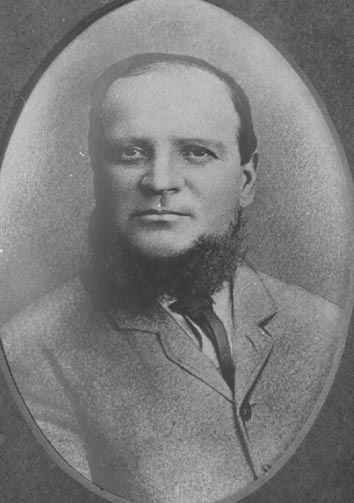
Benjamin Harris Babbidge

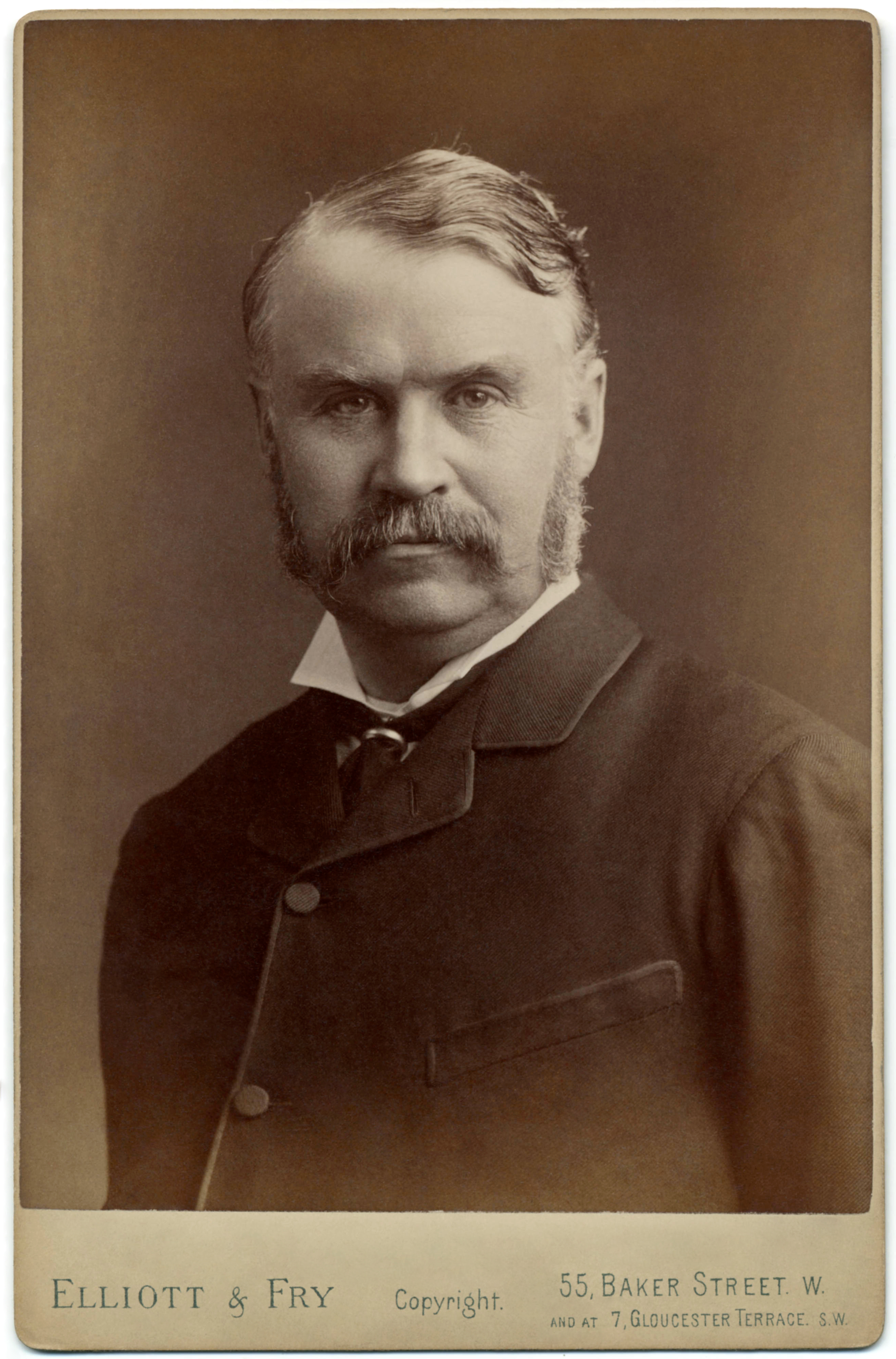
W.S. Gilbert

- July 8 – Joseph Chamberlain, British politician (d. 1914)
- July 9 – Camille of Renesse-Breidbach, Belgian nobleman, entrepreneur and author (d. 1904)
- July 24 – Jan Gotlib Bloch, Polish banker and warfare author (d. 1902)
- August 5 – John T. Raymond, American actor (d. 1887)
- August 11 – Sarah Morgan Bryan Piatt, American poet (d. 1919)
- August 13 – Bishop Nicholas of Japan, Japanese Orthodox priest (d. 1912)
- August 25 – Bret Harte, American writer (d. 1902)
- September 5 – Justiniano Borgoño, 37th Prime Minister of Peru (d. 1921)
- September 7 – Sir Henry Campbell-Bannerman, Prime Minister of the United Kingdom (d. 1908)
- September 10 – Joseph Wheeler, American general, politician (d. 1906)
- September 11 – Fitz Hugh Ludlow, American author (d. 1870)
- September 17 – William Jackson Palmer, American founder of Colorado Springs, Colorado (d. 1909)
- September 22 – Fredrique Paijkull, Swedish educator, folk high school pioneer (d. 1899)
- September 28 – Thomas Crapper, English plumber, inventor (d. 1910)
- September 30 – Remigio Morales Bermúdez, Peruvian politician, 56th President of Peru (d. 1894)
- October 2 – Benjamin Harris Babbidge, 19th Mayor of Brisbane (d. 1905)
- October 4 – Piet Cronjé, Boer general (d. 1911)
- October 5 – Enomoto Takeaki, Japanese samurai, admiral (d. 1908)
- October 6 – Heinrich Wilhelm Gottfried von Waldeyer-Hartz, German neuroanatomist (d. 1921)
- October 15 – James Tissot, French artist (d. 1902)
- October 27 – Thomas Gwyn Elger, English astronomer (d. 1897)
- November 3 – Elena Arellano Chamorro, Nicaraguan pioneer educator (d. 1911)
- November 8 – Milton Bradley, American businessman, inventor (d. 1911)
- November 10 – Andrés Avelino Cáceres, Peruvian general, twice President of Peru (d. 1923)
- November 11 – Thomas Bailey Aldrich, American poet, novelist (d. 1907)
- November 18
  - W. S. Gilbert, British playwright, librettist best known for his collaborations with Arthur Sullivan (d. 1911)
  - Máximo Gómez, Cuban military leader (d. 1905)
  - Ding Ruchang, Chinese army officer, admiral (d. 1895)
- November 22 – Sir George Barham, English businessman, founder of Express County Milk Supply Company (d. 1913)
- December 7 – Frank Manly Thorn, American lawyer, politician, essayist and journalist (d. 1907)
- December 18 – Kawamura Sumiyoshi, Japanese admiral (d. 1904)

== Deaths ==
=== January–June ===
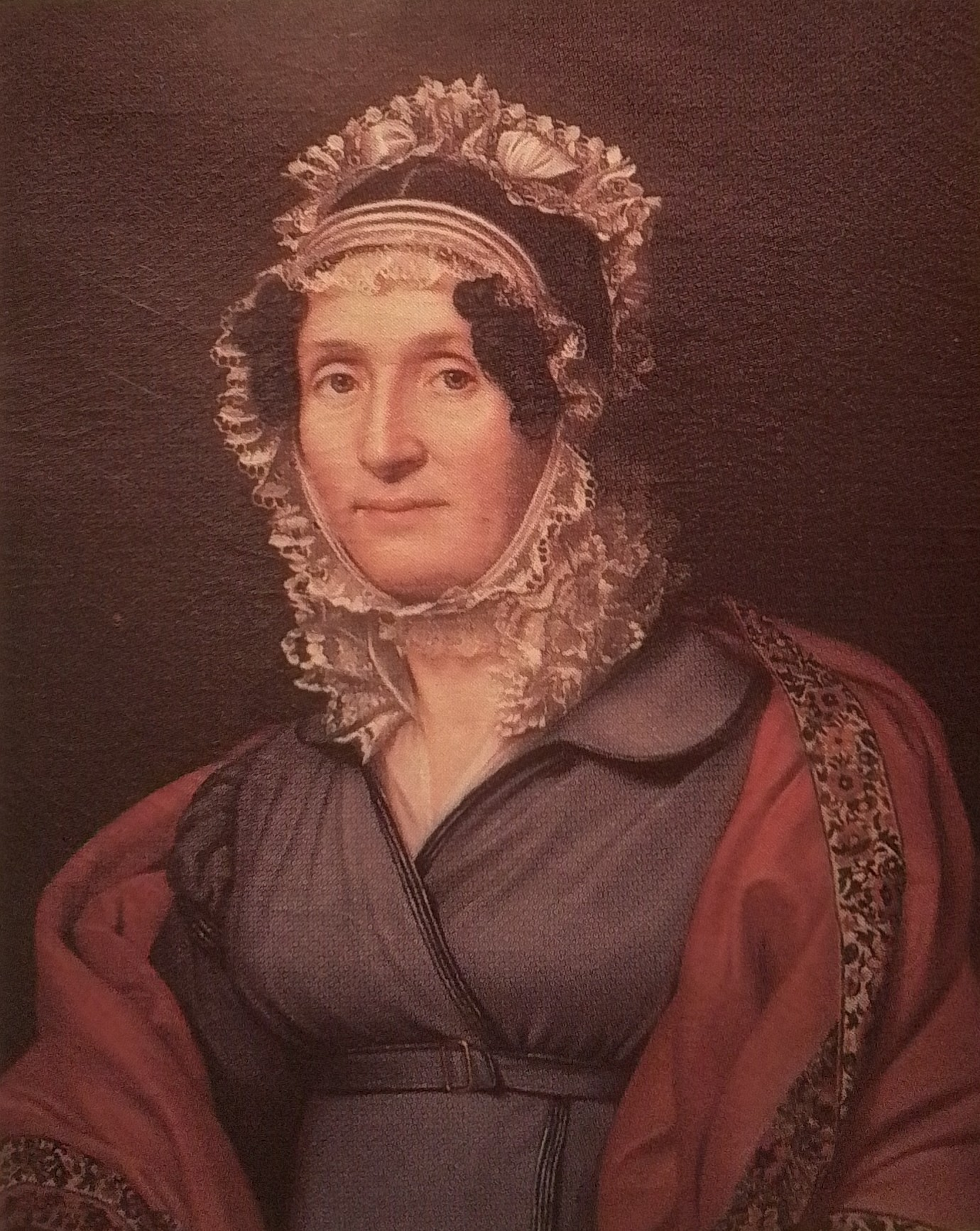
Madame Mère, mother of Napoleon I

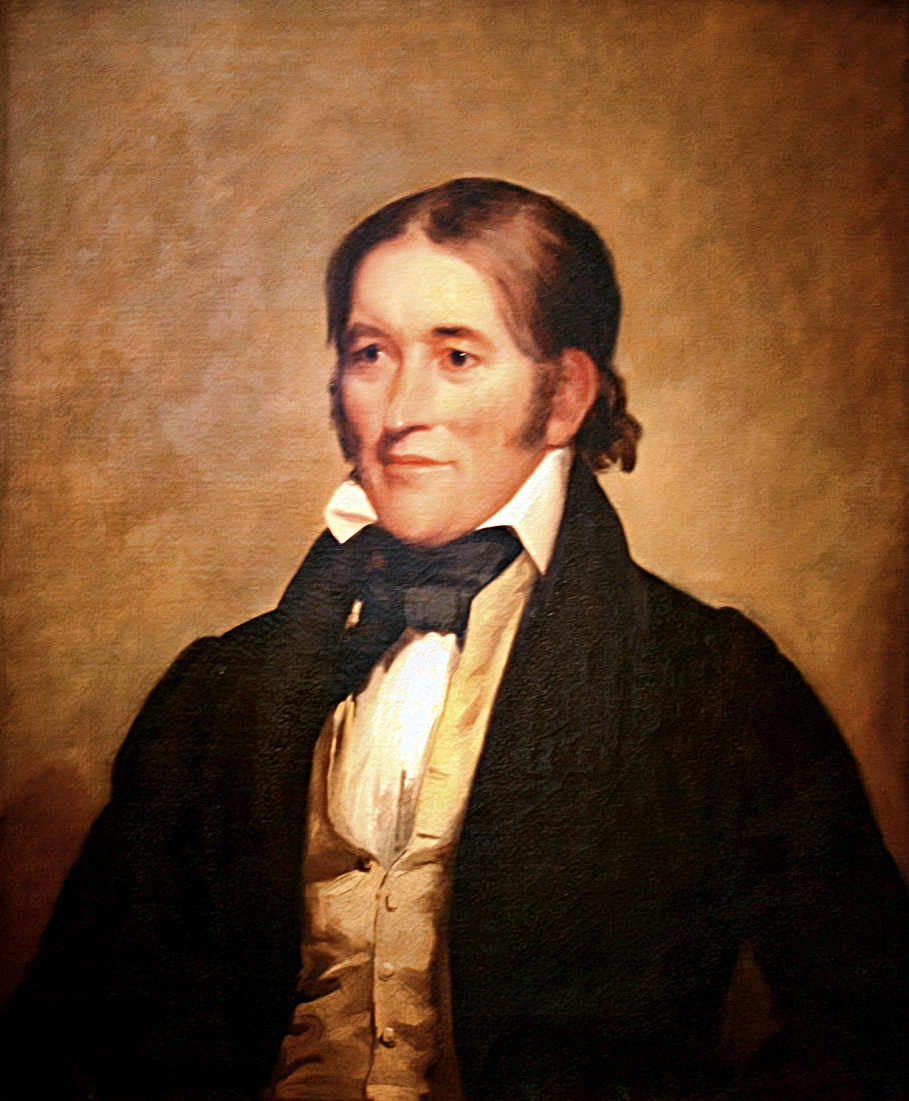
Davy Crockett

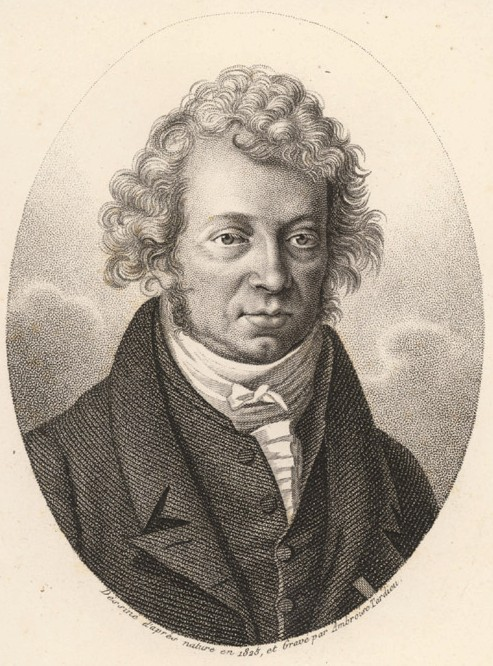
André-Marie Ampère

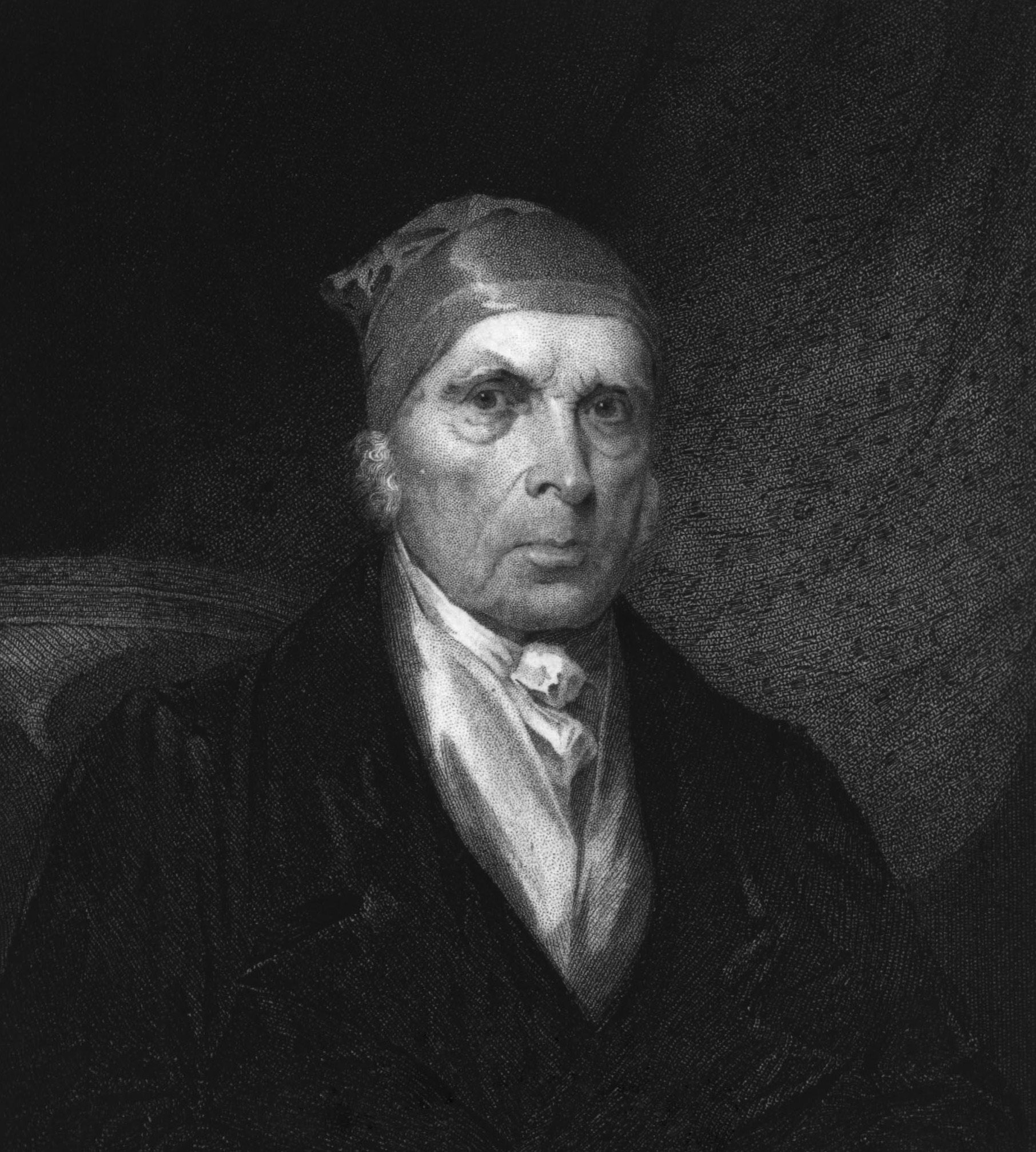
James Madison

- January 1 – Bernhard Meyer, German physician, ornithologist (b. 1767)
- January 11 – John Molson, Canadian entrepreneur (b. 1763)
- January 21 – Ferenc Novák, Hungarian Slovene writer (b. 1791)
- January 30 – Betsy Ross, maker, designer of the first American flag (b. 1752)
- January 31 – John Cheyne, British physician, surgeon and author (b. 1777)
- February 1 – Marie-Anne Pierrette Paulze, French chemist (b. 1758)
- February 2 – Madame Mère (Letizia Ramolino Bonaparte) mother of Napoleon I (b. 1749)
- February 18 – Cornplanter, native American (Seneca) chief (b. 1750)
- February 21 – William Van Mildert, last Prince Bishop of Durham, and founder of Durham University (b. 1765)
- March 2 – James Grant, Texas politician, physician and military participant in the Texas Revolution (b. 1793)
- March 6 (at the Alamo)
  - James Bowie, Texan revolutionary (b. 1796)
  - Davy Crockett, American frontiersman, Congressman and soldier (b. 1786)
  - William Barret Travis, Texan revolutionary (b. 1809)
  - James Bonham, Alamo defender (b. 1807)
  - Micajah Autry, Alamo defender (b. 1793)
  - Almaron Dickinson, American soldier (b. 1800)
  - Jośe Gregorio Esparza, Alamo defender (b. 1802)
- March 16 – Nathaniel Bowditch, American mathematician (b. 1773)
- March 27 – James Fannin, Texas revolutionary (b. 1804)
- April 7 – William Godwin, English writer (b. 1756)
- April 21 – Manuel Fernández Castrillón, Mexican general (b. 1780)
- April 29 – Simon Kenton, American frontiersman, Revolutionary militia general (b. 1755)
- May 13 – John Littlejohn, American sheriff and Methodist preacher (b. 1756)
- May 23 – Edward Livingston, American jurist, statesman (b. 1764)
- June 10 – André-Marie Ampère, French physicist (b. 1775)
- June 20 – Emmanuel Joseph Sieyès, French cleric, constitutional theorist (b. 1748)
- June 23 – James Mill, British historian, economist, political theorist, and philosopher (b. 1773)
- June 28 – James Madison, 85, 4th President of the United States (b. 1751)

=== July–December ===
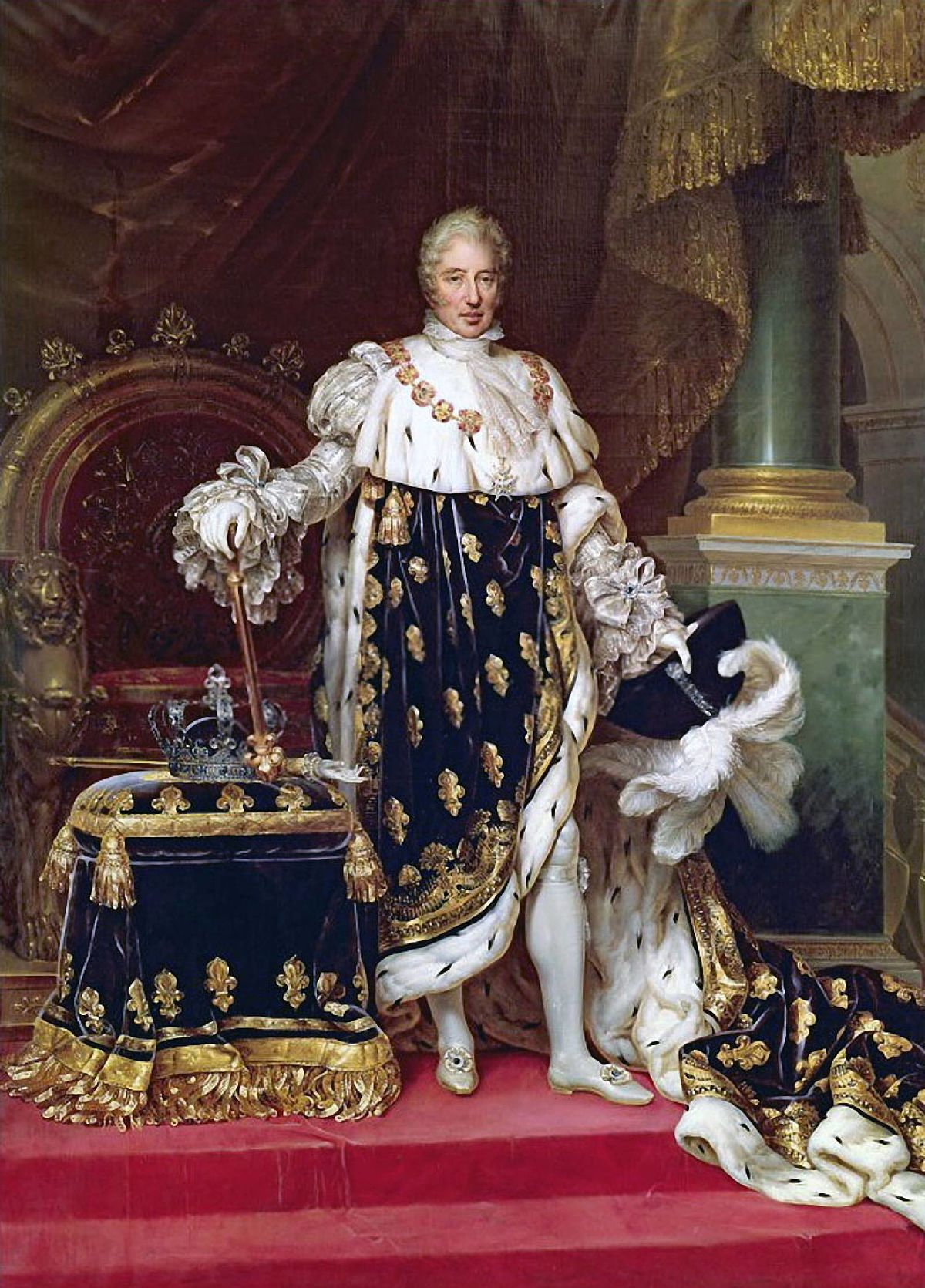
Charles X of France

- August 20 – Agnes Bulmer, English poet (b. 1775)
- August 21 – Claude-Louis Navier, French engineer, physicist (b. 1785)
- August 25 – Christoph Wilhelm Hufeland, German physician (b. 1762)
- September 5 – Ferdinand Raimund, Austrian playwright (b. 1790)
- September 12 – Christian Dietrich Grabbe, German playwright (b. 1801)
- September 14 – Aaron Burr, 3rd Vice President of the United States (b. 1756)
- September 17 – Antoine Laurent de Jussieu, French botanist (b. 1748)
- September 23
  - Maria Malibran, Spanish-French operatic singer (b. 1808)
  - Andrey Razumovsky, Russian diplomat (b. 1752)
- November – Tenskwatawa, Shawnee prophet, political leader (b. 1775)
- November 5 – Karel Hynek Mácha, Czech poet (b. 1810)
- November 6 – King Charles X of France (b. 1757)
- November 16 – Christiaan Hendrik Persoon, Dutch mycologist (b. 1761)
- November 26 – John Loudon McAdam, Scottish engineer, road-builder (b. 1756)
- December 27 – Stephen F. Austin, American pioneer (b. 1793)

=== 1836 in Popular Culture ===
1836 serves as the start date for the grand strategy video games Victoria: An Empire Under the Sun, Victoria II, and Victoria 3 by Paradox Development Studio.
