= David Bowman (politician) =

Australian politician (1860–1916)

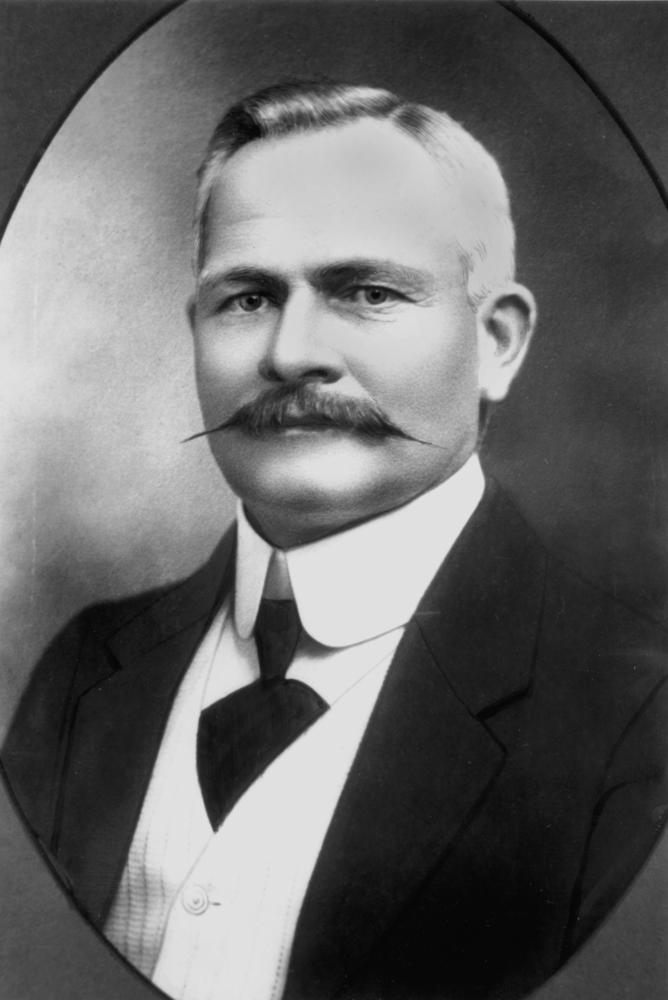
- Bowman in 1915

Leader of the Opposition in Queensland Elections: 1907, 1908, 1909, 1912
- In office 16 November 1908 – 6 September 1912
- Preceded by: Robert Philp
- Succeeded by: T. J. Ryan

Leader of the Labor Party in Queensland
- In office 15 April 1907 – 6 September 1912
- Preceded by: George Kerr
- Succeeded by: T. J. Ryan

Home Secretary of Queensland
- In office 1 June 1915 – 25 February 1916
- Preceded by: Kenneth Grant
- Succeeded by: T. J. Ryan

Member of the Queensland Parliament for Warrego
- In office 16 December 1899 – 11 March 1902
- Preceded by: William Hood
- Succeeded by: Patrick Leahy

Member of the Queensland Parliament for Fortitude Valley
- In office 27 August 1904 – 25 February 1916
- Preceded by: John McMaster
- Succeeded by: Thomas Wilson

Personal details
- Born: David Bowman; 24 August 1860 Bendigo, Victoria, Australia
- Died: 25 February 1916 (aged 55) Brisbane, Queensland, Australia
- Resting place: Toowong Cemetery
- Party: Labor
- Spouse: Elizabeth Jane Fisher
- Occupation: Bootmaker, Union official

David Bowman (24 August 1860 – 25 February 1916) was a Labor politician in the Legislative Assembly of Queensland and Queensland Leader of the Opposition from 1908 to 1912.

== Early life ==
Bowman was born in Bendigo, Victoria on 4 August 1860. He was son of Archibald Bowman, a miner and Isabella Bowman (née Spence) both of whom were born in Scotland. Trained as a bootmaker in Victoria, Bowman moved north to Queensland in 1888. The following year, Bowman became the president of the Brisbane District Council of the Australian Labour Federation (ALF). In 1891, as an employee of the ALF, Bowman was responsible for organizing shearers and bushworkers during the pastoral strike. In 1892, he was elected as vice-president and the following year he became the president of the ALF.

== Politics ==
Bowman's first attempt at entering politics was at the 1893 colonial election in the seat South Brisbane, losing out to Harry Turley and Charles Midson in the two member electorate. At the 1899 election, Bowman ran again, this time in the rural south western seat of Warrego. Ministerialist William Hood had been returned by a one-vote majority. Bowman, the sole opponent, filed a petition against Hood's return and on 21 November 1899, the election was declared void. Bowman won the resulting by-election on 16 December 1899 with a majority of 44 votes. At the following election in 1902, Bowman lost in his seat to Ministerialist, Patrick Leahy. After the defeat, he returned to Brisbane where he opened a newsagency at New Farm.

Bowman stood again at the 1904 election in the north eastern Brisbane seat of Fortitude Valley where he was victorious. He was returned as the Member for Fortitude Valley in the next six elections, holding the seat until his death.

Though accepting his party's decision to join the Morgan-Browne coalition in September 1903, Bowman believed that Labor should not ally itself with other parties but should aim to govern in its own right. By 1905, he had joined Albert Hinchcliffe and Mat Reid, secretary and president of the Central Political Executive, and Henry Boote, editor of The Worker, in opposing the continuation of the Liberal-Labor coalition, now dominated by William Kidston.

Bowman became vice-president of the Central Political Executive in 1904 and at the 1905 and 1907 Labor in Politics conventions led a parliamentary faction opposed to Kidston, which succeeded in committing the party to fighting future elections alone. George Kerr, Labor leader from 1904 to 1907 supported the continuation of the coalition but was decisively defeated when the convention resolved that Labor should stand alone. Following the 1907 convention, Bowman was elected as the parliamentary Labor leader. He was not an outstanding parliamentarian and was disabled as a leader by poor health. He was, however, liked and respected for his personality and integrity by colleagues and opponents alike.

Bowman lead Labor into the 1907, 1908, 1909 and 1912 state elections failing to win a majority every time.

After the 1912 election, Bowman resigned as leader and T. J. Ryan was elected in his place. Ryan led Labor to their first majority government in Queensland at the 1915 election, winning 45 of the 72 seats. On 1 June, Bowman was sworn in as the Home Secretary as part the Ryan Ministry. However, his health was so poor that John Huxham became his assistant minister.

== Personal life ==
Bowman married Elizabeth Jane Fisher on 20 May 1885 in Ballarat. Together they had two daughters and two sons.

== Death ==
Bowman died in Brisbane on 25 February 1916. He was buried in Toowong Cemetery with Presbyterian rites.

== Legacy ==
In 1948, the newly proclaimed Queensland federal electoral division of Bowman was named in honour. Bowman Park at Simpsons Road Bardon (at that time known as 'Upper Paddington') was also named in his honour, shortly after his death in 1916.

Political offices
Preceded by Robert Philp	Leader of the Opposition in Queensland; 1908 – 1912	Succeeded by T. J. Ryan
Preceded by Kenneth Grant	Home Secretary of Queensland; 1915 – 1916	Succeeded by T. J. Ryan
Party political offices
Preceded by George Kerr	Leader of the Labor Party in Queensland; 1907 – 1912	Succeeded by T. J. Ryan
Parliament of Queensland
Preceded by William Hood	Member for Warrego; 1899 – 1902	Succeeded by Patrick Leahy
Preceded by John McMaster	Member for Fortitude Valley; 1904 – 1916; Served alongside: McDonnell, McMaster, McLachlan	Succeeded by Thomas Wilson
