= Robert Fraser (politician) =

Australian politician

Bob Fraser
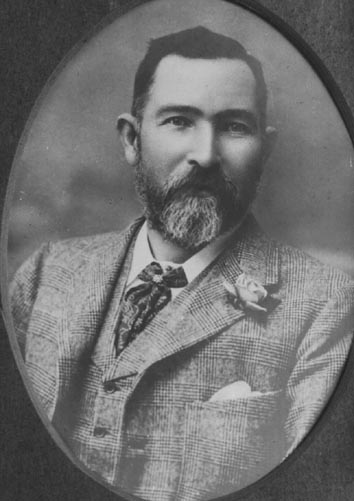

25th Mayor of Brisbane
- In office 1894–1895
- Preceded by: John McMaster
- Succeeded by: Robert Thurlow

Member of the Queensland Legislative Assembly for Brisbane North
- In office 21 March 1896 – 11 March 1899 Serving with Thomas MacDonald-Paterson
- Preceded by: John Kingsbury
- Succeeded by: Edward Forrest

Personal details
- Born: Robert Fraser c. 1843 Beauly, Inverness, Scotland
- Died: 9 September 1918 (aged 74 or 75) Brisbane, Queensland, Australia
- Resting place: Toowong Cemetery
- Party: Ministerialist
- Spouse: Emily Wherry
- Occupation: Draper

Robert Fraser (c. 1843 – 9 September 1918) was a Mayor of Brisbane and member of the Queensland Legislative Assembly.

== Early years ==
Fraser was born in Beauly, Inverness to parents Robert Fraser and his wife Christina (née Grant) and educated at Balbair. He began his working career as an apprentice draper in Tranent, Haddingtonshire, before working as assistant manager and then general manager of McLaren Smith & Co, warehousemen, Glasgow for ten years starting in 1868.

He arrived in Brisbane in 1878 and began work with D. L. Brown and Co. where he worked in the woolen section of their department store. From 1888 he ran his own drapery business for twenty years until his retirement in 1908.

== Political career ==
Fraser first entered politics in 1891 as an alderman in Brisbane and remained on the council until 1906. During this time, he was Mayor of Brisbane from 1894 until 1895.

He stood as a candidate for the two member seat of Brisbane North at the 1896 elections. Although opposing the Ministerial Government representatives of T. J. Byrnes and J.J. Kingsbury, both Fraser and his partner, Thomas MacDonald-Paterson, claimed to also be members of the Ministerialist group. In a tight contest, both Fraser and MacDonald-Paterson won a seat.

Fraser held the seat for three years before being defeated Edward Forrest by at the 1899 elections.

== Personal life ==
Fraser married Emily Wherry in Scotland and together had three daughters. He was one of the founders of the Scottish Rifles of which he was an honorary captain. He was also a founder of lawn bowls in Queensland and was a life member of the Booroodabin Bowls Club. Fraser was at one-time president of the Tattersalls Club in Brisbane and was a life member of the Queensland Royal Geographical Society.

Fraser died in Brisbane in September 1918. His funeral proceeded from "Graceville", in Dean Street, Toowong to the Toowong Cemetery.

Civic offices
Preceded by John McMaster	Mayor of Brisbane; 1894-1895	Succeeded by Robert Thurlow
Parliament of Queensland
Preceded by John Kingsbury	Member for Brisbane; 1896–1899; Served alongside: Thomas MacDonald-Paterson	Succeeded by Edward Forrest
