= John McMaster (mayor) =

Australian politician

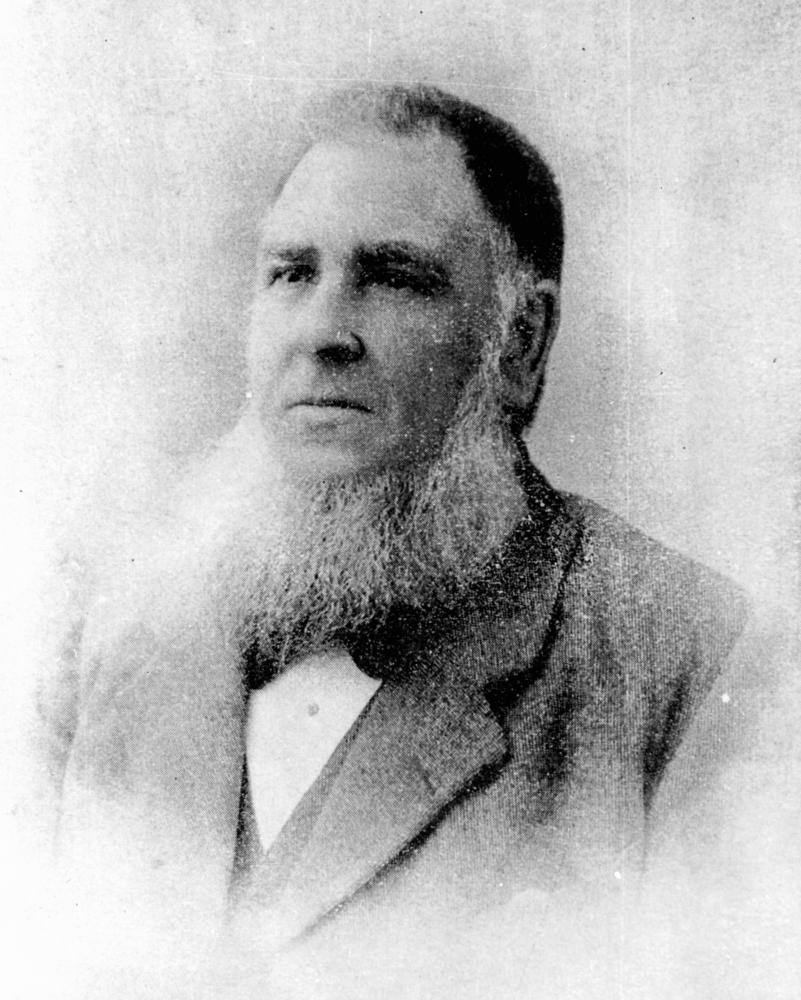
- John McMaster ca. 1895.

18th Mayor of Brisbane
- In office 1884–1884
- Preceded by: Abram Robertson Byram
- Succeeded by: Benjamin Harris Babbidge
- In office 1890–1890
- Preceded by: William McNaughton Galloway
- Succeeded by: John Allworth Clark
- In office 1893–1893
- Preceded by: George Watson
- Succeeded by: Robert Fraser
- In office 1897–1897
- Preceded by: Robert Woods Thurlow
- Succeeded by: William Thorne
- In office 1918–1919
- Preceded by: John Hetherington
- Succeeded by: Charles Packenham Buchanan

Member of the Queensland Legislative Assembly for Fortitude Valley
- In office 14 September 1885 – 11 March 1899 Serving with Samuel Brooks, John Watson, Frank McDonnell
- Preceded by: New seat
- Succeeded by: William Guy Higgs
- In office 3 August 1901 – 27 August 1904 Serving with Frank McDonnell
- Preceded by: William Guy Higgs
- Succeeded by: David Bowman
- In office 18 May 1907 – 5 February 1908 Serving with David Bowman
- Preceded by: Frank McDonnell
- Succeeded by: Peter Alfred McLachlan

Member of the Queensland Legislative Council
- In office 9 May 1899 – 22 July 1901

Personal details
- Born: 26 June 1830 Islay, Scotland
- Died: 29 February 1924 (aged 93) Brisbane, Queensland
- Resting place: Nundah Cemetery
- Party: Ministerial
- Spouse: Catherine McInnes
- Occupation: Stonemason

John McMaster (26 June 1830 – 29 February 1924) was an alderman and mayor of Brisbane, Queensland, Australia. He was a Member of the Legislative Assembly of Queensland and a Member of the Legislative Council of Queensland.

== Personal life ==
John McMaster was born in 1830 in Argyllshire, Scotland, the son of John McMaster and Isabella White. On 9 April 1854 he married Catherine McInnes, daughter of Neill McInnes and Mary Reid, at Maybole, Ayrshire, Scotland.

John and Catherine McMaster immigrated to Queensland, Australia on the ship "William Miles" arriving January 1855 and became a freehold farmer at Melton Hill near Nundah.

John and Catherine McMaster had the following children:

- Isabella, born Queensland 1857
- John Neill, born Brisbane 1860, died Brisbane 1917
- Neill, born Brisbane 1862, died Brisbane 1895
- James, born Brisbane 1864
- Mary Jane, born Brisbane 1866, died Brisbane 1948
- Catherine, born Brisbane 1869
- Ellen, born Brisbane 1871
- Colin John Wesley, born Brisbane 1874, died Brisbane 1950

His wife Catherine died in Brisbane on Friday 24 January 1879 and was buried on Saturday 25 January 1879 in the Nundah Cemetery.

Following an illness of several months, John McMaster died at the home of his granddaughter at Kent Street, New Farm, Brisbane on Friday 29 February 1924 aged 93 years. He was buried on Saturday 1 March 1924 in the Nundah Cemetery.

== Public life ==
John McMaster was an alderman of the Brisbane Municipal Council 1872–1874 and 1876–1899 and an alderman of the Brisbane City Council 1905–1921. He was mayor in 1884, 1890, 1893, 1897, and 1918–1919. He served on the following committees:

- Finance Committee 1872, 1874, 1876, 1878–1880, 1882, 1885, 1887, 1889, 1891, 1894, 1896, 1899, 1908, 1910, 1913, 1915, 1917, 1919
- Legislative Committee 1872–1874, 1879, 1881, 1883, 1884, 1886, 1887, 1890, 1891, 1894, 1896, 1899, 1906, 1907
- Improvement Committee 1873, 1877
- Works Committee 1883, 1884, 1886, 1887, 1890, 1892, 1893, 1895, 1897, 1898, 1906, 1907, 1909, 1911, 1912, 1914, 1918, 1919
- Health Committee 1884, 1892, 1893, 1895, 1897, 1898, 1905, 1911, 1913
- Street Lighting Committee 1891, 1893
- Parks Committee 1897, 1898, 1917, 1918, 1920–1921
- Building & Alignments of Roads Committee 1905–1908, 1913
- Special Sewerage Committee 1905, 1907
- Markets Committee 1907, 1908, 1910–1914
- General Purpose Committee 1910, 1912, 1915–1917
- Lightning Committee 1908, 1909
- Wharves Special Committee 1914–1918
- New Parks Special Committee 1914
- Parks Special Committee 1915
- Corporation Yard Special Committee 1916
- Town Hall Special Committee 1918
- City of Brisbane Incorporation Act Special Committee 1918
- Special Street War Names & Anzac Square Committee 1919

John McMaster was the Member of the Legislative Assembly of Queensland for the electorate of Fortitude Valley from 14 September 1885 to 11 March 1899 as a member of the Ministerialist party. John McMaster was appointed a Member of the Queensland Legislative Council on 9 May 1899 (a life appointment) but resigned on 22 July 1901 to stand again for election as a Member of the Legislative Assembly of Queensland. He was successful and served again as a Member of the Legislative Assembly for the electorate of Fortitude Valley from 3 August 1901 to 27 August 1904, again as a member of the Ministerialist party. He was elected again from 18 May 1907 to 5 February 1908 as a Member of the Legislative Assembly of Queensland for the electorate of Fortitude Valley as a member of the Opposition party.

== See also ==
- List of mayors and lord mayors of Brisbane
- Photo of John McMaster, 1883

Civic offices
Preceded by Abram Robertson Byram	Mayor of Brisbane; 1884	Succeeded by Benjamin Harris Babbidge
Preceded by William McNaughton Galloway	Mayor of Brisbane; 1890	Succeeded by John Allworth Clark
Preceded by George Watson	Mayor of Brisbane; 1893	Succeeded by Robert Fraser
Preceded by Robert Woods Thurlow	Mayor of Brisbane; 1897	Succeeded by William Thorne
Preceded by John Hetherington	Mayor of Brisbane; 1918–1919	Succeeded by Charles Packenham Buchanan
Parliament of Queensland
New seat	Member for Fortitude Valley; 1885–1899; Served alongside: Samuel Brooks, John Watson, Frank McDonnell	Succeeded by William Guy Higgs
Preceded by William Guy Higgs	Member for Fortitude Valley; 1901–1904; Served alongside: Frank McDonnell	Succeeded by David Bowman
Preceded by Frank McDonnell	Member for Fortitude Valley; 1907–1908; Served alongside: David Bowman	Succeeded by Peter Alfred McLachlan
