= Tudor Fieldhouse =

Arena in Houston, Texas, US

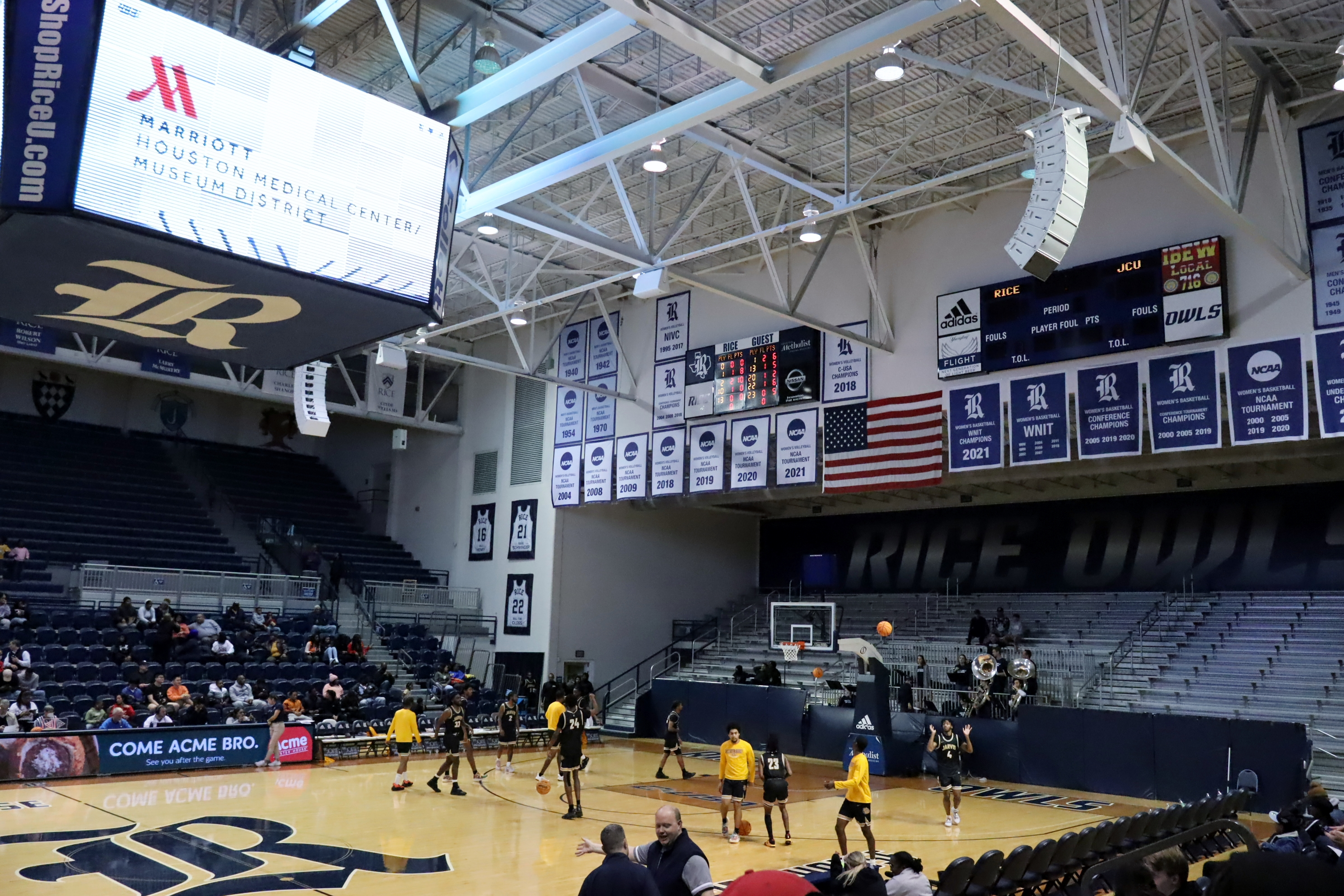
- Tudor Fieldhouse before a basketball game in 2022
- Interactive map of Tudor Fieldhouse
- Former names: Rice Gymnasium (1950–2008)
- Location: 6100 Main Street; Houston, Texas 77251
- Coordinates: 29.715102°N 95.403895°W
- Owner: Rice University
- Operator: Rice University
- Capacity: 5,208

Construction
- Opened: 1950
- Renovated: 2008; 2014

Tenants
- Rice Owls men's basketball Rice Owls women's basketball Rice Owls women's volleyball

Tudor Fieldhouse is a multi-purpose arena in Houston, Texas. Previously known as Rice Gymnasium, it was renamed in honor of Rice University alum Bobby Tudor, who spearheaded the renovation of the facility with a multimillion-dollar donation. The court is designated "Autry Court" in memory of Mrs. James L. Autry. Her husband James Lockhart Autry was a descendant of Micajah Autry, who was at the Battle of the Alamo. Her daughter, Mrs. Edward W. Kelley, made a generous donation to the gymnasium building fund in honor of her late mother, an ardent supporter of Rice. The arena opened in 1950. It is home to the Rice Owls men's and women's basketball, and volleyball teams.

== History ==
The facility was constructed in 1950 for the Rice basketball, volleyball and swim teams. An air conditioning system was added in 1991. Other renovations include a new ceiling, new lighting, and a new scoreboard. The facility currently seats 5,000 people.

Autry Court is home to the Autry Army, a student group that attends Rice basketball games. Former University of Memphis head coach John Calipari referred to the group as the “Blue Army of Death”. A blue curtain is positioned along one side of the court. After games, young spectators may attempt a free throw to win a basketball.

On February 7, 2007, a $23 million renovation of Autry Court was announced by Rice University. The renovations are to be completed in time for the 2008-09 basketball season. In the interim, Rice played its home games at Merrell Center in Katy (5 games), Reliant Arena (8 games) and Toyota Center (1 game) in Houston.

On July 29, 2008, Rice unveiled the new name of the arena, Tudor Fieldhouse, within a press release outlining non-conference opponents for the upcoming basketball season.

== See also ==
- List of NCAA Division I basketball arenas
