= John Watson (Queensland politician) =

Australian politician

Member of the Queensland Legislative Assembly for Fortitude Valley
- In office 12 May 1888 – 21 March 1896
- Preceded by: Samuel Brooks
- Succeeded by: Frank McDonnell

Personal details
- Born: John Watson; July 1833 Aberdeen, Scotland
- Died: 3 July 1912 (aged 78 or 79) Bulimba, Queensland, Australia
- Resting place: Toowong Cemetery
- Party: Ministerial
- Spouse(s): Eliza Davis (m.1856 d.1880), Elizabeth Mary Frances Gillies (m.1881 d.1907), Christina Marie Guymer (m.1908)
- Occupation: Shipwright

John Watson (July 1833 – 3 July 1912) was an Australian politician who served as a member for Fortitude Valley in the Queensland Legislative Assembly.

== Early life ==
Watson was born in Aberdeen, Scotland, in July 1833, He served an apprenticeship there with Messrs. Hall Bros., ship builders. He arrived in Sydney in 1857, and came on to Brisbane in 1864 (five years after Queensland had been become a separate colony). He entered into business as a shipwright at Bulimba, but undertook the construction of many bridges. The Burdekin bridge, near Charters Towers, was one of his early contracts and he later built the Mackay embankment, the municipal wharves at Petrie Bight, the Musgrave wharf at South Brisbane, and 750 feet of the South Brisbane railway wharf.

== Public life ==
Watson became a member of the Booroodabin Divisional Board, and about 1888 was elected to the Bulimba Divisional Board, of which he was twice chairman. ln 1886, he contested the Fortitude Valley seat for the Queensland Legislative Assembly, but was defeated. He tried again in 1888 and was elected and was re-elected in 1893.

== Family life ==
Watson had three wives:

- Eliza Davis (married 1856, died 1880)
- Elizabeth Mary Frances Gillies (married 14 August 1881, died 11 September 1907)
- Christina Marie Guymer (married 28 July 1908)

== Later life ==
Watson retired from business, but maintained his connection with the Balmoral Shire Council until shortly before his death. He was also chairman of that council for some time, and his practical knowledge gained in his former business often was of use to the members.

Watson died on Wednesday 3 July 1912. He was survived by his third wife. His funeral was held at St Stephen's Catholic Cathedral in Brisbane and he was buried in Toowong Cemetery.

Parliament of Queensland
Preceded by Samuel Brooks	Member for Fortitude Valley; 1888–1896; Served alongside: John McMaster	Succeeded by Frank McDonnell
