= Electoral district of Fortitude Valley =

Former state electoral district of Queensland, Australia

Coordinates: 27.4578°S 153.0340°E

Fortitude Valley Queensland—Legislative Assembly
- State: Queensland
- Created: 1859
- Abolished: 1959
- Namesake: Fortitude Valley, Queensland

Fortitude Valley, originally known as Hamlet of Fortitude Valley, was a Legislative Assembly electorate in the state of Queensland.

== History ==
Fortitude Valley was one of the original sixteen electorates proclaimed in 1859. It was originally known as "Hamlet of Fortitude Valley", but the name was shortened to "Fortitude Valley" in the 1872 redistribution. Initially it was a single member constituency, but became a dual member constituency in 1885, reverting to a single member in the 1910 redistribution. The electorate was abolished in the 1959 redistribution, mostly being incorporated into the Electoral district of Brisbane and the Electoral district of Merthyr.

Notably, Fortitude Valley was the first electorate in any Australian parliament to be contested by a member of the labour movement, with William McNaughton Galloway, the president of the Brisbane Trades and Labour Council and secretary of the Seamen's Union, unsuccessfully contesting the 1888 by-election.

== Members ==
The following members were elected:

Single-member constituency (1860–1885)
Member	Party	Term
Sir Charles Lilley		1 May 1860 – 25 November 1873 (as Hamlet of Fortitude Valley)
Sir Charles Lilley		25 November 1873 – 14 February 1874 (as Fortitude Valley)
Francis Beattie		25 February 1874 – 26 November 1878 (by-election)
Ratcliffe Pring		26 November 1878 – 28 May 1879
Francis Beattie		28 May 1879 – 16 April 1886 (by-election)

Two-member constituency (1885–1912)
Member	Party	Term
John McMaster	Ministerialist	14 September 1885 – 11 March 1899
Samuel Wood Brooks		1 May 1886 – 12 May 1888
John Watson	Ministerialist	12 May 1888 – 21 March 1896
Frank McDonnell	ALP	21 March 1896 – 18 May 1907
William Guy Higgs	ALP	11 March 1899 – 17 July 1901
John McMaster	Ministerialist	3 August 1901 (by-election) – 27 August 1904
David Bowman	ALP	27 August 1904 – 27 April 1912
John McMaster	Opposition	18 May 1907 – 5 February 1908
Peter McLachlan	ALP	5 February 1908 – 27 April 1912

Single-member constituency (1912–1960)
Term	Member	Party
27 April 1912 – 25 February 1916	David Bowman	Labor
1 April 1916 – 19 May 1933	Thomas Wilson	Labor
15 July 1933 – 4 October 1950	Samuel Brassington	Labor
18 November 1950 – 26 April 1957	Mick Brosnan	Labor
26 April 1957 – 3 August 1957	Mick Brosnan	Queensland Labor
3 August 1957 – 28 May 1960	Bob Windsor	Liberal

== See also ==
- Electoral districts of Queensland
- Members of the Queensland Legislative Assembly by year
- Category:Members of the Queensland Legislative Assembly by name
