= Abram Robertson Byram =

Australian politician

Abram Byram
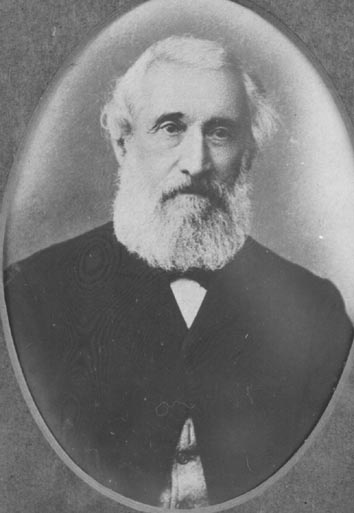

17th Mayor of Brisbane
- In office 1883–1883
- Preceded by: Robert Porter
- Succeeded by: John McMaster

Personal details
- Born: Abram Robertson Byram; 1825
- Died: 20 February 1893 (aged 67) Spring Hill, Queensland, Australia
- Resting place: Toowong Cemetery
- Spouse: Elizabeth Freeman Elliot (m.1848 d.1898)
- Occupation: Cabinetmaker

Abram Robertson Byram (died 1893) was an Australian cabinetmaker and politician. He served as alderman and mayor of Brisbane Municipal Council, Queensland, Australia.

== Personal life ==
Abram Robertson Byram was born about 1825, the son of James Cooper Byram and Mary Robertson. He married Elizabeth Freeman Elliot in Tynemouth, England in 1848. They had the following children in England:

- Maria Freeman Byram, born about 1850 Tynemouth, England, married 1872 in Rockhampton, Queensland to Willam James

Hartley

- William Elliot Byram, born 1851 in Tynemouth, England

Abram and his family immigrated to Sydney on the Parsee, arriving on 17 Jan 1853; William died on the voyage.

Daughter Elizabeth Byram was born in 1854 in New South Wales. She married Norman Meredith Davis in Brisbane in 1882 and died in Brisbane in 1920.

They had more children in Brisbane:

- William James Byram, born 1861. He died in 1922 in Queensland
- George Elliot Byram, born 1865. He died in 1875 in Queensland.

Abram Robertson Byram died at his home in Boundary Street, Spring Hill, Brisbane on 20 February 1893 aged 67. He is buried in Toowong Cemetery with his wife Elizabeth Freeman Byram and his sons George and William.

== Public life ==
Abram Robertson Byram served as alderman of the Brisbane Municipal Council from 1877 to 1888 and as mayor in 1883. He served on various committees:

- Improvement Committee 1879, 1881
- Legislative Committee 1879–1881, 1883
- Finance Committee 1878, 1880, 1882, 1887
- Works Committee 1883, 1888
- Health Committee 1888
- Town Hall Committee 1885, 1886.

== See also ==
- List of mayors and lord mayors of Brisbane
- Photo of Abram Robertson Byram, 1883
