= John James Kingsbury =

Australian politician

John Kingsbury
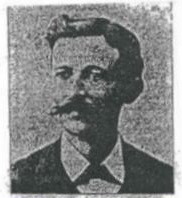

Member of the Queensland Legislative Assembly for Brisbane North
- In office 29 April 1893 – 21 March 1896 Serving with Thomas McIlwraith
- Preceded by: Samuel Griffith
- Succeeded by: Robert Fraser

Personal details
- Born: John James Kingsbury; 1853 Dublin, Ireland
- Died: 2 August 1939 (aged 85 or 86) Glen Iris, Victoria, Australia
- Party: Ministerialist
- Spouse: Elizabeth Jane Ham (m.1879 d.1919)
- Education: Trinity College, Dublin
- Occupation: Businessman, crown prosecutor

John James Kingsbury (1853 – 2 August 1939) was a crown prosecutor and member of the Queensland Legislative Assembly.

== Early years ==
Kingsbury was born and educated in Dublin, Ireland, graduating with a Master of Arts from Trinity College. He arrived in Melbourne, Australia in 1878 where he helped start up a business, Henry Brookes & Co. Kingsbury moved to Queensland in the 1880s as manager of Beale and Co. and in 1886 became a director of the Queensland Deposit Bank before returning to Ireland in 1887 for a year.

== Political career ==
For the 1893 Queensland elections, Kingsbury with his knowledge of finance, was asked to stand as a Ministerialist candidate alongside Thomas McIlwraith for the seat of Brisbane North. The pair were successful in the two member seat, convincingly defeating their opponents, Charles Lilley, Thomas Glassey and Nathaniel Raven.

Kingsbury held the seat until the 1896 elections, where he lost to Robert Fraser who also claimed to be a Ministerialist candidate. Whilst in politics, Kingsbury took up law and in 1896 was appointed Crown Prosecutor of the Supreme Court of Queensland.

== Personal life ==
Kingsbury married Elizabeth Jane Ham (died 1919), eldest daughter of David Ham of Ballarat, in November 1879 and together had three sons and one daughter. He was a former President of the Queensland Irish Association and played a leading part in the affairs on the Albert Street Methodist Church.

Kingsbury died in Glen Iris, Victoria, in August 1939.

Parliament of Queensland
Preceded by Samuel Griffith	Member for Brisbane; 1893–1896; Served alongside: Thomas McIlwraith	Succeeded by Robert Fraser
