= Frank McDonnell (Queensland politician) =

Australian politician

The Hon Frank McDonnell
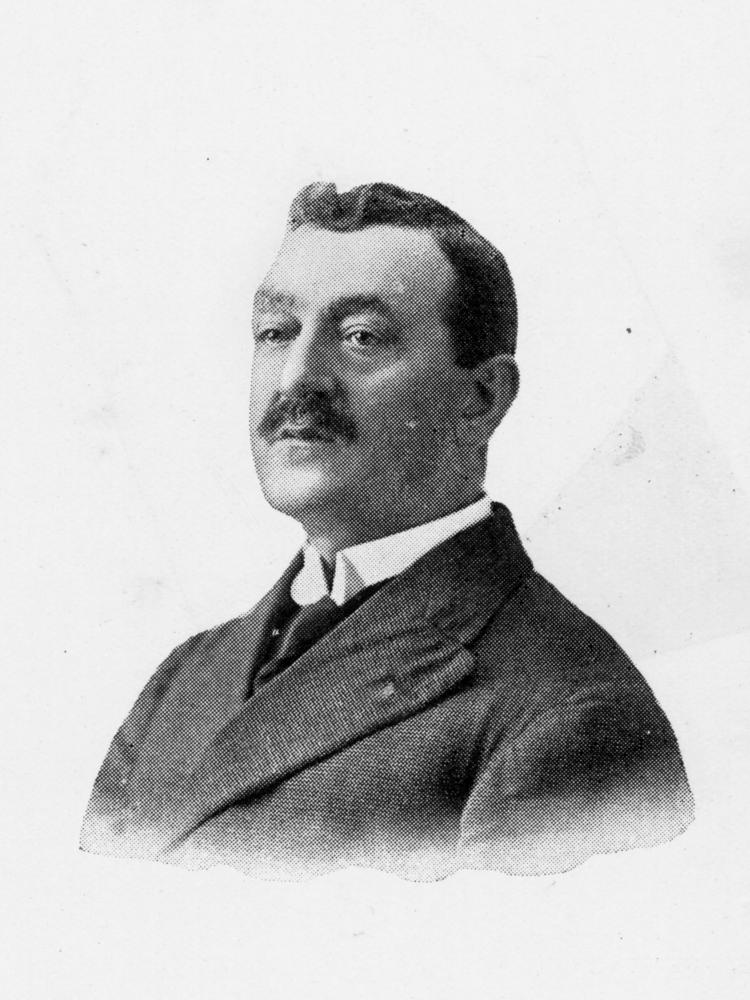

Member of the Queensland Legislative Assembly for Fortitude Valley
- In office 21 March 1896 – 18 May 1907 Serving with John McMaster, William Higgs, David Bowman
- Preceded by: John Watson
- Succeeded by: John McMaster

Member of the Queensland Legislative Council
- In office 3 July 1907 – 23 March 1922

Personal details
- Born: Francis McDonnell; 24 January 1863 Ennis, County Clare, Ireland
- Died: 26 November 1928 (aged 65) Brisbane, Queensland, Australia
- Resting place: Toowong Cemetery
- Party: Labour
- Spouse: Mary Heffernan (m.1890 d.1952)
- Occupation: Draper, Newspaper proprietor

Francis McDonnell (24 January 1863 – 26 November 1928) was a draper, and member of both the Queensland Legislative Council and the Queensland Legislative Assembly.

== Early years ==
McDonnell was born at Ennis, County Clare, Ireland, in 1863 to James McDonnell, a farmer, and his wife Elizabeth (née Bradish) and attended Ennis Christian Brothers School. At aged thirteen, he worked in a factory before returning to school and then in 1879 he was working for Gallagher Bros as an apprentice draper. By coincidence, a fellow employee was T.C. Beirne, who also went on to make a name for himself as a draper in Brisbane.

== Working career ==
Accompanied by his only sister, McDonnell arrived in Brisbane in 1886 and began work as a drapery assistant with Finney, Isles & Co., T. J. Geoghegan, and, from 1889 till 1896, Edwards & Lamb. In 1901, in partnership with Hubert East and with the financial backing of Peter Murphy, they established McDonnell & East, Drapers.

== Social activist and reformer ==
Frank McDonnell was a social activist and reformer who advocated for workers' rights, particularly shop assistants. He played a significant role in the Brisbane Early Closing Movement (ECM), an organization tied to labor history, the eight-hour day movement, and indirectly, the Temperance movement's efforts to regulate drinking habits.

In 1888, McDonnell helped organise the Shop Assistants' Early Closing Association (ECA) and published its newsletter, The Early Closing Advocate of Queensland, featuring articles by William Lane. Initially, the Early Closing Movement encouraged shoppers to buy earlier in the day. In 1891, while working as a draper's assistant, McDonnell participated in a Royal Commission investigating shop working conditions, particularly early closing. Despite recommendations for early closing, the commission's report was shelved.

As a Labour candidate, McDonnell contested the seat of Fortitude Valley in the 1893 colonial election, losing to Ministerialists John Watson and John McMaster. Elected to the Legislative Assembly in 1896, he repeatedly attempted to pass Early Closing Bills. Success came in 1898, leading to early closing legislation effective 1 January 1901.

In recognition of McDonnell's work for the Early Closing movement, an impressive illuminated address was awarded to him by the Brisbane Early Closing Association, 25 April 1901, now held by the State Library of Queensland.

== Political life ==
McDonnell stood for the seat of Fortitude Valley at the 1896 election, polling enough votes to finish second to John McMaster in the two-member electorate, and therefore winning a seat. He remained a member of the Legislative Assembly for the next eleven years, declining to stand at the 1907 election.

Within three months of his retirement from the Assembly in 1907, McDonnell was appointed by the Kidston ministry to the Queensland Legislative Council. He remained a member until 1922 when the council was abolished.

== Personal life ==
McDonnell married Mary Heffernan in 1890 and together they had seven children. He died in 1928, and his funeral was held at St Stephen's Cathedral and proceeded to the Toowong Cemetery for his burial.

Parliament of Queensland
Preceded by John Watson	Member for Fortitude Valley; 1896–1907; Served alongside: John McMaster, William Higgs, David Bowman	Succeeded by John McMaster
