= John Allworth Clark =

John Clark
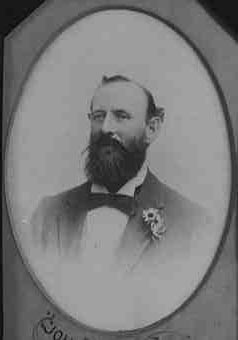
- John Allworth Clark - 1898

23rd Mayor of Brisbane
- In office 1891–1891
- Preceded by: John McMaster
- Succeeded by: George Watson

Personal details
- Born: John Allworth Clark; 1846 Adelaide, South Australia, Australia
- Died: 14 June 1932 (aged 85 or 86) Stanmore, New South Wales, Australia
- Spouse: Elizabeth Ann Jane Mullarky (m.1871)
- Occupation: Tailor

John Allworth Clark (1846–1932) was mayor of Brisbane, Queensland, Australia in 1891.

== Personal life ==
John Allworth Clark was born in 1846 in Adelaide, South Australia.

After completing his education, he moved to Sydney where he married Elizabeth Ann Jane Mullarky in 1871. Born in 1843, she was three years older than him. She remembered the imperial troops in Sydney where she was born, and the first railway to Parramatta.

The couple had the following children:

- Adelaide Louise, married Perth 1905 to Wesley Castles, died Sydney 1949
- May Helen, born Sydney 1877, married Sydney 1910 to Walter Gibson, died Sydney 1966
- John Raymond (Ray), born Sydney 1875 died Sydney 1954
- Stanley Richardson, born Sydney 1878, died Sydney 1964.

About 1882 they moved to Brisbane and then many years later back to Sydney.

John Allworth Clark died on Tuesday 14 June 1932 at his home, 233 Stanmore Road, Stanmore, Sydney, New South Wales. He was cremated on Wed 15 June 1932 at Rookwood Crematorium. Eliza Clark had died at 86 years old in 1929.

== Business life ==
John Allworth Clark was a wool importer and merchant tailor. Together with his father and brother, he owned menswear shops in Brisbane, Toowoomba and Sydney.

== Public life ==
John Allworth Clark was an alderman representing the North Ward of the Brisbane Municipal Council from 1889 to 1898. Eliza Clark was also active in public life as a suffragist and philanthropist. He was mayor in 1891. He served on the following committees:

- Finance Committee 1889, 1892, 1894, 1896
- Health Committee 1889, 1891, 1893, 1895, 1897–1898
- Works Committee 1890, 1891, 1893, 1895, 1897, 1898
- Legislative Committee 1890, 1892, 1894, 1896
- Street Lighting Committee 1891, 1892
- Served on Parks Committee 1897, 1898

He was a long-time staunch supporter of the temperance movement and a member of temperance organisations such as the Blue Ribbon Association.

In 1887 he was appointed secretary of the Anti-Chinese League.

Whilst mayor, Clark served as a line umpire in an 1891 intercolonial rugby union match between Queensland and New South Wales.

From 1892, he was an active promoter of Bowkett Societies, which were non-profit building societies that provided interest-free loans to their members.

In 1893, the Brisbane River had a major flood and Clark was chairman of the Flood Relief Committee, which collected and distributed financial aid to the flood victims.

He was a founding member of the board of the Victoria Bridge, Brisbane after its reconstruction in 1897.

From 1893 to at least 1898 he was chairman of the Metropolitan Transit Commission.

In 1894 Clark proposed that women should be allowed to serve as aldermen in the Brisbane Municipal Council.

Later after the family had moved to Sydney, Clark was also an alderman of the Petersham Municipal Council in Sydney in 1914, 1920 & 1922 representing the South Kingston ward.

== Memorials ==
Clark Lane (which runs between Queen Street and Anne Street in the Petrie Bight area of Brisbane) is named after John Allworth Clark. The lane was originally the northern end of Eagle Street, which commenced at Creek Street (as it still does today), ran along the river at Petrie Bight (now Queen Street) to the intersection with Adelaide Street and then north towards Ann Street (now Clark Lane). John Allworth Clark had one of his business premises on the intersection where Clark Lane converges with Adelaide and Queen Streets.

== See also ==
- List of mayors and lord mayors of Brisbane
