= George Watson (mayor) =

Mayor of Brisbane (1892)

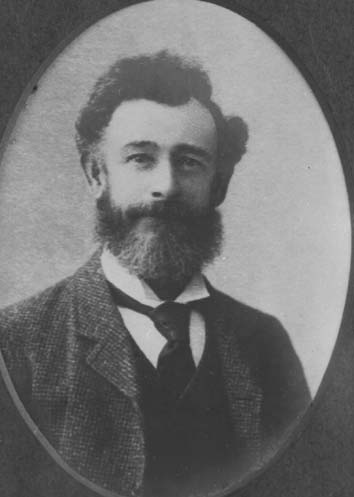
- George Watson - 1892

24th Mayor of Brisbane
- In office 1892–1892
- Preceded by: John Allworth Clark
- Succeeded by: John McMaster

Personal details
- Born: George Watson; 11 April 1852 Glasgow, Scotland
- Died: 21 June 1923 (aged 71) Brisbane, Queensland, Australia
- Resting place: Toowong Cemetery
- Spouse: Harriett Barnes (m.1877 d.1926)
- Occupation: Plumber

George Watson (1852–1923) was mayor of Brisbane, Queensland, Australia in 1892.

== Personal life ==
George Watson was born in Glasgow, Scotland on 11 April 1852, the son of George Watson, senior, and his wife Elizabeth (née Lindsay). Aged 10 years old, he immigrated to Brisbane on the ship Ocean Chief with his father. He attended the Brisbane Normal School.

George Watson married Harriett Barnes, daughter of John Barnes and his wife Lydia (née Allwood), on 7 November 1877 in Brisbane. The couple had nine children:

- Elizabeth Lucy (1879–1949)
- Henry Thomas (1880–1883)
- James Francis (1882–1967)
- Gertrude Matilda (1884–1957, Mrs Whyte)
- Lydia Beatrice (1886–1960, Mrs Eldred)
- Daisy Lilian (1888–1978, Mrs Wyllie)
- Helen Evelyn (1889–1905)
- George (1891–1964)
- Norman Mayor (1893–1918)

Their son Norman Mayor Watson was a lance corporal in the Australian Imperial Forces in World War I and was killed in action on 5 April 1918. He was buried in Dernancourt Communal Cemetery Extension, near Albert, France.

George Watson died of pneumonia after a short illness on the evening of Thursday 21 June 1923. . He was buried in Toowong Cemetery. His widow Harriett died in 1926.

== Business life ==
At age 13 was apprenticed as a plumber to his father. When his father retired in 1880, the business was taken over by George and his brothers Thomas, James and John Douglas.

== Public life ==
George Watson was an alderman of Brisbane from 1891 to 1896 (East Ward) and was elected mayor on Saturday 6 February 1892. Due to the need for continuing leadership during severe flooding, his term was extended in 1893 (normally a new election for mayor would have occurred in early 1893).

He served on the following committees:

- Finance Committee 1891, 1893–95
- Legislative Committee 1891, 1893–95
- Works Committee 1892, 1896
- Health Committee 1892
- Street Lighting Committee 1892
- Parks Committee 1896

Perhaps reflecting his trade as a plumber, George Watson was passionate about the importance of introducing a sewerage system into Brisbane.

== See also ==
- List of mayors and lord mayors of Brisbane
