= Elena Arellano Chamorro =

Nicaraguan pedagogue and nun (1836–1911)

Elena Arellano Chamorro (November 3, 1836, Granada – October 11, 1911, Granada), or better known as "Mother Elena Arellano", was recognized for her selflessness and dedication to women's education in Nicaragua.

== Biography ==
Elena Arellano Chamorro was born in the city of Granada, Nicaragua, on November 3, 1836. She was the daughter of Narciso Arellano del Castillo, who served as Prime Minister of Nicaragua. In 1842, after the death of her father, she made vows of chastity and poverty. As a result of these vows, Arellano took in any impoverished people in need of help into her home. As part of her apostolate, she founded la Casa de Huerfanas de Artes y Oficios (The Orphanage of Arts and Crafts), this center served widows, female victims of stalking, and prostitutes. In 1872, Arellano boarded young women in her home where they received a basic, elementary level education. This was the first college open to women in Nicaragua. In 1888, she traveled to Europe where she met with Pope Leon XIII and attended the funeral of Don Bosco. She also met with Francisca Javier Cabrini on this trip. In 1892, the city of Granada was affected by Alfombria (black smallpox) and Mother Elena took on the task of treating the sick in the quarantine hospitals created in the city.

== Foundations ==
In 1891, Mother Elena Arellano Chamorro founded el Colegio La Immaculada (The Immaculate School). In the same year, Francisco Javier Cabrini arrived in Nicaragua with eight nuns dedicated to teaching women in Mother Elena's newly created school. On August 20, 1894, General Jose Santos Zelaya expelled the religious group Salesas Misioneras del Sagrado Corazón de Jesús from Nicaragua and Mother Elena left the country with them. Upon her return to Nicaragua in 1895, she founded el Colegio San Luis Gonzaga (The San Luis Gonzaga School). This school was specifically for the education of young men. In 1903, Mother Elena prepared for the arrival of las Oblatas Del Sagrado Corazón, these women were in charge of el Colegio Nuestra Señora de Guadalupe (French school). In March 1912, el Colegio San Juan Bosco began operations under the management of los Salesianos. These Salesianos in charge of this institution were Father José Misieri, Father José Dini, Jorge Müller (student) and Brother Esteban Tosini.

== Death ==
Mother Elena Arellano died on October 11, 1911. Her remains were buried in the chapel of Maria Auxiliadora of the Salesiano School of Granada.

== National recognition ==
After protests by intellectuals in Granada, the city named a street after Elena Arellano.
