= Morgan ministry =

The Morgan Ministry was the 22nd ministry of the Government of Queensland and was led by Premier Arthur Morgan, who led a Liberal–Labour coalition.

It succeeded the First Philp Ministry on 17 September 1903 after Robert Philp's resignation following the defection of several Ministerialists on a key vote. Labour leader William Browne failed to form a ministry, and advised the Governor to send for the Speaker, Arthur Morgan. Morgan, who became leader of the Liberal faction in the Assembly, formed a coalition ministry containing two Labour members, Browne and William Kidston. Browne died on 12 April 1904 and was replaced in the Ministry by another Labour member, Peter Airey.

The Ministry was succeeded by the First Kidston ministry on 19 January 1906 after Morgan was appointed President of the Queensland Legislative Council.

== The Ministry ==
On 17 September 1903, the Governor, Herbert Chermside, designated eight principal executive offices of the Government, and appointed the following Members of the Parliament of Queensland to the Ministry as follows.

Office	Minister
Premier; Chief Secretary; Secretary for Railways	Arthur Morgan
Deputy Premier; Secretary for Public Instruction; Government Representative in the Legislative Council	Andrew Henry Barlow, MLC
Secretary for Mines; Secretary for Public Works	William Browne (until 12 April 1904)
Treasurer	William Kidston
Secretary for Public Lands	Joshua Thomas Bell
Attorney-General; Secretary for Mines (from 27 April 1904)	James Blair
Secretary for Agriculture; Home Secretary; Secretary for Public Works (from 27 April 1904)	Digby Denham
Minister without portfolio	Thomas O'Sullivan
Home Secretary	Peter Airey (from 27 April 1904)

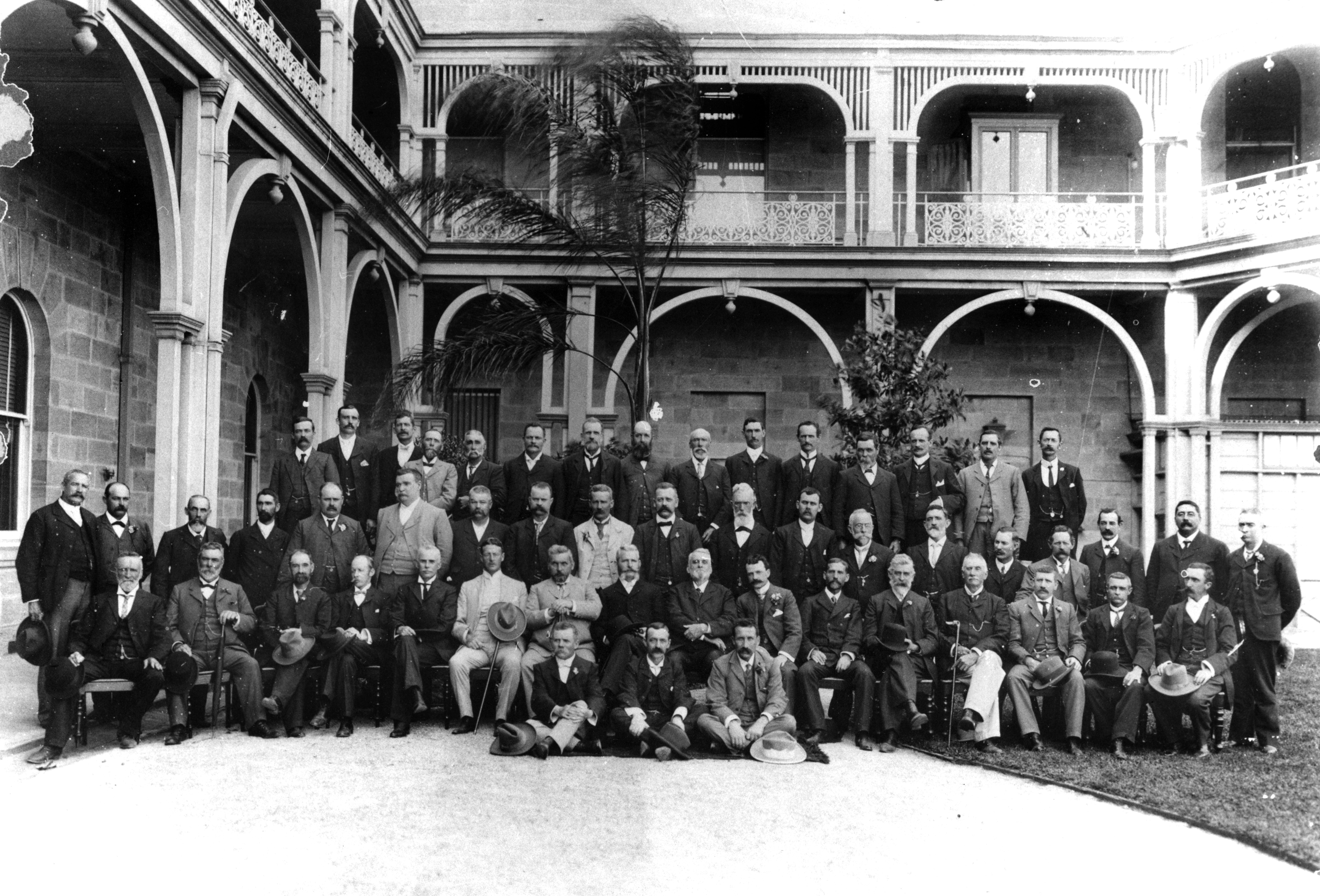
Back row: L to r: 1. F. Kenna; 2. J. Mann; 3. G.P. Barker; 4. G. Jackson; 5. J.A. Hargraves; 6. D. Bowman; 7. C.H.W. Reinhold;8. B. Herberton; 9. F. Greyson; 10. T.A. Scott; 11. A Ryland; 12. T. Bridges; 13. W.H. Ryott Maughan; 14. H.F. Hardacre; 15. J. Burrows.; Third row: L to r: 1. W. Hamilton; R.J. Hodge; 3. H.P. Somerset; T.W. Bouchard; 5. J. Tolmie; 6. D. Mulcany; 7. EM. Land; 8. J. O'Brien; 9. G. Martin; 10. G. Lindley; 11. W. Mitchell; 12. A.J. Jones; 13. H. Turner; 14. M. O'Keefe;; 15. T.A. Spencer; 16. A.J.W. Fudge; 17. V.B.J. Lesina; 18. W.S. Murphy. 19. M.J.R. Woods.; Second row: L to r: 1. T. Plunkett; D. Mackintosh; 3. G. Kerr. (LLP); Hon. P.A. Irey; 5. Hon. T.J. O'Sullivan; 6. Hon. J.J. Bell; 7. Hon. W. Kidson; 8. Hon. A. Morgan; 9. Hon. A.H. Barlow; 10: Hon. J.W. Blair; 11. Hon. D.F. Denham; 12. T. Dibley; 13: A.H.E. Barton; 14. H. Cowpar; 15. J.H. Dunsford; 16. C. F. Neilson.; Front row: L to r: 1. J. Norman; 2. F. McDonnell; 3. K.M. Grant.

Preceded by First Philp ministry	Morgan ministry 1903–1906	Succeeded by First Kidston ministry
