= Benjamin Harris Babbidge =

Alderman and mayor of Brisbane, Australia

Benjamin Babbidge
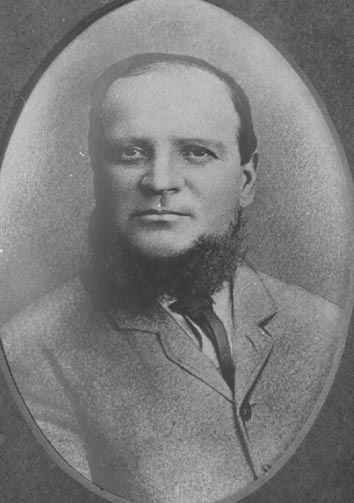

19th Mayor of Brisbane
- In office 1885–1885
- Preceded by: John McMaster
- Succeeded by: James Hipwood

Personal details
- Born: Benjamin Harris Babbidge; 2 October 1836 Newport, Isle of Wight, England
- Died: 19 February 1905 (aged 68) South Brisbane, Queensland, Australia
- Resting place: Toowong Cemetery
- Spouse: Elizabeth Ann Damp (m.1856 d.1916)
- Occupation: Blacksmith

Benjamin (Ben) Harris Babbidge (2 October 1836 – 19 February 1905) was an alderman and mayor of Brisbane, Queensland, Australia.

== Personal life ==
Benjamin Harris Babbidge was born on 2 October 1836 in Newport, Isle of Wight, Hampshire, England, the son of John Babbidge (a tailor ) and his wife Elizabeth (née Harris).

He married Elizabeth Ann Damp, the daughter of George and Jane Damp, on the Isle of Wight in 1856. Soon after their marriage they immigrated to Queensland on the "New Great Britain" arriving in Moreton Bay on 6 January 1857. The couple had the following children:

- Benjamin Harris. (b. 1857, m. 1878 Alice Jane Langridge, d. 1936)
- Elizabeth Ann (b. 1859, m. 1884 George Edward Ely, d. 1935)
- John George (b. 1861, m. 1884 Jane Elizabeth Smith)
- Arthur Harry (b. 1863, m. 1887 Harriet Jane Young, m. 1895 Catherine Maxwell, d. 1919)
- Julia Ann (b. 1865, d. 1865)
- Lilian (b. 1866, m. 1889 Paul Williams, d. 1949)
- Albert Ernest (b. 1868, m. 1895 Jessie Margaret Davies, d. 1926)
- Margaret Emily (b. 1871, d. 1873)
- Florence (b. 1873, m. 1890 George Williams, d. 1912)
- William Alfred (b. 1875, m. 1898 Annie Elizabeth Jane Maxwell, d. 1951)
- Edwin Edgar (b. 1877, d. 1908)
- Margaret (b. 1880, d. 1880)
- Charles Oliver (b. 1881, d. 1881)

They were residents of Newcastle, New South Wales for about three years from 1857 (their eldest two children, Benjamin and Elizabeth, were born there) after which they relocated to Moreton Bay.

Benjamin Harris Babbidge died on 19 February 1905 at Victoria Private Hospital at South Brisbane, following six months of poor health. His funeral left from his residence in Dauphin Terrace, Highgate Hill and he was buried in Toowong Cemetery.

== Business life ==
Benjamin Harris Babbidge was a blacksmith, having completed an apprenticeship with the shipbuilders J. & W. White of Cowes.

After three years in Newcastle, New South Wales, he relocated to Moreton Bay where he worked for John Petrie for a number of years. In 1865 he established his own business as a ship's smith.

In 1881 he successfully tendered to construct 25 goods wagons for the railways. This was a new line of business for him and he established a railway rolling stock workshop at Hope Street, South Brisbane for this purpose. In 1885, his workshop assembled Brisbane's first tram cars (the cars themselves being imported from America).

== Public life ==
Babbidge was an alderman of the Brisbane Municipal Council from 1879 to 1886. He was mayor in 1885. He served on the following council committees:

- Improvement Committee 1880
- Legislative Committee 1880, 1884, 1885
- Finance Committee 1881, 1883, 1886
- Works Committee 1882, 1884, 1885
- Health Committee 1885, 1886
- Town Hall Committee 1885, 1886

He left the Brisbane Municipal Council when he was defeated by William Stephens in the 1887 election for the south ward.

He was also an alderman of the South Brisbane Municipal Council from 1900 to 1902, where he served on the following council committees:

- Works Committee 1900, 1902
- General Purpose Committee 1900, 1902
- Parks Committee 1900, 1902
- Finance Committee 1901

He retired from politics in 1903, following his defeat in the 1903 elections for the South Brisbane council.

In addition to his council roles, he was also a member of:

- the Provisional Committee of the Proposed Technical College (1882)
- the Fire Brigade Board in Brisbane in 1884
- the Licensing Board in Brisbane in 1885
- the United Municipalities (president in 1886)
- the Anti-Chinese Committee (member 1886)
- the Brisbane Workman's Club (director 1886)
- the Victoria Bridge Board in 1902
- the Brisbane and Suburban Shopkeepers' Association (president 1902–1904)

== See also ==
- List of mayors and lord mayors of Brisbane
- Newspaper articles & other items related to Benjamin Harris Babbidge
