= Robert Woods Thurlow =

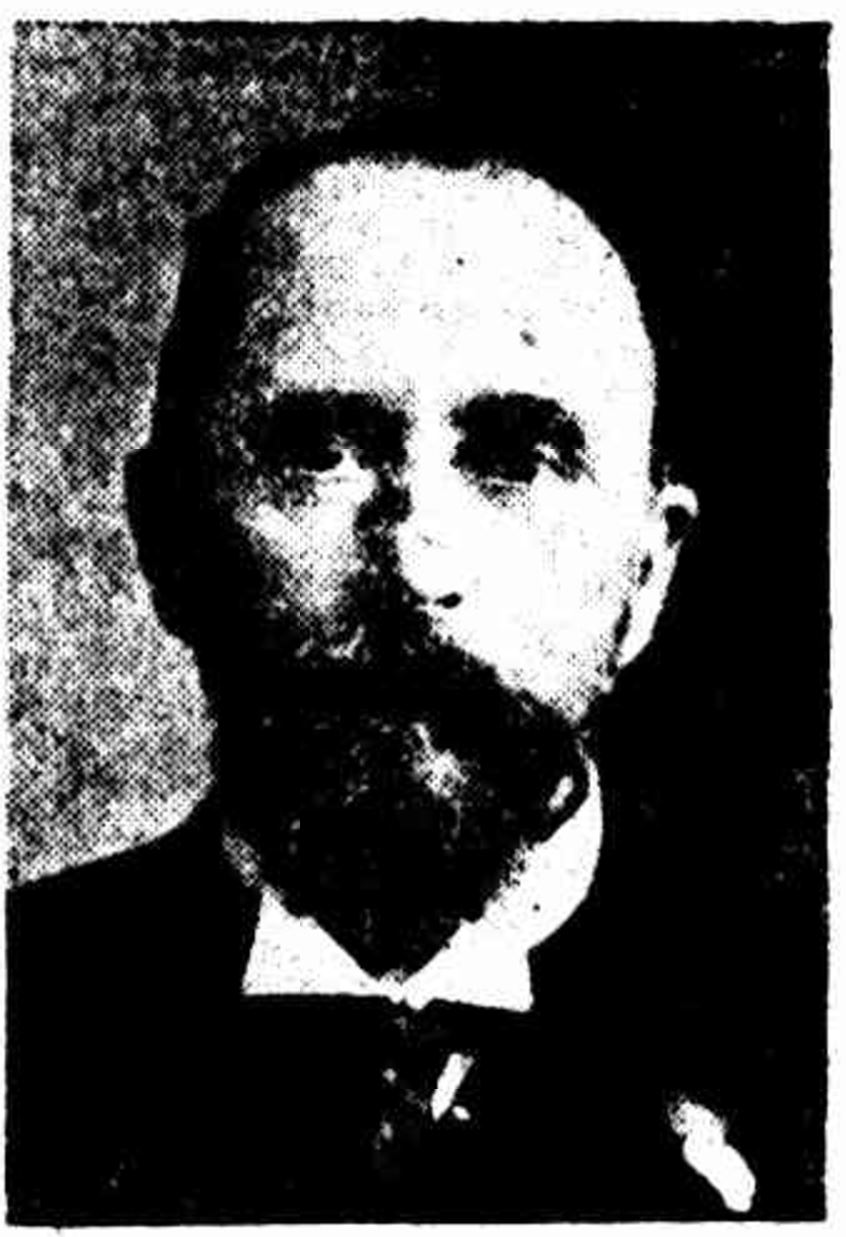
Robert Woods Thurlow Mayor of Brisbane

Robert Woods Thurlow (28 January 1855 – 24 February 1913) was a businessman and politician in Brisbane, Queensland, Australia. He was Mayor of Brisbane in 1896.

He died during his return trip to Brisbane from Melbourne. He was returning via Sydney in the Melbourne Express. After a sudden seizure, and on arrival at Sydney he was moved to Nurse Munro's Private Hospital located in Redfern. He had another stroke on Monday afternoon, and died in the evening.
