= Micajah Autry =

American merchant, poet and lawyer

Micajah Autry (1793 – March 6, 1836) was an American merchant, poet and lawyer who died in the Texas Revolution at the Battle of the Alamo.

From Natchitoches, Louisiana, on December 13 he wrote: "About 20 men from Tennessee formed our squad.... [T]he war [in Texas] is still going on favorably to the Texans, but it is thought that Santa Anna will make a descent with his whole force in the Spring, but there will be soldiers enough of the real grit in Texas by that time to overrun all of Mexico.... We have between 400 and 500 miles to foot it to the seat of government, for we cannot get horses, but we have sworn allegiance to each other and will get along somehow."

After a siege lasting 13 days, Autry was killed with the rest of the Alamo garrison after the Mexican army stormed it on March 6, 1836. Among some of his possessions now housed at the Alamo in San Antonio, Texas, is an eagle approximately 3 feet high which he carved. They also have a collection of his letters and poetry written to his beloved wife.

== See also ==
- Davy Crockett
- Antonio López de Santa Anna
- Alamo Mission in San Antonio

== Sources ==
- "Micajah Autry, A Soldier of the Alamo," Adele B. Looscan, Southwestern Historical Quarterly, April 1911.
- James Lockhart Autry Papers, Woodson Research Center, Fondren Library, Rice University, Houston, Texas.
- 100 Days in Texas: The Alamo Letters, Wallace O. Chariton, Plano, Texas: Wordware Publishing, Inc., 1989.
