= Members of the Queensland Legislative Assembly, 1899–1902 =

This is a list of members of the 13th Legislative Assembly of Queensland from 1899 to 1902, as elected at the 1899 election held between 1 March 1899 and 25 March 1899 (due to problems of distance and communications, it was not possible to hold the elections on a single day).

Name	Party	Electorate	Term in office
Peter Airey^{[16]}	Labour	Flinders	1901–1907; 1908–1909
John Annear	Ministerial	Maryborough	1884–1902
William Drayton Armstrong	Ministerial	Lockyer	1893–1904; 1907–1918
George Barber^{[13]}	Labour	Bundaberg	1901–1935
Walter Barnes^{[7]}	Ministerial	Bulimba	1901–1915; 1918–1933
John Bartholomew	Ministerial	Maryborough	1896–1902
Joshua Thomas Bell	Ministerial	Dalby	1893–1911
Jason Boles	Opposition	Port Curtis	1893–1904
David Bowman^{[3]}	Labour	Warrego	1899–1902; 1904–1916
Thomas Bridges	Ministerial	Nundah	1896–1907; 1909–1918
William Browne	Labour	Croydon	1893–1904
John Burrows^{[14]}	Labour	Charters Towers	1901–1907
Albert Callan	Ministerial	Fitzroy	1889–1902
John Cameron^{[17]}	Ministerial	Brisbane North	1893–1896; 1901–1908
John Dunmore Campbell^{[1]}	Ministerial	Moreton	1899–1909
James Chataway^{[9]}	Ministerial	Mackay	1893–1901
Alfred Cowley	Ministerial	Herbert	1888–1907
James Cribb	Ministerial	Bundamba	1893–1896; 1899–1915
Thomas Bridson Cribb	Ministerial	Ipswich	1896–1904
George Curtis	Independent	Rockhampton	1893–1902
David Dalrymple	Ministerial	Mackay	1888–1904
Anderson Dawson^{[14]}	Labour	Charters Towers	1893–1901
Thomas Dibley	Labour	Woolloongabba	1896–1907
Hon. James Dickson^{[7]}	Ministerial	Bulimba	1873–1888; 1892–1901
James Drake^{[4]}	Opposition	Enoggera	1888–1899
John Dunsford	Labour	Charters Towers	1893–1905
Thomas Finney^{[6]}	Ministerial	Toowong	1896–1900
Andrew Fisher^{[10]}	Labour	Gympie	1893–1896; 1899–1901
Charles Fitzgerald	Labour	Mitchell	1896–1902
John Fogarty	Opposition	Drayton and Toowoomba	1893–1904
Edward Barrow Forrest^{[1]}	Ministerial	Brisbane North	1899–1912
James Forsythe	Ministerial	Carpentaria	1899–1907; 1909–1918
George Fox^{[8]}	Ministerial	Normanby	1877–1878; 1901–1914
Justin Foxton	Ministerial	Carnarvon	1883–1904
Thomas Givens	Labour	Cairns	1899–1902
Thomas Glassey^{[5]}^{[13]}	Labour	Bundaberg	1888–1893; 1894–1901
Samuel Grimes	Ministerial	Oxley	1878–1902
William Henry Groom^{[11]}	Opposition	Drayton and Toowoomba	1862–1901
John Hamilton	Ministerial	Cook	1878–1904
William Hamilton	Labour	Gregory	1899–1915
Patrick Hanran	Ministerial	Townsville	1899–1909
Herbert Hardacre	Labour	Leichhardt	1893–1919
William Higgs^{[15]}	Labour	Fortitude Valley	1899–1901
William Hood^{[3]}	Ministerial	Warrego	1898–1899
George Jackson	Labour	Kennedy	1893–1909
Charles Moffatt Jenkinson	Opposition	Wide Bay	1898–1902; 1903–1909
Francis Kates	Ind./Min.	Cunningham	1878–1881; 1883–1888; 1899–1903
William Kent	Ministerial	Burnett	1899–1904
Denis Keogh	Labour	Rosewood	1896–1902; 1904–1911
George Kerr	Labour	Barcoo	1893–1909
William Kidston	Labour	Rockhampton	1896–1911
John Leahy	Independent	Bulloo	1893–1909
Vincent Lesina	Labour	Clermont	1899–1912
John Linnett^{[12]}	Independent	North Rockhampton	1901–1902
Frederick Lord	Ministerial	Stanley	1893–1902
Abraham Luya^{[2]}	Ministerial	South Brisbane	1888–1893; 1899
Edward Macartney^{[6]}	Ministerial	Toowong	1900–1908; 1909–1920
Charles McDonald^{[16]}	Labour	Flinders	1893–1901
Thomas Macdonald-Paterson^{[17]}	Ministerial	Brisbane North	1878–1885; 1896–1901
Frank McDonnell	Labour	Fortitude Valley	1896–1907
Donald MacKintosh	Ministerial	Cambooya	1899–1915
John McMaster^{[15]}	Ministerial	Fortitude Valley	1885–1899; 1901–1904; 1907–1908
William Maxwell	Labour	Burke	1899–1909
William Moore	Ministerial	Murilla	1898–1904; 1907–1909
Arthur Morgan	Ministerial	Warwick	1887–1896; 1898–1906
Daniel Mulcahy^{[10]}	Labour	Gympie	1901–1912
John Murray^{[8]}	Ministerial	Normanby	1888–1901
John Newell	Ministerial	Woothakata	1896–1902
William O'Connell	Ministerial	Musgrave	1888–1903
Walter Paget^{[9]}	Ministerial	Mackay	1901–1915
Andrew Lang Petrie	Ministerial	Toombul	1893–1926
Robert Philp	Ministerial	Townsville	1886–1915
Thomas Plunkett	Opposition	Albert	1888–1896; 1899–1908
Matthew Reid^{[4]}	Labour	Enoggera	1893–1896; 1899–1902
Arthur Rutledge	Ministerial	Maranoa	1878–1893; 1899–1904
George Ryland	Labour	Gympie	1899–1912
Robert Harrison Smith	Ministerial	Bowen	1888–1902
William Stephens	Ministerial	South Brisbane	1888–1904; 1907–1908
Alfred John Stephenson	Ministerial	Ipswich	1896–1902
James Stewart^{[12]}	Labour	North Rockhampton	1896–1901
James Stodart	Ministerial	Logan	1896–1918
George Story	Ministerial	Balonne	1896–1904
George Thorn	Ministerial	Fassifern	1867–1874; 1876–1878; 1879–1883; 1887–1888; 1893–1902
William Thorn	Opposition	Aubigny	1894–1904; 1908–1912
James Tolmie^{[11]}	Ind. Min.	Drayton and Toowoomba	1901–1907; 1909–1918
Nicholas Tooth	Ministerial	Burrum	1893–1902
Henry Turley^{[2]}	Labour	South Brisbane	1893–1899; 1899–1902
Henry Turner^{[12]}	Labour	North Rockhampton	1901, 1902–1907

== See also ==
- Premier:

Anderson Dawson (Labour) (1899) — 6 days
Robert Philp (Ministerial) (1899–1903)

== Notes ==
^{1} Edward Barrow Forrest and John Dunmore Campbell, the newly elected Ministerial members for Brisbane North and Moreton, were members of the Marine Board and were claimed to have held an office of profit under the Crown. They therefore resigned their seats to contest them at a by-election, and were returned unopposed on 20 April 1899 (Melbourne Argus, 14 April 1899, p. 6).
^{2} On 6 July 1899, one of the Ministerial members for South Brisbane, Abraham Luya, died. Labour candidate and former member Henry Turley won the resulting by-election on 22 July 1899.
^{3} At the 1899 election, William Hood had been returned by a one-vote majority in Warrego. His sole opponent, Labour candidate David Bowman, filed a petition against his return and on 21 November 1899, the election was declared void. Bowman won the resulting by-election on 16 December 1899 with a majority of 44 votes.
^{4} On 7 December 1899, James Drake, the Opposition member for Enoggera, was appointed to the Queensland Legislative Council. Labour candidate Matthew Reid won the resulting by-election on 23 December 1899.
^{5} Thomas Glassey, elected as the Labour member for Bundaberg, resigned from the party and his seat in 1900. He won the resulting by-election against a Labour opponent on 14 July 1900.
^{6} On 5 October 1900, Thomas Finney, the Ministerial member for Toowong, resigned. Ministerial candidate Edward Macartney won the resulting by-election on 24 November 1900.
^{7} On 10 January 1901, James Dickson, the Ministerial member for Bulimba, died. Ministerial candidate Walter Barnes won the resulting by-election on 16 February 1901.
^{8} On 1 March 1901, John Murray, the Ministerial member of Normanby, resigned. Ministerial candidate George Fox won the resulting by-election on 13 April 1901.
^{9} On 12 April 1901, James Chataway, the Ministerial member for Mackay, died. Ministerial candidate Walter Paget won the resulting by-election on 25 May 1901.

Federal election

The first federal election was held on 30 March 1901. Unlike later elections, nobody resigned from their seats to contest it, but those who got elected to the federal parliament subsequently resigned their Assembly seats. This triggered a series of by-elections:

^{10} Andrew Fisher, Labour member for Gympie, became the member for the Federal division of Wide Bay, and resigned his Assembly seat on 9 May 1901. Labour candidate Daniel Mulcahy won the resulting by-election on 8 June 1901.
^{11} William Henry Groom, Opposition member for Drayton and Toowoomba, became the member for the Federal division of Darling Downs and resigned his Assembly seat on 4 June 1901. Independent Ministerialist candidate James Tolmie won the resulting by-election on 22 June 1901.
^{12} James Stewart, the Labour member for North Rockhampton, became a Senator for Queensland and resigned his Assembly seat on 5 June 1901. Labour candidate Henry Turner won the resulting by-election on 22 June 1901 with a majority of one vote. This result was set aside upon petition on 17 October 1901 and Independent candidate John Linnett was declared elected without a further by-election.
^{13} Thomas Glassey, the Independent member for Bundaberg, became a Senator for Queensland and resigned his Assembly seat on 22 June 1901. Labour candidate George Barber won the resulting by-election on 6 July 1901.
^{14} Anderson Dawson, the Labour member for Charters Towers, became a Senator for Queensland and resigned his Assembly seat on 11 June 1901. Labour candidate John Burrows won the resulting by-election on 6 July 1901.
^{15} William Higgs, the Labour member for Fortitude Valley, became a Senator for Queensland and resigned his Assembly seat on 17 July 1901. Ministerial candidate John McMaster won the resulting by-election on 27 July 1901.
^{16} Charles McDonald, the Labour member for Flinders, became the member for the Federal division of Kennedy, and resigned his Assembly seat on 24 June 1901. Labour candidate Peter Airey won the resulting by-election on 3 August 1901.
^{17} Thomas Macdonald-Paterson, the Ministerial member for Brisbane North, became the member for the Federal division of Brisbane and resigned his Assembly seat on 31 July 1901. Ministerial candidate John Cameron won the resulting by-election on 6 August 1901.
