= Matthew Battersby =

Australian politician (1841–1899)

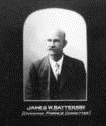

Member of the Queensland Legislative Assembly for Moreton
- In office 17 May 1888 – 18 March 1899
- Preceded by: Hiram Wakefield
- Succeeded by: John Campbell

Personal details
- Born: Matthew Roberton Battersby; 18 December 1841 Perth, Scotland
- Died: 15 May 1899 (aged 57) Brisbane, Queensland, Australia
- Resting place: Caboolture Cemetery
- Spouse(s): Jane Stewart (m.1861 d.1892), Davina Pope Melville (m.1893 d.1922)
- Occupation: Blacksmith

Matthew Roberton Battersby (18 December 1841 – 15 May 1899) was a politician in Queensland, Australia.

== Early life ==
Battersby was born in Perth, Scotland, the son of Andrew Battersby and Elizabeth Gloag. He immigrated from Scotland to Queensland 1865 where continued his trade as a blacksmith until he settled on a property in Caboolture. He had two sons and three daughters.

== Politics ==
Battersby was a member of the Caboolture Divisional Board for 9 years.

Battersby elected as a member of the Queensland Legislative Assembly in the electorate of Moreton on 17 May 1888 during the 1888 Queensland colonial election. He was re-elected unopposed in the 1893 election and won the 1896 election. However, he lost the seat on 18 March 1899 to John Dunmore Campbell in the 1899 election.

== Later life ==
On 15 May 1899, Battersby died suddenly at his home in Eagle Junction, Brisbane, from a rupture of an artery to the brain. Although his death was sudden, he had been suffering a complication of diseases for some time.

== See also ==
- Members of the Queensland Legislative Assembly, 1888–1893; 1893–1896; 1896–1899

Parliament of Queensland
Preceded by Hiram Wakefield	Member for Moreton; 1888 – 1899	Succeeded by John Campbell
