= Thomas Welsby =

Australian businessman, writer and sportsman

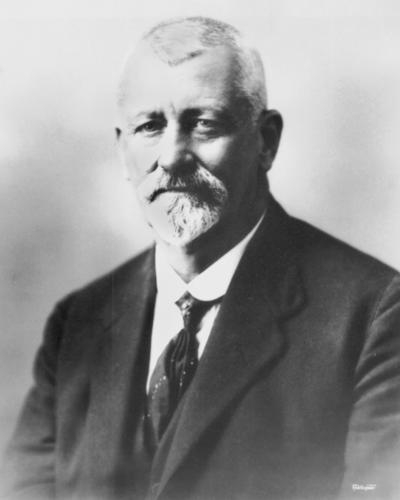

Member of the Queensland Legislative Assembly for Brisbane North
- In office 16 September 1911 – 27 April 1912 Serving with Edward Forrest
- Preceded by: Edward Macartney
- Succeeded by: Seat abolished

Member of the Queensland Legislative Assembly for Merthyr
- In office 27 April 1912 – 22 May 1915
- Preceded by: New seat
- Succeeded by: Peter McLachlan

Personal details
- Born: Thomas Welsby; 29 November 1858 Ipswich, Colony of New South Wales
- Died: 3 February 1941 (aged 82) New Farm, Brisbane, Queensland, Australia
- Resting place: Toowong Cemetery
- Party: Ministerialist
- Spouse: Margaret Gilchrist Kingston (d. 1903)
- Occupation: Clerk, Accountant, Company director

Thomas Welsby (29 November 1858 – 3 February 1941) was an Australian businessman, author, politician, and sportsman based in Queensland. He was a Member of the Queensland Legislative Assembly from 1911 to 1915.

== Early life ==
Born in Ipswich, Queensland in 1858, Welsby was the fourth of ten children of William Welsby and Hannah Welsby (née Billsbrough.) His parents migrated from Cornwall, England to Moreton Bay three years earlier in 1855. He was educated at Mr John Scott's school and Ipswich Boys' Grammar School. In his senior year he won prizes in history, arithmetic and Latin. As a child, Welsby aspired to study medicine at Sydney University; however this became impossible following the death of his father in 1874. The loss of his father caused the Welsby family to sell their substantial house in Ipswich and move to Brisbane. He started his working life in June 1874 at age 15 with the Bank of New South Wales in Brisbane and remained there for five years until a conflict with a manager (who he described as "imported" from Sydney) caused him to resign. In May 1879, he took up a post with the Australian Joint Stock Bank. In July 1885 at age 25, he left his employment at the Bank to commence practice as a public accountant in Brisbane.

Welsby married Margaret Gilchrist, née Kingston on 21 February 1893 at East Brisbane. Margaret died ten years later and Welsby never remarried. They had three children; a son who died in childhood and two daughters.

== Business career ==
Welsby's business success was helped immeasurably by his affable nature and his personal popularity. He fully exploited the personal associations that he had formed during his time as a banker. His banking experience also gave him a detailed understanding of the Queensland economy and the affairs of many of the major business concerns in the Colony. After leaving the Bank, he briefly became a member of the Brisbane Stock Exchange but within a few months he opened an office as an accountant, trustee and auditor. He subsequently was engaged to audit the financial statements of the Brisbane Town Council. At that time the position of auditor was an elective one with a £60 fee and he remained in the position for ten years.

In 1885, Welsby formed a partnership with Captain George Wallace to operate maritime ventures. The business undertook to do survey work and make coal sales. A substantial part of the business was the recovery of cargo from wrecked vessels. Welsby became a leading figure in the Brisbane establishment of the day. This was reflected in his appointment to the boards of a variety of leading Brisbane companies including the Engineering Supply Company of Australia and the Royal Bank of Queensland. His board career culminated with his appointment as the Chairman of Directors of Queensland Brewery Ltd in 1907. The last appointment established him as one of Brisbane's elite.

== Political career ==
Welsby was a candidate for the Queensland Legislative Assembly in the electoral district of Fortitude Valley in 1899, 1902 and 1909 elections but was unsuccessful.

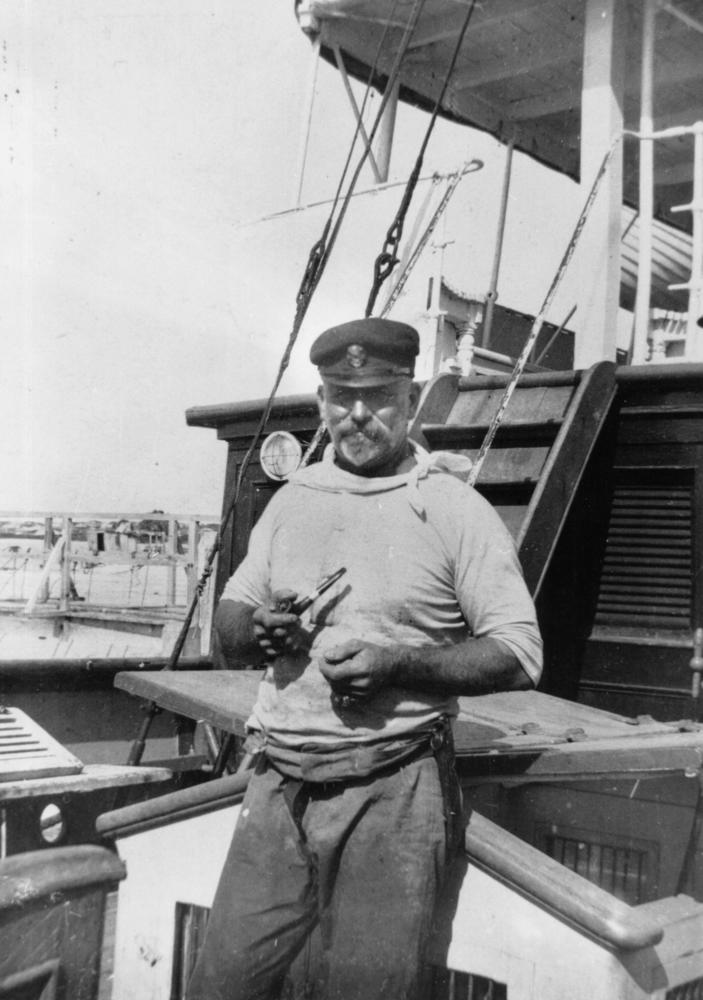
Tom Weslby on board the vessel, Bearen on the South Passage

On 30 August 1911, Richard John Cottell, the Ministerial member for Toowong, died. The Secretary for Public Lands and member for Brisbane North, Edward Macartney, resigned on 5 September. By-elections for both seats were held on 16 September 1911, with Macartney switching to Toowong, allowing Thomas Welsby to win Brisbane North as a Ministerialist.

In the 1912 election, Welsby was a candidate for the newly created seat of Merthyr and was elected on 27 April 1912. However, he subsequently lost his seat on 22 May 1915 when the Ryan Labor Government won the 1915 election.

Welsby was by no means a natural politician. Although his magnetic personality and sharp intellect drew people to him, the daily intrigue and backstabbing of politics was anathema to him. Nevertheless, he was able to make his mark on the parliament by advancing the causes of the Ipswich railway workshops, the transformation of St Helena Island in Moreton Bay into a recreational park, and by advocating that the Brisbane Tramways Company be acquired and operated by the government.

== Historian ==
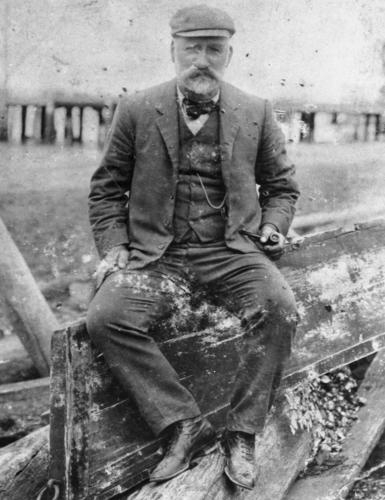
Thomas Welsby

It is for his literary works, particularly his histories of Moreton Bay, that Welsby is perhaps best known. Welsby was an intellectual, a polymath and a voracious reader and collector of books. Born only 35 years after the Brisbane River was first seen by Europeans, he was acutely aware of the dramatic growth and development of Queensland that was occurring around him and the need to record these events in writing. He helped to found the Historical Society of Queensland in 1913 and later became its president. Upon his death, he bequeathed to the Society a vast library of books that he had accumulated throughout his life.

Welsby was able to record contemporary history and also consumed writing on the subject by others. He was also born early enough to talk to a few eyewitnesses to the earliest days of Moreton Bay and to many others who were only one generation removed.

One of the achievements of his writings was to flesh out much of the detail that was omitted by other historians. Welsby had great knowledge of Moreton Bay and its environs. He had travelled personally to almost every part of the region and was particularly knowledgeable of the Bay Islands which he spent a lifetime exploring in a succession of yachts.

=== Literary style ===
Welsby writes in a relaxed, easy-to-read conversational style. His style can seem almost journalistic at times, though this is understandable as much of his published material originally appeared in newspapers.

== Sportsman ==
Welsby was a prolific sportsman, particularly in the field of Yachting, Fishing and Rugby Union.

As a footballer, Welsby was the manager and half-back for Queensland in the first inter-colonial match between Queensland and New South Wales. He was appointed a life member of the Queensland Rugby Union in 1928 and was its president from 1929 to 1939.

He was foundation secretary of the Brisbane Gymnasium in 1882 and in 1904 he became a foundation member of the Amateur Fishing Association. He sponsored boxing matches and formed the Queensland Amateur Boxing and Wrestling Union in 1909.

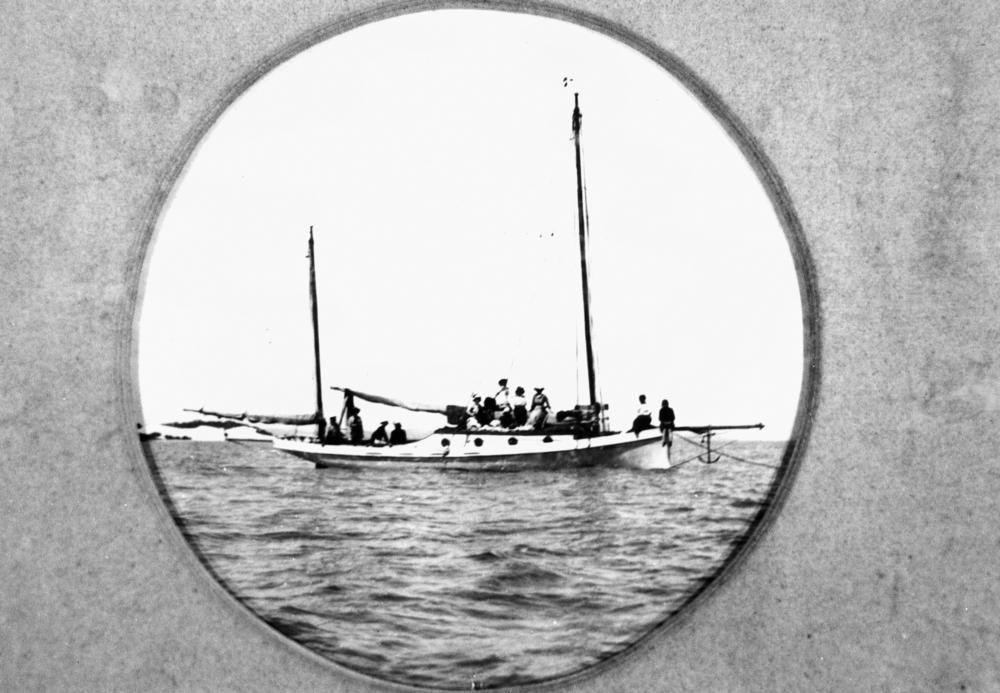
Welsby's motor launch Sunbeam

Perhaps his most important contribution to Queensland sport was the part that he played in the formation of the Brisbane Sailing Club which was later to become the Royal Queensland Yacht Squadron. Welsby was a passionate yachtsman and owned a number of boats over the years including Rip, Charm, Vagabond, Bohemian, Amity and the motor launch Sunbeam. He was Commodore of the Squadron between 1903 and 1909 and donated the Amity Cup. In 1918 he published "The History of the Royal Queensland Yacht Club."

== Later life ==
Welsby died in 1941 and was cremated. His ashes were later interred with his wife and son at Toowong Cemetery.

== Legacy ==
The locality of Welsby on Bribie Island was named after him.

The library of the Royal Historical Society of Queensland is named after him.

His residence Amity is listed on the Queensland Heritage Register.

== Published works ==
- Schnappering, 1905, (Outeridge Printing Company, Brisbane) is a rambling, humorous book that deals with fishing in Moreton Bay.
- Early Moreton Bay, 1907, (Outeridge Printing Company, Brisbane) deals mainly with yachting and shipwrecks in the Bay.
- The Discoverers of the Brisbane River, 1913, (H.J. Diddams & Co, Brisbane) deals with the discovery of the River by Matthew Flinders, the Glasshouse Mountains and the HMS Bounty mutiny.
- Memories of Amity, 1922, (Watson Ferguson, Brisbane) is a historical book focusing on Stradbroke Island. The book comprises twelve articles previously published in the Moreton Bay Courier newspaper.
- Sport and Pastime in Moreton Bay, 1931 (Simpson, Halligan and co., Brisbane) deals further with fishing and sport in the Bay.
- Bribie the Basket Maker, 1937, (Barker's Bookstores, Brisbane) deals with the convict "Bribie" and Bribie Island

Parliament of Queensland
Preceded by Edward Macartney	Member for Brisbane North; 1911 - 1912; Served alongside: Edward Forrest	Abolished
New seat	Member for Merthyr; 1912 - 1915	Succeeded by Peter McLachlan
