= Charles Borromeo Fitzgerald =

Australian politician

Charles Fitzgerald
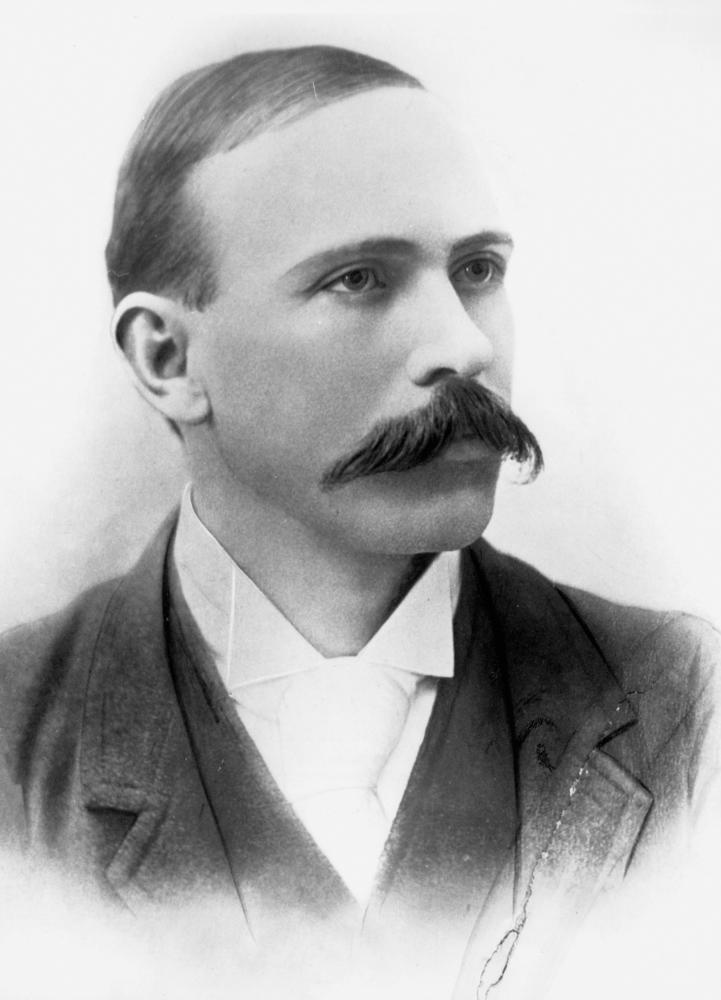
- Charles Borromeo Fitzgerald in 1899

Member of the Queensland Legislative Assembly for Mitchell
- In office 4 April 1896 – 11 March 1902
- Preceded by: John Cameron
- Succeeded by: Arthur Cooper

Personal details
- Born: Charles Borromeo Fitzgerald; 25 June 1865 Rockhampton, Queensland, Australia
- Died: 10 February 1913 (aged 47) Longreach, Queensland, Australia
- Party: Labor
- Spouse: Joan Mary Cahill
- Relations: Thomas Henry Fitzgerald (father), Paddy Fitzgerald (son)
- Occupation: Barrister, Solicitor

Charles Borromeo Fitzgerald (28 June 1865 – 10 February 1913) was a barrister and politician from Queensland, Australia.

Fitzgerald was born in 1865 in Rockhampton, Queensland, the fifth son of Jessie and Thomas Henry Fitzgerald. He received his education in France and was a noted scholar. He became a barrister and he married Joan Mary Cahill from Ireland. Fitzgerald was a captain with the Queensland Irish Volunteers.

The resignation of John Francis Buckland caused a by-election in 1892 for a member of the Legislative Assembly of Queensland representing the Electoral district of Bulimba. Fitzgerald contested the election for the Labor Party, but was defeated by James Dickson. In the same year, Fitzgerald moved to Longreach.

In the 1893 colonial election, Fitzgerald contested the seat of Mitchell as an independent Labor candidate against John A. Campbell, the official Labor candidate, and John Cameron. It was an intense campaign, with many Labor supporters travelling to Mitchell in support of Campbell, including Tommy Ryan, the sitting member of Barcoo. Cameron won the poll, but Fitzgerald had much more voter support than Campbell, with 261 versus 71 votes cast.

Fitzgerald received the Labor Party endorsement for the 1896 election, and on 4 April 1896, he defeated Cameron in Mitchell. In the 1899 election, Fitzgerald was again successful in Mitchell, defeating Messrs Edkins and Magoffin. Fitzgerald was Attorney-General of Queensland for six days in December 1899. In the 1902 state election, Fitzgerald was beaten by Arthur Cooper by 112 votes.

After his defeat, Fitzgerald moved to Barcaldine, then Brisbane, back to his birthplace Rockhampton, and then Mount Morgan. He returned to Rockhampton once again in 1911. He was taken to Longreach Hospital on 9 February 1913, described as "not ill but off colour", where he died the next morning from heart failure. He was survived by his wife and family; one of his sons was Paddy Fitzgerald.

Parliament of Queensland
Preceded by John Cameron	Member for Mitchell; 1896–1902	Succeeded by Arthur Cooper
