= Mat Reid =

Scottish-born Australian politician

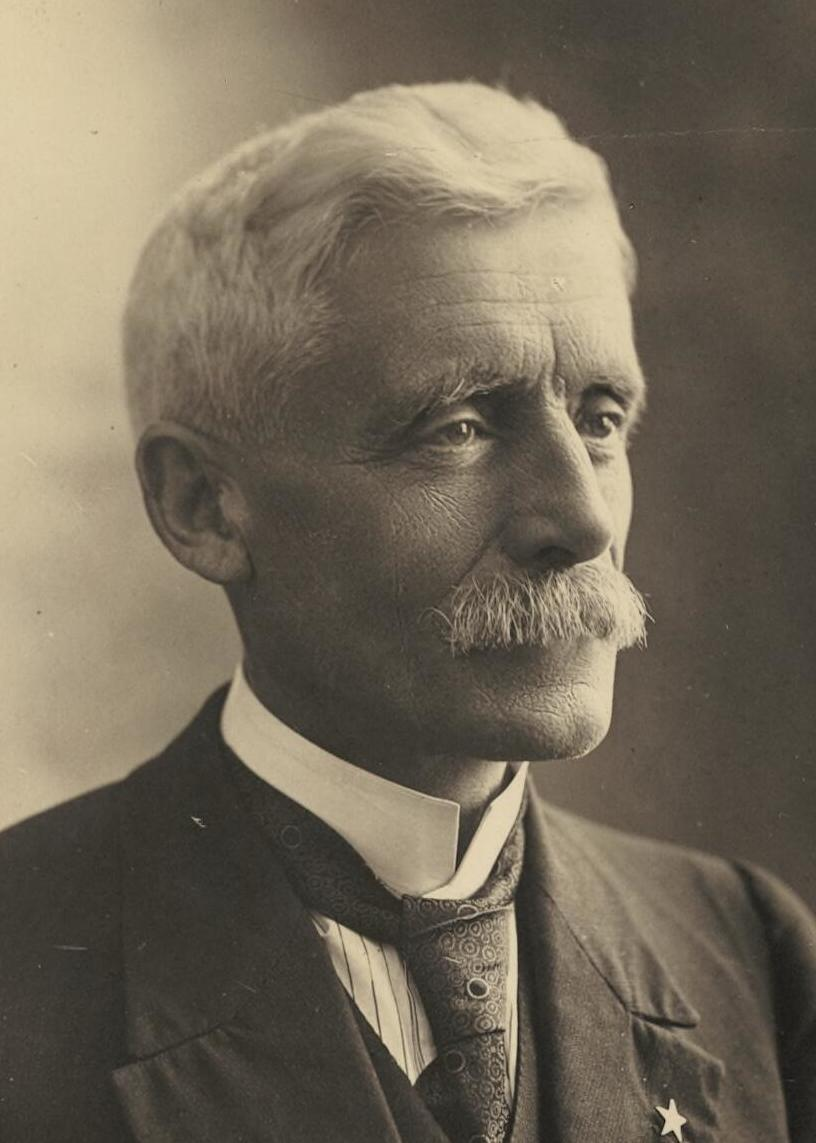

Senator for Queensland
- In office 1 July 1917 – 30 June 1935

Member of the Queensland Legislative Assembly
- In office 23 December 1899 – 11 May 1902
- Preceded by: James Drake
- Succeeded by: Arthur Hawthorn
- Constituency: Enoggera
- In office 29 April 1893 – 21 May 1896
- Preceded by: Theodore Unmack
- Succeeded by: Thomas Finney
- Constituency: Toowong

Personal details
- Born: 30 September 1856 Dalmellington, Ayrshire, Scotland
- Died: 28 August 1947 (aged 90) Toowong, Queensland, Australia
- Party: Labor (1893–1909); Liberal (1909–17); Nationalist (1917–31); UAP (1931–35)
- Spouse: Mary Smart (m. 1879)
- Occupation: Labour organiser

Matthew Reid (30 September 1856 – 28 August 1947) was an Australian politician and trade unionist. He was a senator for Queensland from 1917 to 1935, representing the Nationalist and the United Australia Party. He began his career in the Australian Labor Party and served in the Queensland Legislative Assembly from 1893 to 1896 and 1899 to 1902.

== Early life ==
Reid was born on 30 September 1856 in Dalmellington, Scotland. He was raised by his unmarried mother Elizabeth Reid and the identity of his father is not known.

Few details of Reid's education and early life are known. He served an apprenticeship as a carpenter in Glasgow and later worked as a carpenter in London where he was a member of the Amalgamated Society of Carpenters and Joiners. He was also active in the Social Democratic Federation. Reid immigrated to Australia in 1887, intending to take up a selection. He instead continued in his trade in Brisbane and became involved with the local labour movement.

== Queensland politics ==
Reid was elected to the Queensland Legislative Assembly at the 1893 general election, winning the seat of Toowong. He was defeated after a single term at the 1896 election. In parliament, Reid advocated a parliamentary conciliation during the 1894 shearer's strike and "campaigned for the unemployed, conciliation boards, public access to agricultural land, and educational opportunity".

Reid was an influential figure in the organisational wing of the Labor Party. He was elected president of the central political executive in 1905 and in the same year's Labor-in-Politics Convention engineered the adoption of the socialist objective as a key plank of the party's platform. Reid led opposition within the party to the parliamentary leader William Kidston's attempts to secure a coalition with non-Labor MPs. The Kidstonites left the party in 1907, with Reid denouncing Kidston as a reactionary and in turn being labelled "the high priest of the extremist camp". According to the Australian Dictionary of Biography, Reid was known for his "powerful, perhaps ruthless, extra-parliamentary rule on Labor's political executive". The party split decreased his power and he resigned from the executive in 1909 in protest at its decision to endorse Joe Lesina as a parliamentary candidate.

== Federal politics ==
Reid was elected to a six-year Senate term at the 1917 federal election, running on the ticket of the Nationalist Party. He was endorsed by Prime Minister Billy Hughes, who had formed the Nationalist Party after being expelled from Labor in 1916 as a result of the party's split over conscription. He was re-elected to further Senate terms at the 1922 and 1928 elections. He joined the new United Australia Party in 1931 and retired at the expiry of his final term on 30 June 1935.

In 1921, Reid was appointed by the Hughes government as chairman of a royal commission into the Cockatoo Island Dockyard. He was a member of the Joint Statutory Committee on Public Works from 1923 to 1931 and also served on two select committees.

== Personal life ==
In 1879, Reid married Mary Smart. He died on 28 August 1947 at his home in Toowong, Queensland, aged 90. He was survived by two daughters and one son.

Reid was a prominent Theosophist. He joined the Theosophical Society in 1908 and remained a member for the rest of his life, leaving a bequest to the society's Brisbane branch. He gave public lectures on Theosophy and was influenced by Annie Besant, teaching a class on her Study in Consciousness and helping facilitate her entry into Australia in 1922.

Parliament of Queensland
Preceded by Theodore Unmack	Member for Toowong; 1893 – 1896	Succeeded by Thomas Finney
Preceded by James Drake	Member for Enoggera; 1899 – 1902	Succeeded by Arthur Hawthorn
