= Theodore Unmack =

Australian politician

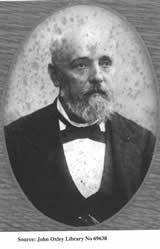

Member of the Queensland Legislative Assembly for Toowong
- In office 19 May 1888 – 29 April 1893
- Preceded by: New seat
- Succeeded by: Matthew Reid

Personal details
- Born: Theodore Oscar Unmack; 21 December 1835 Hamburg, Germany
- Died: 17 September 1919 (aged 83) Brisbane, Queensland, Australia
- Resting place: Toowong Cemetery
- Spouse(s): Kathleen Macdonnell, Robina Glassford
- Occupation: Businessman

Theodore Oscar Unmack (21 December 1835 – 17 September 1919) was a politician in Queensland, Australia. He was a Member of the Queensland Legislative Assembly and Postmaster-General of Queensland.

== Early life ==
Unmack was born at Hamburg and arrived in Victoria (Australia) in 1853, where he engaged in mercantile pursuits. He went to Queensland in 1860, and commenced business in Brisbane.

== Public life ==
On 19 May 1888, Unmack was elected to the Queensland Legislative Assembly in the electoral district of Toowong in the 1888 colonial election. He held the seat until 29 April 1893 (the 1893 election).

Unmack was also president of the Brisbane Chamber of Commerce for several years, and for two years acted as Consul for Germany. He was a prominent Freemason, and held the position of Provincial Grand Master (I.C.).

On the accession to power of Sir Samuel Griffith, Unmack was appointed Secretary for Railways and Postmaster-General on 12 August 1890; he held those roles until 27 March 1893.

== Later life ==
Unmack died on 17 September 1919 and was buried in Toowong Cemetery. He was survived by his second wife, four sons and two daughters.

Parliament of Queensland
| New seat | Member for Toowong; 1888–1893 | Succeeded by Matthew Reid |
