= John Cameron (Queensland politician, born 1845) =

Australian politician

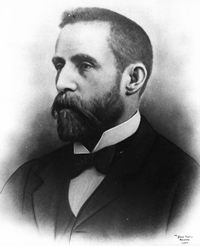

Member of the Queensland Legislative Assembly for Mitchell
- In office 20 May 1893 – 4 April 1896
- Preceded by: James Crombie
- Succeeded by: Charles Fitzgerald

Member of the Queensland Legislative Assembly for Brisbane North
- In office 10 August 1901 – 5 February 1908 Serving with Edward Forrest
- Preceded by: Thomas MacDonald-Paterson
- Succeeded by: Edward Barton

Personal details
- Born: John Cameron; 12 March 1845 New Amsterdam, British Guiana
- Died: 25 June 1914 (aged 69) Brisbane, Queensland, Australia
- Resting place: Toowong Cemetery
- Party: Ministerialist
- Other political affiliations: Opposition
- Spouse(s): Sarah Annie Lodge (m.1877 d.1893), Lousie Christine Heussler (m.1899 d.1917)
- Relations: Sir Donald Cameron (son), John Heussler (father-in-law)
- Occupation: Pastoralist, businessman

John Cameron (12 March 1845 – 25 June 1914) was a member of the Queensland Legislative Assembly.

== Early years ==
Cameron was born in New Amsterdam, British Guiana, to parents Donald Charles Cameron, plantation manager, and his wife Margaret Anne (née Moore). His grandfather had been an officer of the 79th Highlanders at the Battle of Waterloo. His father left for Australia in 1852 and after settling in Victoria his family followed on the SS Great Britain the following year. On their arrival, the family took up Native Creek and later Berremboke stations near Geelong.

Whilst in Victoria, Cameron attended Scotch College in Melbourne and Geelong Grammar School where, he later claimed "I never did any good beyond being a good fighter". After leaving school in 1859, he began work as a jackaroo and two years later the Camerons joined up with the Crombie family to drive their flocks to Barcaldine in Queensland. Around 1865, John Cameron went out on his own and found work as an overseer at Alice Downs before becoming manager of Wilby Downs.

The Camerons and Crombies joined with others to form a business partnership that embraced seven properties which John later became a partner in. In 1877, the business was wound up but Cameron, along with his brother-in-law, James Crombie, kept control of Kensington Downs and Greenhills. After that partnership folded in 1881, Cameron joined with his mother in the running of Kensington Downs.

== Political career ==
Cameron, representing the Opposition, stood for the seat of Mitchell at the 1893 colonial election, and defeated Charles Fitzgerald, the Labour candidate, and J. Campbell, an independent. He served one term before losing his seat to Fitzgerald in 1896. At the 1899 election, Cameron, now representing the Ministerialists, stood for the seat of Barcoo but was defeated by Labour's George Kerr.

In 1901, the state member for Brisbane North, Thomas MacDonald-Paterson, resigned the seat to enter Federal Parliament and Cameron was his replacement. He held the seat until 1908 when ill-health forced his resignation.

== Personal life ==
Cameron married Sarah Annie Lodge in Mudgee and together had four sons and one daughter. One of the sons, Sir Donald Cameron, went on to have a distinguished career in the Federal Parliament. Sarah died in 1893 and in 1899 he married Louise Christine Heussler, the daughter of John Heussler. This marriage realised one son.

Cameron died in Brisbane in June 1914 and after a private funeral was buried at Toowong Cemetery.

Parliament of Queensland
| Preceded by James Crombie | Member for Mitchell; 1893–1896 | Succeeded by Charles Fitzgerald |
| Preceded by Thomas MacDonald-Paterson | Member for Brisbane North; 1901–1908; Served alongside: Edward Forrest | Succeeded by Edward Barton |
