= Donald Charles Cameron (politician) =

Australian politician (1879–1960)

Sir Donald Cameron KCMG, DSO, VD
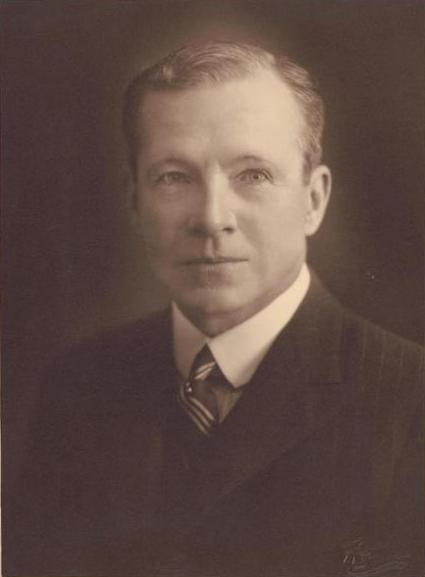

Member of the Australian Parliament for Brisbane
- In office 13 December 1919 – 19 December 1931
- Preceded by: William Finlayson
- Succeeded by: George Lawson

Member of the Australian Parliament for Lilley
- In office 15 September 1934 – 21 September 1937
- Preceded by: George Mackay
- Succeeded by: William Jolly

Personal details
- Born: 19 November 1879 Brisbane, Queensland
- Died: 19 November 1960 (aged 81) Brisbane, Queensland
- Party: Nationalist (1919–31); United Australia Party (1931–37)
- Relations: John Cameron (father)
- Occupation: Military officer

Military service
- Allegiance: Australia
- Branch/service: Australian Army
- Years of service: 1901–1919
- Rank: Lieutenant Colonel
- Commands: 5th Light Horse Regiment
- Battles/wars: Boxer Rebellion; Second Boer War; First World War; Gallipoli Campaign; Sinai and Palestine Campaign; Battle of Romani; Battle of Beersheba
- Awards: Knight Commander of the Order of St Michael and St George; Distinguished Service Order; Colonial Auxiliary Forces Officers' Decoration; Mentioned in Despatches (4); Order of the Nile (Egypt)

Sir Donald Charles Cameron, KCMG, DSO, VD (19 November 1879 – 19 November 1960) was an Australian politician and soldier. He was a member of the Australian House of Representatives as the Nationalist Party of Australia member for Brisbane from 1919 to 1931 and as the United Australia Party member for Lilley from 1934 to 1937.

== Early life ==
Cameron was born in Brisbane on 19 November 1879. He was one of five children born to Sarah Annie (née Lodge) and John Cameron. His mother died in 1893 and his father had one further child from his second marriage.

Cameron's father was a pastoralist of Scottish descent who had been born in British Guiana and arrived in Victoria as a child. He later amassed substantial pastoral holdings in Queensland. Cameron spent his early childhood at Kensington Downs, a family-owned grazing property near Longreach. He attended Toowoomba Grammar School and Brisbane Grammar School and subsequently obtained work as a clerk at the Queensland Meat Export and Agency Company, where his father was chairman of the board.

== Military service ==
Cameron volunteered for the Queensland Imperial Bushmen in the Second Boer War and with American forces in China during the Boxer Rebellion. He managed the family property, Kensington Downs, along with his brothers between 1902 and 1914, when he joined the Australian Imperial Force for service in the First World War. He was shot through the liver and lung at Gallipoli, and finished the war as a lieutenant colonel in command of the 5th Light Horse Regiment. He was mentioned in despatches, received the Order of the Nile, and was appointed a Companion of the Order of St Michael and St George for his war service.

== Politics ==
In 1919 Cameron won the seat of Brisbane for the Nationalist Party of Australia, holding it until he was defeated by the Australian Labor Party in 1931. In 1934 he won the nearby seat of Lilley. In 1932 he was made a Knight Commander of the Order of St Michael and St George.

Cameron resigned from the House of Representatives on 21 September 1937 to contest the Senate at the 1937 federal election. He was unsuccessful and subsequently retired from politics.

== Later life ==
During the Second World War, Cameron was chairman of the New South Wales recruiting committee for the Royal Australian Air Force. He died on 19 November 1960 and was cremated; his ashes were buried in the family cemetery on Home Creek Station.

Parliament of Australia
Preceded by William Finlayson	Member for Brisbane; 1919–1931	Succeeded by George Lawson
Preceded by George Mackay	Member for Lilley; 1934–1937	Succeeded by William Jolly
