= John Payne (Queensland politician) =

Australian politician

Member of the Queensland Legislative Assembly for Mitchell
- In office 13 May 1905 – 14 January 1928
- Preceded by: Arthur Cooper
- Succeeded by: Richard Bow

Personal details
- Born: John Payne; 9 November 1860 Goulburn, New South Wales, Australia
- Died: 14 January 1928 (aged 67) Brisbane, Queensland, Australia
- Resting place: Longreach Cemetery
- Party: Labor
- Spouse: Elizabeth Catherine Ahern (m.1892 d.1924)
- Occupation: Shearer, Blacksmith

John Payne (9 November 1860 – 14 January 1928) was a member of the Queensland Legislative Assembly.

== Biography ==
Payne was born in Goulburn, New South Wales, the son of William Payne and his wife Mary (née Brogham). He was educated at state and private Schools in New South Wales. He came to Queensland in 1882 where he worked as a shearer, and general bush worker and in 1885 opened a blacksmith and wheelwright business at Arrilalah, which lasted about a year. He went back to shearing until 1890 and the next year held an important position on the Second Strike Committee and later that year opened another blacksmith and wheelwright business in Longreach which he operated for four years.

On 2 July 1892 Payne married Elizabeth Catherine Ahern (died 1924) and together had three sons and six daughters. He died at the Ingarfield Private Hospital in Brisbane in January 1928 and after a service at Corpus Christi Catholic Church at Nundah his body was shipped by train to Longreach for his burial.

== Public life ==
Having previously been an organiser for the Amalgamated Workers' Union, Payne, a member of the Labour Party, won the 1905 by-election for the seat of Mitchell, to replace the previous member, Arthur Cooper who had returned to England. He went on to represent the seat until his death in 1928.

Parliament of Queensland
Preceded by Arthur Cooper	Member for Mitchell; 1905–1928	Succeeded by Richard Bow
