= Edward Gustavus Campbell Barton =

Australian politician and electrical engineer

Edward Barton
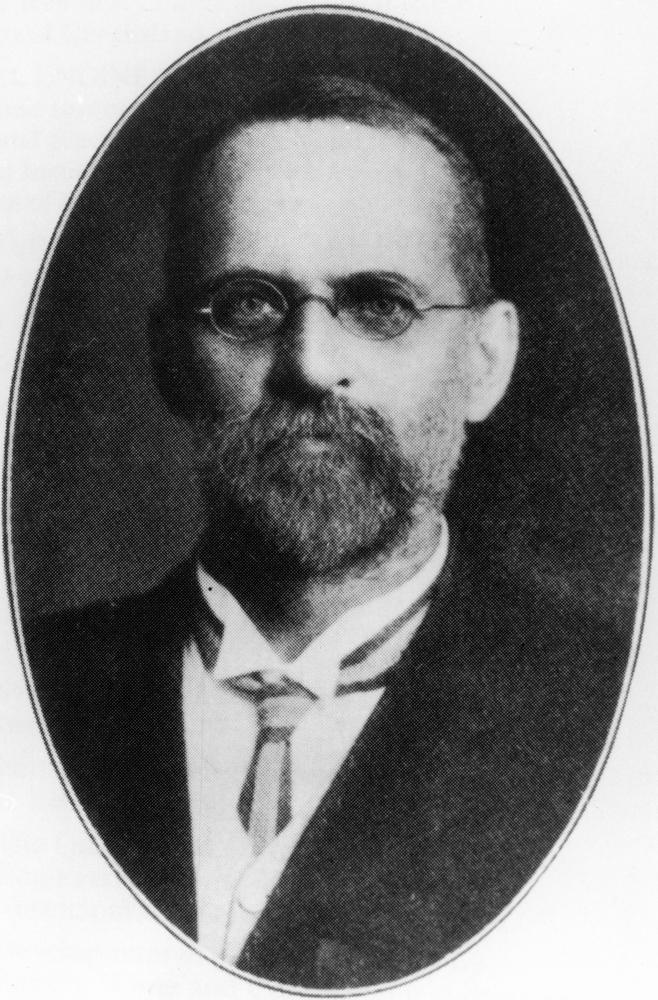

Member of the Queensland Legislative Assembly for Brisbane North
- In office 5 February 1908 – 2 October 1909 Serving with Edward Forrest
- Preceded by: John Cameron
- Succeeded by: Edward Macartney

Personal details
- Born: Edward Gustavus Campbell Barton; 11 December 1857 Toorak, Colony of Victoria
- Died: 14 June 1942 (aged 84) Watford, Hertfordshire, England
- Party: Kidstonites
- Spouse: Mary Allen Sutton (m.1893)
- Education: Karlsruhe University, Otago University
- Occupation: Electrical engineer

Edward Gustavus Campbell Barton (11 December 1857 – 14 June 1942) was an electrical engineer and a member of the Queensland Legislative Assembly.

== Early years ==
Barton was born in Toorak, Colony of Victoria, to parents George Elliott Barton, a barrister from Ireland, and his Scottish wife, Jane Crichton (née Campbell). After receiving his schooling in Dunedin, New Zealand, he studied electrical engineering at Otago University and then Karlsruhe University in Germany. After gaining further experience at his profession in Scotland, Barton became superintendent of England's first commercial electric-lighting system in Godalming, Surrey.

He then became a consultant in both New Zealand and Australia where he installed electrical plant for the Phoenix Gold Mines at Gympie in Queensland and also worked for the Australasian Electric Light, Power & Storage Co. In 1886, he was employed to complete lighting installations at Parliament House and the Government Printing Office in Brisbane before resigning in 1888 to go into business with C. F. White. This partnership began supplying electricity to the public from their Edison Lane premises by means of a direct-current generator driven by a steam-engine.

Although their first customer was the General Post Office, the pair found competition from gas companies and general conservatism to this new idea a major hurdle and in 1896 the company was liquidated. Barton then formed the Brisbane Electric Supply Co. Ltd and within a few years had moved from Edison Lane to new premises in Ann Street where in 1901 he installed the first steam turbine in the state. The company was renamed the City Electric Light Co. Ltd in 1904 and Barton later resigned to once again act as a consultant.

== Wireless telegraphy experiments ==
Barton had a close association with the Brisbane Central Technical College and in a private capacity ran courses with lectures which paralleled the rapid advances in all matters electrical at the time. In July 1891 he gave a lecture at the Brisbane School of Arts on the topic of induction coils, a key component of wireless and X-ray technology. In April 1899 he gave a comprehensively reported lecture on Wireless Telegraphy at the Technical College and concluded with a demonstration of "Marconi apparatus" including both an induction coil and a Branly detector. In mid-1901, Barton gave an entire series of lectures at the Technical College on the subject of Telegraphy and in May 1901 the lecture was devoted to wireless telegraphy, again concluding with a demonstration of his equipment. It was stated that the system had been imported and consisted of a Righi oscillator, induction coil and Branly coherer. A further series of lectures was conducted in 1902, including one in March 1902 on the subject "Wireless Telegraphy and its Position in Regard to Submarine Cables". The descriptions of the demonstration tend to indicate that the wireless apparatus had not been further developed. Indeed, though Barton's own career continue to ascend, there is little further reference to wireless activities. However, amongst his young students was John Graeme Balsillie who went on to become the inventor of the Balsillie system of wireless telegraphy which was used to deploy the majority of Australia's coastal radio network in the early 1910s.

== Political career ==
At the 1908 state election, Barton, representing the Kidstonites, was a candidate for the two member seat of Brisbane North. Along with Edward Forrest, Barton was returned in a close contest, winning his seat by 31 votes. He was in parliament for just over 18 months and did not stand at the 1909 state election.

== Later life ==
Having lectured in electrical engineering and physics at the Brisbane Central Technical College since 1889, Barton became president of the College's council in 1905. He had also urged the establishment of a local university in 1901 and when the University of Queensland opened in 1909, Barton was appointed to its first senate, chairing the buildings and grounds committee. In 1910, he was president of the Brisbane Institute of Social Service, serving in that role until 1915.

In 1915, Barton travelled to England to work for the British Ministry of Munitions. Fluent in French, German and Italian, he later served the Admiralty in an information department. After World War I Barton elected to stay in Europe but returned home several times in the 1920s. Around 1918 he joined the British Decimal Association and served as its chairman from 1938 until 1942.

A fellow of the Royal Meteorological Society and the Royal Geographical Society, Barton died at Watford, Hertfordshire in June 1942 and was later cremated.

Parliament of Queensland
Preceded by John Cameron	Member for Brisbane North; 1908–1909; Served alongside: Edward Forrest	Succeeded by Edward Macartney
