= Welsby =

Welsby is a surname. It may refer to:

- Arthur Welsby (1902–1980), footballer
- Chris Welsby (born 1948), filmmaker
- Elton Welsby (born 1951), English television sports presenter
- John Welsby (1938–2021), Chief Executive of the British Railways Board
- Thomas Welsby (1858–1941), Queensland businessman, author, politician, and sportsman.
- William Newland Welsby (d. 1864), legal writer

It might also refer to Welsby, Queensland, a locality on Bribie Island named after Thomas Welsby.
