= Paddy Fitzgerald =

Australian brewer (1896–1984)

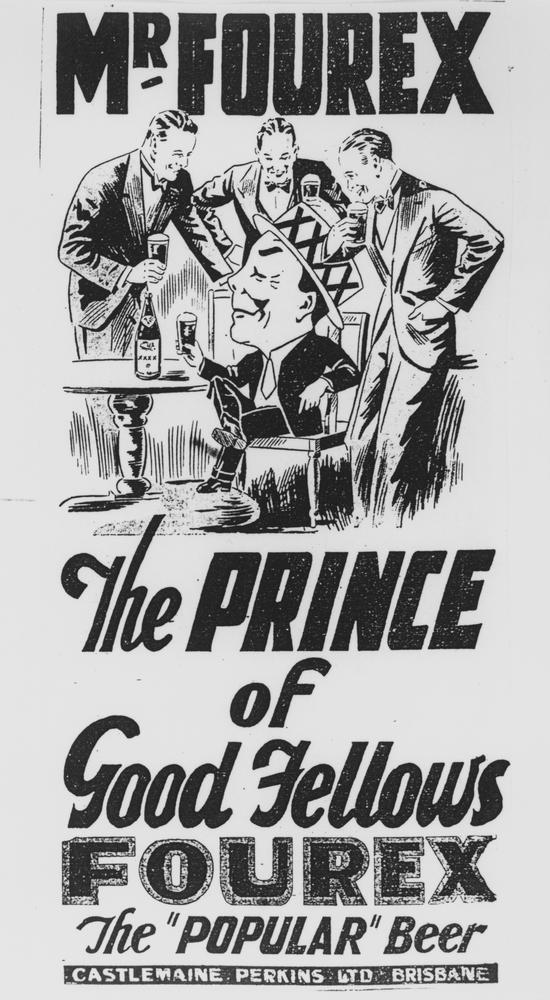
Mr Fourex in a 1920s advertisement

Patrick Charles Mitchell Fitzgerald (21 June 1896 – 10 September 1984) was a brewer from Rockhampton, Queensland, Australia.

He was the son eldest son of Charles Borromeo Fitzgerald, a solicitor, member of the Legislative Assembly of Queensland, and Attorney-General of Queensland (for just six days). His mother was Joan Mary Fitzgerald (née Cahill). His paternal grandfather was the Queensland pioneer Thomas Henry FitzGerald.

Fitzgerald started at XXXX brewery in circa 1933, where his aunt's husband was managing director. He made a career within the brewery and became managing director himself in 1977, a role from which he retired in February 1979. Later that year, XXXX merged with Castlemaine Tooheys Ltd, and Fitzgerald retired as a director in 1981. He had a likeness with Mr Fourex, the brewery's advertising mascot, and many believed that it was modelled on him, but the mascot had been developed in the 1920s. He died at his home in Bardon on 10 September 1984 and was buried in Nudgee Cemetery.
