= Queensland Brewery Company Building =

Heritage-listed building in Brisbane, Queensland

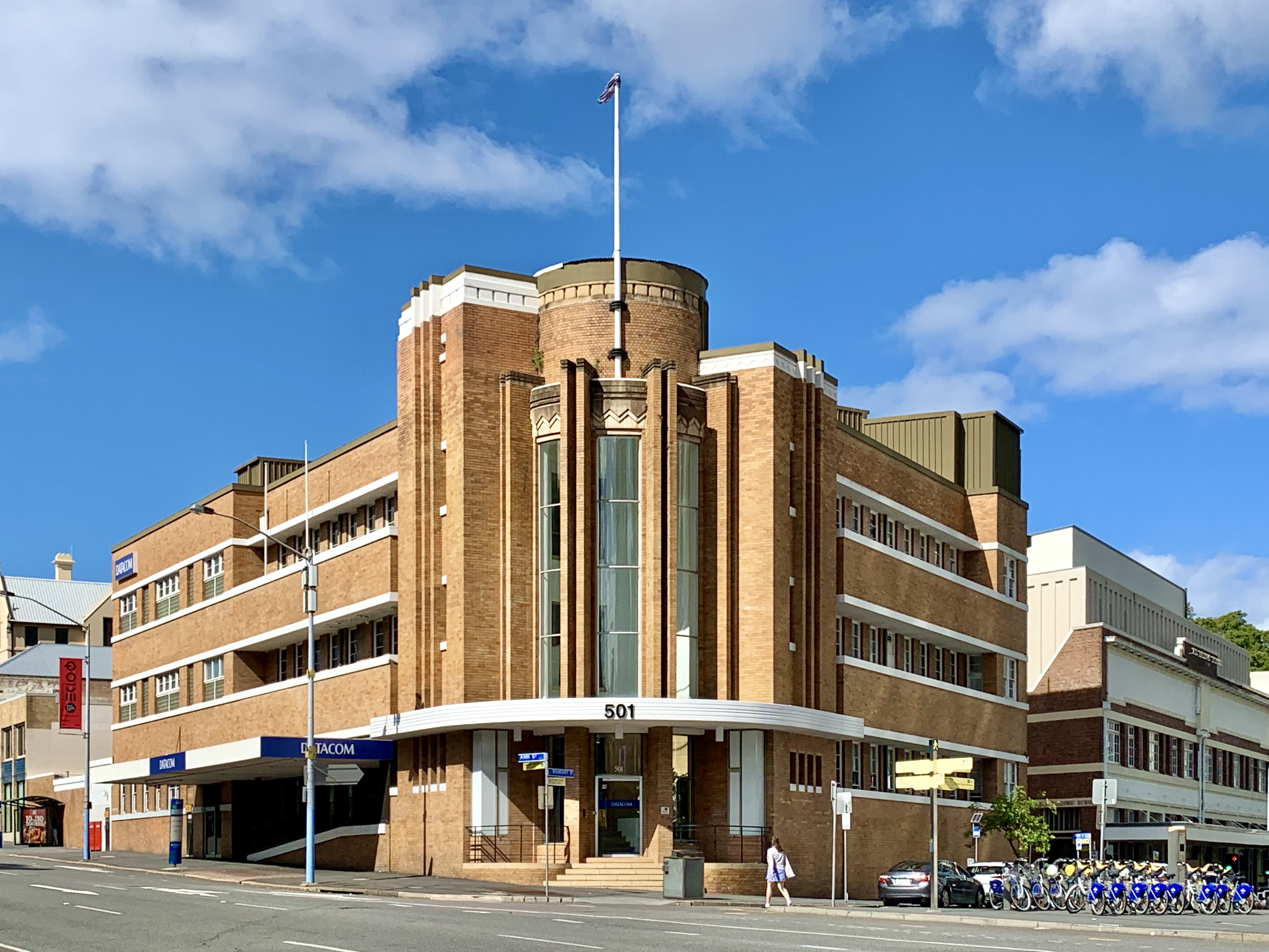
- Former Queensland Brewery Company Building, 2009

- Location within Queensland Location within Australia
- 27.4616°S 153.0322°E
- Location: 501 Ann Street, Fortitude Valley, City of Brisbane, Queensland, Australia

History
- Design period: 1939–1945 (World War II)
- Built: 1940–1942

Site notes
- Architect: H. S. Macdonald
- Architectural style: Functionalism

Queensland Heritage Register
- Official name: Credit Union Australia Building, Queensland Brewery Co, RACQ Building
- Type: state heritage (built)
- Designated: 21 October 1992
- Reference no.: 600080
- Significant period: 1940–1942 (fabric); 1942–1966, 1966–1980 (historical)
- Significant components: elevator, furniture/fittings

Queensland Brewery Company is a heritage-listed office building and warehouse at 501 Ann Street, Fortitude Valley, City of Brisbane, Queensland, Australia. It was designed by H. S. Macdonald for the Queensland Brewery Company and built from 1940 to 1942. It is also known as Credit Union Australia Building and RACQ Building. It was added to the Queensland Heritage Register on 21 October 1992.

== History ==
This building was constructed between 1940 and 1942 for the Queensland Brewery Company. Designed by Herbert Stanley Macdonald of Addison and Macdonald, it replaced the company's headquarters in Queen Street, Petrie Bight. Half the ground floor and the first floors were used as administrative offices, while the remainder of these floors and the top storey provided cellars, a wine and spirits department, cooperage and goods handling and loading facilities.

The design was a departure from accepted forms for commercial buildings in Queensland at the time. Macdonald fused the assertive curves and angles of the Art Deco with the flowing horizontal lines of the Functionalist movement. This latter style was characterised by its simple geometric shapes, its light colours and large glass areas. The building also exemplified the use of new materials like the original glass brick of the circular entry tower and the synthetic stone of the original signage. Both these elements have since been removed.

In February 1966 the property was purchased by the Royal Automobile Club of Queensland (RACQ). Architects Cook and Kerrison & Partners adapted the building for its new use. The offices on the ground floor were occupied by customer services, the first floor accommodated the RACQ insurance staff, and the second floor provided management offices and two board rooms.

In 1980 the property was sold to the Australia Post and Telecom Credit Union, although RACQ leased the building for three years until their new offices were constructed. Credit Union Australia purchased the property in 1983, and undertook further modifications.

== Description ==
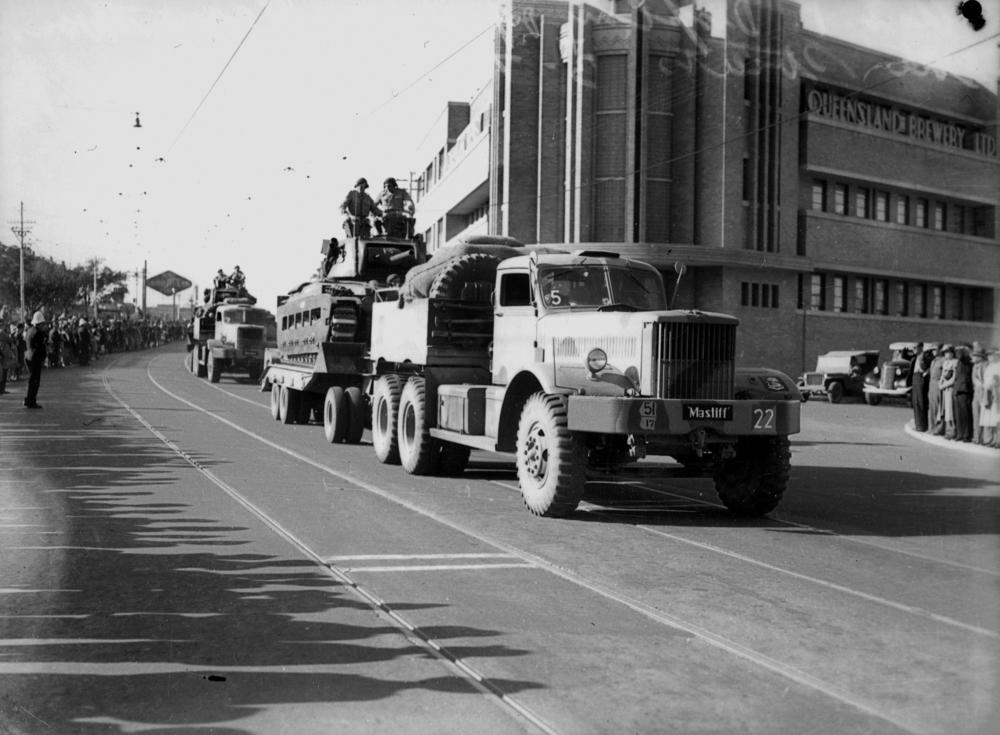
Parade of military passing the Queensland Brewery Company Building, July 1942

The three storeyed brick building is prominently located on the corner of Ann and Boundary Streets, opposite Centenary Place. It is built with applied Art Deco motifs influenced by the Functionalist movement.

Horizontal strip windows delineate levels on the two street facades and contrast with the vertically expressed elements of the corner tower. This tower forms a prominent entry and also serves as the location for vertical circulation. A chevron motif is regularly spaced around its upper portion.

The Ann Street facade has a cantilevered awning over a ramp providing access to a second entry.

The main entry vestibule is a three storeyed void with a corner entry at the ground floor level and a second inner entry parallel to Ann Street. This makes the lower portion of this space asymmetrical. The original glass blocks of the corner piece have been replaced by curved plate glass. The lower portion of the three storeyed space is of concrete block while plaster is located above marked to simulate blockwork. The ceiling is plaster and has a decorated cornice and a vertical light fitting suspended from its centre. The stairwell is walled with plaster marked in a similar way to the upper portion of the entry vestibule. The stair has polished timber handrails with a metal balustrade and brackets. The passenger elevator is predominantly intact. Only some of the original timber veneer partitioning remains in the general office space.

Despite the loss of some of its integrity the building is still an indicator of the beginning of the stylistic influence of the European Modern Movement in Queensland. It is also prominent for the manner in which it is designed to take advantage of its location on a corner site.

== Heritage listing ==
The Queensland Brewery Company Building was listed on the Queensland Heritage Register on 21 October 1992 having satisfied the following criteria.

The place is important in demonstrating the evolution or pattern of Queensland's history.

The building is significant as a relatively rare example of a landmark building with Art Deco embellishments. The building is significant as an example of the work of H S McDonald who played a role in the introduction of Functionalist style to Queensland.

The place is important in demonstrating the principal characteristics of a particular class of cultural places.

The building is significant as a relatively rare example of a landmark building with Art Deco embellishments. The building is significant as an example of the work of H S McDonald who played a role in the introduction of Functionalist style to Queensland.

The place is important because of its aesthetic significance.

The building is significant as a relatively rare example of a landmark building with Art Deco embellishments.
