= John Dunmore Campbell =

Australian politician

John Campbell
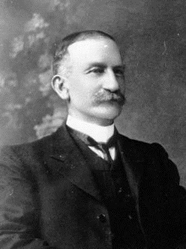

Member of the Queensland Legislative Assembly for Moreton
- In office 18 March 1899 – 29 May 1909
- Preceded by: Matthew Battersby
- Succeeded by: James Forsyth

Personal details
- Born: John Dunmore Campbell; 19 April 1854 Brisbane, Queensland, Australia
- Died: 19 June 1909 (aged 55) Albion, Queensland, Australia
- Resting place: Toowong Cemetery
- Party: Ministerial
- Spouse: Mary Cameron (m.1876 d.1941)
- Relations: William Aplin, James Forsyth, Robert Philp (brothers-in-law)
- Occupation: Businessman

John Dunmore Campbell (19 April 1854 – 19 June 1909) was a member of the Queensland Legislative Assembly.

== Biography ==
Campbell was born in Brisbane, Queensland, the son of James Campbell, a timber merchant, and his wife Mary Isabella (née Mitchell) and was baptized by the Rev. John Dunmore Lang. Educated at Brisbane Normal School, he left at an early age to learn the building trade. When he was eighteen he entered his father's business to widen his commercial knowledge and he became a partner in the company, now known as James Campbell & Sons when it became a limited company 1896.

On 11 May 1876 Campbell married Mary Cameron and together had five sons and four daughters. Three of his sisters were married to William Aplin, James Forsyth, and Robert Philp. He died at his Albion residence, Donatello, in June 1909 after being ill for several months. His funeral moved from Donatello to the Toowong Cemetery.

== Public life ==
Campbell was a member for nine years on the Caboolture Divisional Board. At the 1899 Queensland colonial election he won the seat of Moreton for the Ministerialists. He held the seat for ten years before resigning in May 1909 due to ill health. Campbell died a month later, the day his replacement and brother-in-law, James Forsyth, was elected at the by-election to replace him in parliament.

He was appointed Secretary for Railways in 1907–1908 during Robert Philp's second run as Premier of Queensland. Campbell was president of Brisbane Chamber of Commerce in 1889–1890, councilor of the Industrial Association of Queensland in 1890–1893, and vice-president of Queensland Employer's Association in 1893–1896. He was also vice-president of the Queensland Rugby Union during 1894–1905.

Parliament of Queensland
Preceded by Matthew Battersby	Member for Moreton; 1899–1909	Succeeded by James Forsyth
