= Queensland Brewery Ltd =

Brewing company of Australia

Coordinates: 27.46088°S 153.03677°E

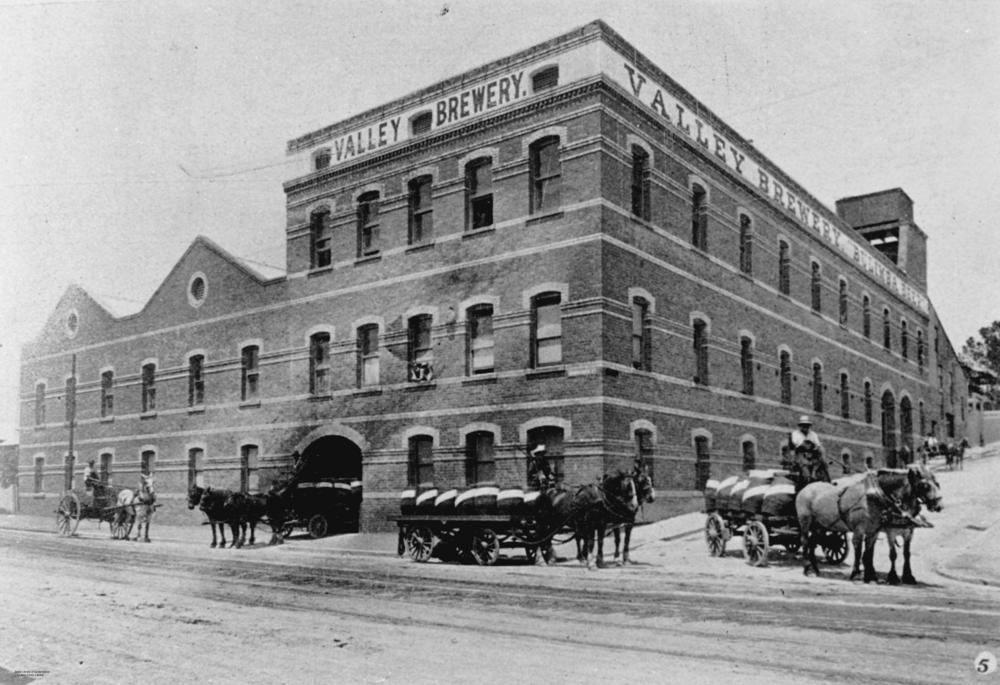
Queensland Brewery in Fortitude Valley, Brisbane, Queensland, 1908

Queensland Brewery Ltd was a company that operated a brewery in Brisbane, Queensland, Australia.

== History ==
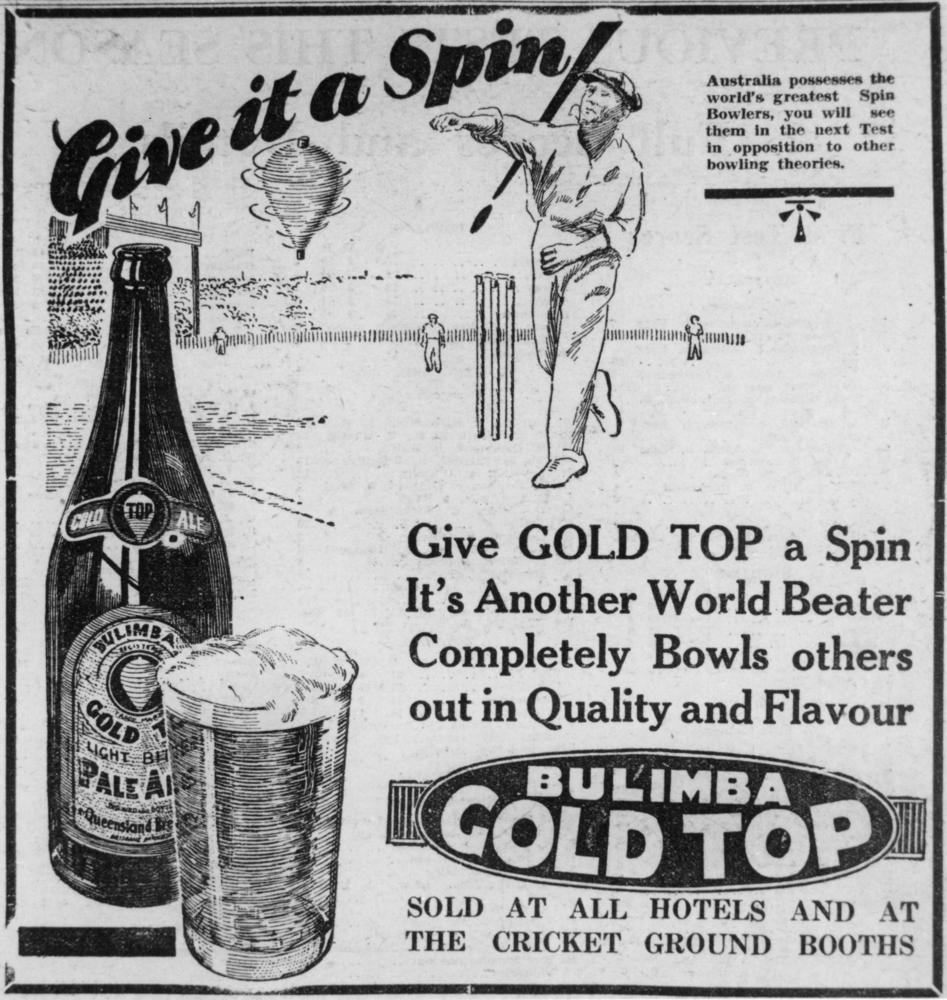
Advertisement for Bulimba Gold Top beer, 1933

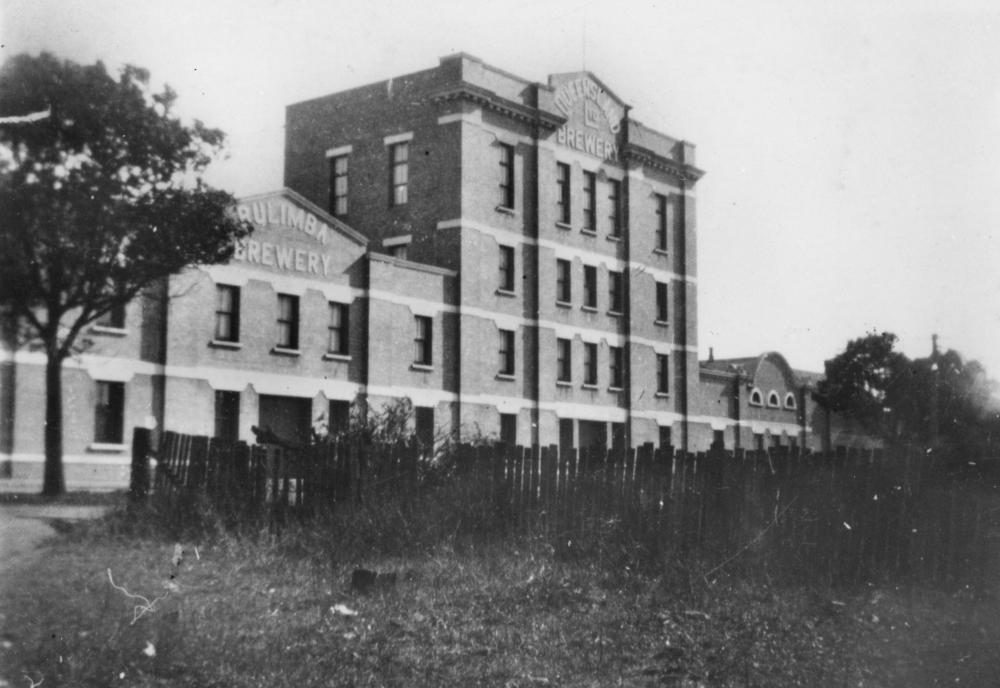
Queensland Brewery premises on Brunswick Street, Fortitude Valley, Brisbane, circa 1920

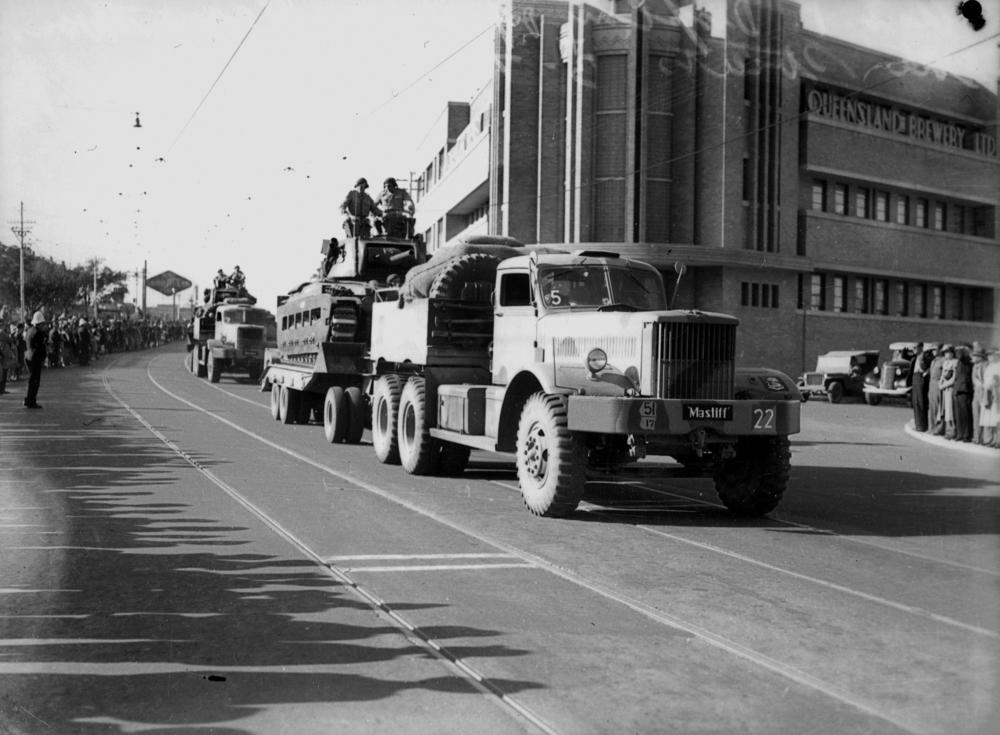
Parade of military vehicles with the new headquarters in the background, July 1942

Originally, the brewery was based at Bulimba in Brisbane, Queensland,(now known as Teneriffe) in on the western bank of the Bulimba Reach of the Brisbane River and was known as the Eagle Brewery. In May 1883, Messrs Tooth and Company sold the Eagle Brewery and Sugar Refinery to Mr Huesman and partners for £15,500.

In August 1884 at the Brisbane Exhibition, the Queensland Brewing Company Limited won prizes for its draught malt ale, draught XXX ale, draught porter, bottled malt ale and bottled porter.

The Queensland Brewery Ltd company appeared to be established in 1888 (its 25th annual report being released in 1913). At some point, it was renamed Queensland Brewery. In 1901, it was producing draught beer as well as two bottled beers known as "Silver top" and "Gold top".

In 1906, it relocated to Brunswick Street, Fortitude Valley (a landmark observed by motorists as they entered the Story Bridge from the northside), although the bridge did not open until 1940.

In the early 1940s, the company built a new headquarters and wine and spirit store at 501 Ann Street in Fortitude Valley. Designed in the Functionalist style with Art Deco motifs, the Queensland Brewery Company Building is now listed on the Queensland Heritage Register.

In 1961, the company was taken over by Carlton & United Breweries. In 1993, the brewery was relocated to Yatala.

== Bulimba Brewery Challenge Cup ==
In 1904 the Ipswich and West Moreton Rugby Union senior clubs played for the Bulimba Brewery Challenge Cup. "This magnificent silver trophy of rather unique design, with staghorn handles, was on view in Mr. Sam Green's window, Brisbane street, Ipswich."

The Cup was won by St Paul's Football Club of the St Paul's Young Men's Society. "Mr. Roots, as captain of the football club, presented to the president, to hold for the society, the handsome Bulimba Cup, won last season. It was adorned with the club's colours and had been tastefully engraved at Mr. W. T. Pratt's establishment with the words "Presented to St. Paul's Young Men's Society by St. Paul's Football Club," with the date. Mr. Harris suitably replied on behalf of the society, and complimented the footballers on their prowess."

The Bulimba Cup, again provided by the Queensland Brewery, was first competed for in 1925 by the Rugby League.

== Notable people ==
- Thomas Welsby was chairman of the board of directors in 1907

== See also ==
- Australian pub
- Beer in Australia
- List of breweries in Australia
