= John Graeme Balsillie =

John Graeme Balsillie (11 September 1885 – 10 July 1924) was an Australian inventor, communications engineer, wireless telegraphy pioneer, business proprietor and senior public servant. He is perhaps best known for overseeing the establishment of Australia's first coastal radio network, which used a wireless telegraphy system patented by himself and was generally known as the Australian system. Born in Brisbane, Queensland, he migrated with his family to London in 1903. His studies focussed from an early age on wireless telegraphy, and he soon found employment in that rapidly developing industry. After a decade of wireless experience, he was recruited by then Prime Minister Fisher as the "Commonwealth Wireless Telegraphy Expert". Balsillie helped to develop the Australian Wireless System free of royalty, jump-starting the nation's radio communications network. The coastal radio network was completed in time to play a significant part in Australia's defence of its borders in World War I.

== Early life and family ==
John Graeme Balsillie (generally known as Graeme) was born on 11 September 1885 in Brisbane, Queensland. His parents had migrated from Scotland circa 1880. His father was James Pearson Balsillie (a wholesale warehouseman) and his mother was Eliza Balsillie (née Johnston). His father died in 1889 when Graeme was 4 years old. The extended family was initially of some means and the lad was raised by his uncle. Graeme attended Brisbane Normal School and was by his own account a rebellious youth; however, his underlying brilliance was recognised and he continued his studies at Brisbane Grammar School. By 1901, the family finances were largely exhausted and he commenced work as a clerk in a warehouse, but continued his studies in the evening. At this time he met Edward Gustavus Campbell Barton, who was lecturing in all matters electrical at the local colleges, and no doubt developed Graeme's interests in both wireless telegraphy and rainmaking.

== Tertiary education ==
The family immigrated to London, England in 1903 and Graeme commenced formal studies in electrical engineering while working at the Armstrong-Whitworth workshops. Throughout this period, he was tutored by a cousin who was

== Australian Postmaster-General's Department ==
=== Preliminaries ===
Balsillie had come to the attention of the Australian Government as early as 1909. Following the Imperial Press Conference that year, then Postmaster-General John Quick asked that Captain Collins "secure an expert report on the value of the Balsillie system of wireless telegraphy."

=== Ancillary activities ===
As the Commonwealth Wireless Expert, Balsillie was frequently called upon to comment on the latest reported developments in wireless telegraphy and it was rare that he could not provide insight on the topic.

Despite his heavy commitments in establishing the coastal radio network, in November 1912 he was reported attending the Government House Garden Party.

Newspaper reports in July 1912 made much of statements that the Poulsen system was now achieving telegraphy rates at 100 words per minute at a time when the Australian system was achieving only 30 words per minute. Balsillie, having been employed by the Poulsen company some years earlier was able to state with authority that such high rates had actually been possible for some years, further that the high speeds required a complex photographic process for recording reception and that the rates could only be achieved for communication between two Poulsen stations, there being significant interoperability issues with other systems.

Balsillie was best man to Dr. Archie Hug in his wedding in April 1913 to Miss Doris Duckett.

On 3 August 1914, immediately before Australia's declaration of war, Balsillie was among a handful of senior Defence figures (including Major Reynolds, officer in charge of aviation, and Mr. T. Trumble, acting secretary of the Defence Department) providing advice to Prime Minister Joseph Cook as to Australia's preparedness while the entire cabinet made its way to Melbourne.

In April 1915, Balsillie was asked about reports from the wireless operators on board the SS Port Kembla that they had been entertained by gramophone musical selections from Boston while off New York. Balsillie responded that "music by wireless" was not new and that he was aware of the Poulsen system being used to transmit similar content from Berlin to Copenhagen several years ago.

During World War I, Balsillie volunteered for active service but was instead employed by the Defence Department in testing explosives.

=== Retirement ===
In September 1915, the wireless function was transferred to the Navy Department, together with the entire staff of the Wireless Section of the PMG's Department. This did not sit well with Balsillie and he took his retirement effective end of calendar year 1915, receiving a 2 months' salary gratuity.

== Shaw v Commonwealth ==
Father Archibald Shaw, of the Shaw Wireless Works made claim to being the actual inventor of Balsillie's Australian wireless system despite having been silent at the time of Balsillie's patent application. William Morris Hughes, the then Prime Minister, appointed Judge C. E. R. Murray, of the District Court Bench of New South Wales as a Royal Commissioner to report on the matters in dispute, but at the last moment, and after Mr Balsillie had engaged counsel, his Honour fell ill and resigned his commission. The Federal Government still intended to have the question tested, but encountered difficulty in securing the services of a judge.

== Rainmaking experiments ==
Balsillie's interest in rainmaking was seeded through his attendance at lectures by Edward Gustavus Campbell Barton at Brisbane educational institutions. As deployment of Australia's Coastal Radio network approached completion, his inventive thoughts turned towards rainmaking and in late 1913 he commenced rainmaking experiments outside Melbourne as a private venture. At first, it was attempted to keep the experiments secret but in late February 1914, news of the experiments leaked out and Balsillie was interviewed as to progress. Punch observed that "Balsillie, the Rainmaker, may be the greatest man Australia has produced. On the other hand, he may be merely a man of great ideas and optimism." In April 1914 he lodged an application for provisional letters patent with the Patents Commissioner which simply described the invention as a "means for causing precipitation of vapor contained in the atmosphere." This application required a comprehensive specification to be lodged within 9 months. Balsillie continued with his private experiments, but sought financial support for a wider trial. W. A. Holman, then Premier of New South Wales offered his government's support in April 1915, subject to favourable report by a scientific committee. The committee was announced in May 1915 as comprising chairman Professor T. W. E. David, of Sydney University, and members Professors Von Willer (Physics), Fawsitt (Chemistry), Cooke (Astronomy), Nadson (Electrical Engineering), and Messrs. O. W. Brain (Electrical Engineer New South Wales Tramways), and Corin (Electrical Engineer New South Wales Public Works Department). Balsillie travelled to Sydney in August 1915 and provided a limited laboratory demonstration of his equipment and process to the committee. Balsillie's employment with the Australian Government concluded in December 1915. The committee initially lent some cautious support to the project, but in December 1915 made known its negative preliminary findings and recommendation for further investigations to be undertaken. In March 1916 the committee was seeking further input from William Henry Bragg and Professor G. C. Simpson of Simla, India. The committee in its final report in October 1917 noted "In closing the investigation, the committee places on record the fact that no information whatever has been submitted for the consideration of the members which justifies the claim that any advance has been made in Australia in the direction of causing or increasing rainfall." Regardless, with Federal Government financial support, Balsillie had commenced wider experiments at Bookaloo Station northwest of Port Augusta, South Australia on the trans-Continental railway line and in June 1916 reported further limited success. Balsillie's continuing rainmaking experiments and use of public money for the purpose by June 1919 drew public ridicule and parallels to Jupiter Pluvius and St Swithin. Following questions on notice in the House of Representatives in March 1920, Balsillie's Hopetoun outcomes report dated 18 June 1919 was tabled. The report indicated that modest increased rainfall had been achieved from his experiments. The newly established Department of Science and Industry was tasked in August 1920 to investigate further the Balsillie experiments which supported the labelling of the Hughes government as spendthrift. It was also confirmed that as part of the funding for the Balsillie experiments, the Government was to receive royalty-free use of the associated patents. In August 1923, in response to a further question on notice, the Government advised that a total of £6,000 had been expended in the experiments.

== Personal life ==
Balsillie was exceedingly open with reporters enquiring about his various experiments and inventions, and the newspapers of the day are filled with detailed descriptions; but little is known of his personal life. He married Carmen Poleyh in 1909. He had a love of horse racing and is reported with other notables attending the Melbourne Cup at Flemington in November 1915. While developing his motor vehicle headlight patent in Cincinnati on 10 July 1924 he died of nephritis at the young age of 39 years (like his father).

== Late life and legacy ==
Balsillie is undoubtedly the father of wireless telegraphy and broadcasting in Australia, yet his substantial contribution is largely overlooked or forgotten. After a decade of procrastination and indecision by the Commonwealth in relation to wireless, he provided his Australian Wireless System free of royalty in Australia and used it in the timely and cost-effective establishment of a wide network of coastal radio stations around Australia over only two years during the period 1911 to 1913. That network provided great protection for the new nation during World War I, enabling the co-ordination of its naval fleet while operating in Australian and nearby waters. But as is the case for many inventive geniuses, he is remembered more for his failings and controversies than his successes. His earlier invention of the Balsillie system of wireless was deemed an infringement of one of Marconi's patents. He successfully defended his patents for the Australian system of wireless against further action by Marconi, only to have the invention claimed by another Australian wireless pioneer (which claim was never tested in the courts). His experiments in rainmaking by wireless we see with a century of hindsight as foolish and invoked derision for himself and embarrassment for his supporters, permanently tainting his legacy. But barely a decade prior, wireless itself was viewed as almost magic. His early passing precluded further development of inventions. The takeover of the coastal radio network by Amalgamated Wireless (Australasia) ultimately led to a suppression of Balsillie's pioneering role.

== Publications ==
- Jenvey, H. W. Practical telegraphy : a guide for the use of officers of the Victorian Post and Telegraph Department. vol. 1 (2nd edition Melbourne, 1891) Trove
