= 1909 Moreton state by-election =

The 1909 Moreton state by-election was a by-election held on 19 June 1909 for the Queensland Legislative Assembly seat of Moreton, based to the north of Brisbane.

The by-election was triggered by the death of Ministerial member John Dunmore Campbell on 27 May 1909. Campbell had held the seat since 1899. He was a minister in the short-lived Second Philp Ministry prior to the 1908 election.

The seat, later known as Murrumba, was based in Caboolture and included all of Moreton Bay Region (now the City of Moreton Bay), the former City of Caloundra and the towns of Nambour and Eumundi.

== Timeline ==
| Date | Event |
|---|---|
| 27 May 1909 | John Dunmore Campbell died, vacating the seat of Moreton. |
| 29 May 1909 | Writs were issued by the Lieutenant-Governor of Queensland to proceed with a by-election. |
| 5 June 1909 | Close of nominations and draw of ballot papers. |
| 19 June 1909 | Polling day, between the hours of 8am and 5pm. |
| 26 June 1909 | The writ was returned and the results formally declared. |

== Results ==
James Forsythe retained the seat for the Ministerial party.

Moreton state by-election, 1909
| Party | Candidate | Votes | % | ±% |
|---|---|---|---|---|
| Ministerialist | James Forsythe | 1,728 | 55.97 | –11.78 |
| Labor | James Denny | 743 | 24.06 | +24.06 |
| Ind. Ministerialist | William Joyner | 616 | 19.95 | +19.95 |
| Turnout | | 3,087 | 78.55 | +0.65 |
| Ministerialist hold | | Swing | –11.78 | |
