= Arthur Charles Cooper =

Australian politician

Arthur Cooper

Member of the Queensland Legislative Assembly for Mitchell
- In office 11 March 1902 – 14 April 1905
- Preceded by: Charles Fitzgerald
- Succeeded by: John Payne

Personal details
- Born: Arthur Charles Cooper; May 1864 London, England
- Died: 1 October 1921 (aged 57) Norwich, England
- Party: Ministerial
- Education: Trinity College, Dublin
- Occupation: Sheep station manager

Arthur Charles Cooper (May 1864 – 1 October 1921) was a member of the Queensland Legislative Assembly.

== Biography ==
Cooper was born in London, the son of Edward Henry Cooper and his wife Charlotte Maria (née Mills). He graduated from Trinity College, Dublin and went to South Africa where he served with Sir Charles Warren's Buchuanaland Expedition in 1884-1885 and with the Connaught Rangers against the Boer forces. He came to Queensland in 1886 and acquired Weewondilla Station at Longreach in 1889.

He returned to England in 1905, inherited a large fortune, and lived at Gissing Hall, Norfolk. He died in Norwich in October 1921.

== Public life ==
Cooper, a Ministerialist, represented the seat of Mitchell from 1902 until he resigned in 1905 to return to England.

Parliament of Queensland
Preceded by Charles Fitzgerald	Member for Mitchell; 1902–1905	Succeeded by John Payne
