= Hiram Wakefield =

Australian politician

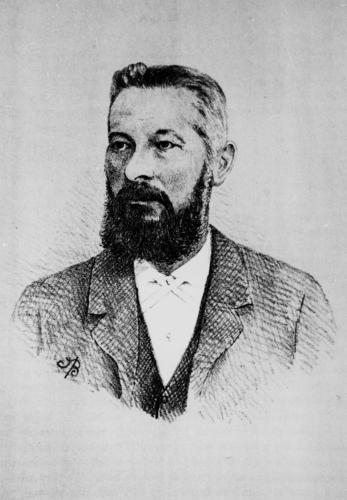

Member of the Queensland Legislative Assembly for Moreton
- In office 13 May 1885 – 17 May 1888
- Preceded by: Thomas Macdonald-Paterson
- Succeeded by: Matthew Battersby

Personal details
- Born: Hiram Wakefield; 7 May 1837 Bristol, England
- Died: 25 June 1905 (aged 68) Brisbane, Queensland, Australia
- Resting place: Toowong Cemetery
- Spouse: Margaret Birch (m.1861 d.1898)
- Occupation: Businessman

Hiram Wakefield (7 May 1837 – 25 June 1905) was a member of the Queensland Legislative Assembly.

== Biography ==
Wakefield was born in Bristol, England, the son of James Wakefield and his wife Hannah (née Sanigar). He was educated in Bristol and after arriving in Australia in 1855 was running a successful iron importing and plumbing business in Brisbane by 1857. In 1877 he invested 2,000 pounds into the Townsville ice works.

On 29 March 1861 Wakefield married Margaret Birch (died 1898) and together had three sons and four daughters. He died in June 1905 and his funeral proceeded from the New Farm residence of his daughter to the Toowong Cemetery.

== Public career ==
Wakefield began his political life as an alderman on the Sandgate Town Council in 1881 becoming the town's mayor in 1887, a role in which he served for two years.

In 1885, the member for Moreton in the Queensland Legislative Assembly, Thomas Macdonald-Paterson resigned after being appointed to the Queensland Legislative Council. At the ensuing by-election, Wakefield easily defeated George Raff to become the new member. He did not stand for re-election at the 1888 Queensland colonial election.

Parliament of Queensland
Preceded by Thomas Macdonald-Paterson	Member for Moreton; 1885–1888	Succeeded by Matthew Battersby
