= Electoral district of Moreton =

Moreton Queensland—Legislative Assembly
- State: Queensland
- Created: 1878
- Abolished: 1912
- Namesake: Moreton Bay
- Demographic: Rural
- Coordinates: 27°14′S 153°02′E

The electoral district of Moreton was a Legislative Assembly electorate in the state of Queensland. It was first created in a redistribution ahead of the 1878 colonial election, and existed until the 1912 state election.

Moreton replaced the former district of East Moreton, James Francis Garrick being the last member for East Moreton.

Moreton was abolished in 1912, replaced by the Electoral district of Murrumba.

== Members for Moreton ==
Member	Party	Term
James Garrick		Nov 1878 – Nov 1883
Thomas Macdonald-Paterson	Ministerialist	Nov 1883 – Apr 1885
Hiram Wakefield		Apr 1885 – May 1888
Matthew Battersby	Ministerialist	May 1888 – Mar 1899
John Campbell	Ministerialist	Apr 1899 – May 1909
James Forsyth	Opposition	Jun 1909 – Apr 1912

Forsyth went on to represent Murrumba from April 1912 to March 1918.

== See also ==
- 1909 Moreton state by-election
- Electoral districts of Queensland
- Members of the Queensland Legislative Assembly by year
- Category:Members of the Queensland Legislative Assembly by name
