= Edward Barrow Forrest =

Australian politician (1838–1914)

The Honourable Edward Forrest
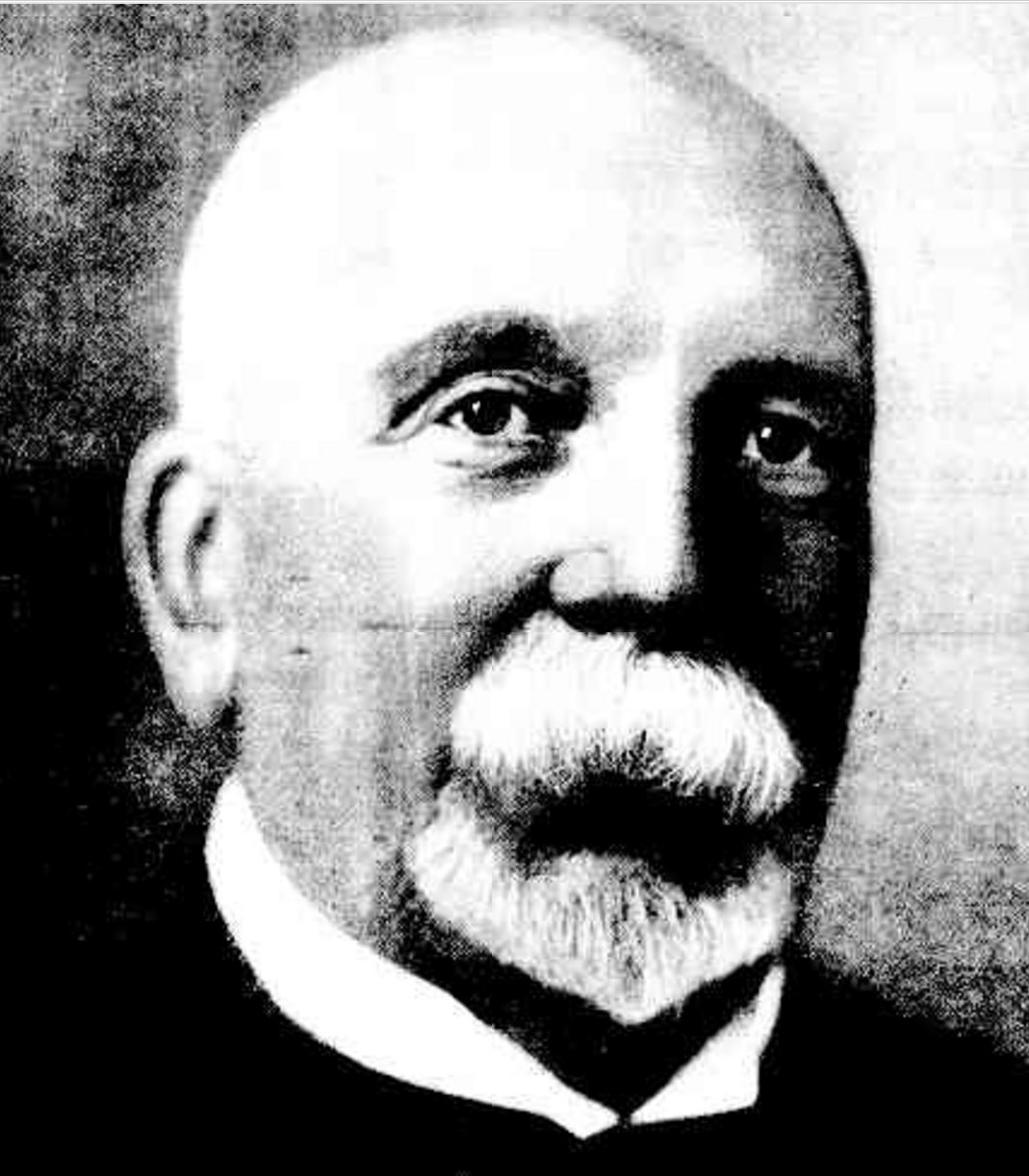
- Edward Barrow Forrest, 1907

Member of the Queensland Legislative Assembly for Brisbane North
- In office 20 April 1899 – 27 April 1912 Serving with Thomas MacDonald-Paterson, John Cameron, Edward Barton, Edward Macartney, Thomas Welsby
- Preceded by: Robert Fraser
- Succeeded by: Seat Abolished

Member of the Queensland Legislative Council
- In office 15 August 1882 – 8 March 1899
- In office 14 June 1913 – 30 March 1914

Personal details
- Born: Edward Barrow Forrest; February 1838 Windemere, Westmorland, England
- Died: 30 March 1914 (aged 76) Brisbane, Queensland, Australia
- Resting place: Toowong Cemetery
- Party: Ministerial
- Other political affiliations: Opposition
- Spouse: Elizabeth Leary
- Occupation: Businessman, vice consul for france

Edward Barrow Forrest (February 1838 – 30 March 1914) was an Australian company director and politician, a member of the Queensland Legislative Council and the Queensland Legislative Assembly.

== Early life ==
Forrest was born in Windermere, Westmorland, England. He was brought to Sydney in 1852 where educated by his uncle Rev. William Forrest at The King's School, Parramatta, New South Wales.

== Business interests ==
Forrest's first position was with the Colonial Sugar Refining Company, with which he remained connected throughout most of his life, being for many years their Queensland director. In 1872 he came to Brisbane to work for the firm of Parbury, Lamb & Co., rising to be managing partner in Queensland. He was a director of the Australia Mutual Permanent Society, Brisbane Gas Company, the Imperial Insurance Company, the Queensland Investment Company, the North British and Mercantile Insurance Company, the Castlemaine Brewery, the Federal Bank and Building Society, and Quinlan, Gray and Co Limited.

== Politics ==
Forrest was appointed to the Queensland Legislative Council, being sworn in on 15 August 1882. Subsequently, he was appointed one of the commissioners to inquire into the working of the Colonial Stores Office.

Forrest resigned from the Legislative Council on 8 March 1899 and represented Brisbane North in the Legislative Assembly from 20 April 1899 to 27 April 1912; he was again a member of the Legislative Council from 14 June 1913 until his death on 30 March 1914.

Forrest was appointed the Vice-Consul for France in 1872, an appointment he held until shortly before his death.

== Personal life ==
Forrest was a keen yachtsman and the owner of the Isabel, the fastest yacht in Queensland waters. He was vice-commodore of the Brisbane Sailing Club. He was one of the founders of the Queensland Yacht Club of which he was president for many years.

On 29 April 1861, Forrest married Elizabeth Mary Leary at St Mary's Roman Catholic Cathedral and at St Paul's Church of England in Cleveland Street, Redfern. The couple had eight children.

Forrest died in St Helen's Private Hospital in Brisbane on Monday 30 March 1914 following an illness of several months. At his request, Forrest was buried in a private ceremony at Toowong Cemetery.

Parliament of Queensland
Preceded by Robert Fraser	Member for Brisbane North; 1899–1912; Served alongside: Thomas MacDonald-Paterson, John Cameron, Edward Barton, Edward Macartney, Thomas Welsby	Abolished
