= Edward Macartney =

Australian politician (1863–1956)

Sir Edward Macartney
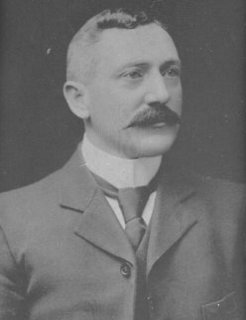

Leader of the Opposition of Queensland
- In office 24 June 1915 – 8 September 1915
- Preceded by: T. J. Ryan
- Succeeded by: James Tolmie
- In office 15 February 1918 – 28 January 1920
- Preceded by: James Tolmie
- Succeeded by: William Vowles

Member of the Queensland Legislative Assembly for Toowong
- In office 24 November 1900 – 5 February 1908
- Preceded by: Thomas Finney
- Succeeded by: Richard Cottell
- In office 16 September 1911 – 9 October 1920
- Preceded by: Richard Cottell
- Succeeded by: James Maxwell

Member of the Queensland Legislative Assembly for Brisbane North
- In office 2 October 1909 – 15 September 1911 Serving with Edward Forrest
- Preceded by: Edward Barton
- Succeeded by: Thomas Welsby

Personal details
- Born: Edward Henry Macartney; 24 January 1863 Holywood, County Down, Ireland
- Died: 24 February 1956 (aged 93) Brisbane, Queensland, Australia
- Party: National
- Other political affiliations: Ministerialist, Opposition Party, Queensland Liberal
- Spouse: Caroline Tottenham Lucas Cardew (m.1888 d.1949)
- Occupation: Business manager, Solicitor

Sir Edward Henry Macartney (24 January 1863 – 24 February 1956) was a solicitor, company director and a member of the Queensland Legislative Assembly.

== Early years ==
Macartney was born in Holywood, County Down, Ireland, to parents William Isaac Macartney, who was a former commissioner of police in Ceylon, and his Scottish wife, Henrietta (née Dare). Educated at Holywood, Enniskillen, Gracehill and Dublin, he worked for four years in Ireland before, along with his brother, the ship's surgeon, arriving in Brisbane aboard the SS Bulimba on 20 March 1883. On his arrival, Macartney is said to have spent a short time as a jackaroo before beginning work with the National Australia Bank, working at Maryborough, Ipswich, Normanton and Townsville until 1885.

After 1885, Macartney took up work as an articled clerk for solicitors Thynne & Goertz, being admitted as a solicitor in 1891. When Thynne & Goertz was dissolved in 1893, he became Thynne's business partner and together developed a strong practice, specializing in commercial matters.

== Political career ==
Macartney's first experience in politics was as a wardsman in the Shire of Ithaca from 1899 until 1903 including being its president in 1900. In that same year, as the Ministerialist candidate, he stood for the state seat of Toowong in a by-election to replace the retiring Thomas Finney. He defeated the Labor candidate, Arthur Lilley, son of the former Queensland Premier, Sir Charles Lilley, by 960 votes to 766. In 1908, Macartney, by now a member of the Opposition, was defeated by Richard Cottell at that year's snap election.

The next year, another state election was held, and Macartney, a Kidstonian candidate, won the two-member seat of Brisbane North. In 1911, the member for Toowong, Cottell, suddenly died. Macartney resigned as the member for Brisbane North to stand at the upcoming by-election and defeated the ALP candidate, John Gilday, by 2781 votes to 2163. He held the seat for a further nine years until his retirement from politics in 1920.

Macartney was Secretary for Public Lands from 7 February 1911 until 11 December 1912 and served as Leader of the Opposition twice: in 1915 and again from 1918 to 1920. Although a speaker of no more than average ability, and regarded as being overly sensitive to criticism, he chaired several committees and exerted considerable parliamentary power from 1902 onwards. He argued for one vote, one value, took a keen interest in electoral redistributions, and in 1905 introduced legislation against juvenile smoking.

From 1915 until his retirement from parliament, Macartney was at loggerheads with the ALP Government, which condemned him as a representative of monopolies and the money power. Premier T. J. Ryan and Macartney bitterly disliked one another. Macartney accused Ryan of having personally profited from legal cases while he was attorney-general. Such was the ALP's overt disdain for Macartney that in 1916, the Government introduced a constitutional bill designed to disqualify solicitors who acted 'for monopoly companies or alien companies' from being members of parliament which became popularly known as the 'Thynne and Macartney disabling bill.'

== Later years ==
After Macartney resigned from Parliament in 1920 due to health issues, he returned to his legal practice. He also became chairman of directors of Swift Australian Co. Pty Ltd and the local board of the National Bank of Australasia Ltd. He was also a director of Finney Isles & Co. Ltd, Queensland Newspapers Pty Ltd and British Traders' Insurance Co. Ltd. He was appointed Agent-General for Queensland in London by the Moore Government in 1929, holding the position for two years.

== Personal life ==
Macartney married Caroline Tottenham Lucas Cardew, the daughter of a police magistrate, in July 1888 and together had two sons. A keen golfer, he was president of the Brisbane Golf Club and a committee-member of the Queensland Club for six years.

Knighted in 1930, Macartney died in Brisbane in February 1956 and was cremated. His wife and sons had predeceased him.

Political offices
Preceded by T. J. Ryan	Leader of the Opposition of Queensland; 1915	Succeeded by James Tolmie
Preceded by James Tolmie	Leader of the Opposition of Queensland; 1918-1920	Succeeded by William Vowles
Parliament of Queensland
Preceded by Thomas Finney	Member for Toowong; 1900–1908	Succeeded by Richard Cottell
Preceded by Edward Barton	Member for Brisbane North; 1909–1911; Served alongside: Edward Forrest	Succeeded by Thomas Welsby
Preceded by Richard Cottell	Member for Toowong; 1911–1920	Succeeded by James Maxwell
