= Thomas Macdonald-Paterson =

Australian politician (1844–1906)

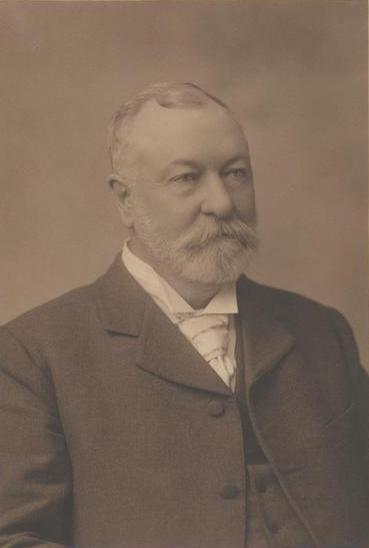

Member of the Australian Parliament for Brisbane
- In office 30 March 1901 – 16 December 1903
- Preceded by: New seat
- Succeeded by: Millice Culpin

Member of the Queensland Legislative Assembly for Rockhampton
- In office 15 November 1878 – 17 August 1883 Serving with William Rea, John Ferguson
- Preceded by: New seat
- Succeeded by: William Higson

Member of the Queensland Legislative Assembly for Moreton
- In office 21 November 1883 – 21 April 1885
- Preceded by: James Garrick
- Succeeded by: Hiram Wakefield

Member of the Queensland Legislative Assembly for Brisbane North
- In office 21 March 1896 – 31 July 1901 Serving with Robert Fraser, Edward Forrest
- Preceded by: Thomas McIlwraith
- Succeeded by: John Cameron

Member of the Queensland Legislative Council
- In office 22 April 1885 – 11 March 1896

Personal details
- Born: 9 May 1844 Glasgow, Scotland
- Died: 21 March 1906 (aged 61) Brisbane, Queensland, Australia
- Resting place: Toowong Cemetery
- Party: Protectionist (1901–03); Independent (1903)
- Other political affiliations: Ministerialist
- Spouse: Maria Clarissa Pitts
- Occupation: Lawyer

Thomas Macdonald-Paterson (9 May 1844 – 21 March 1906) was an Australian politician, a member of the Parliament of Queensland, and later, the Parliament of Australia.

== Early life ==
Macdonald-Paterson was born in Glasgow, Scotland, he was educated there privately before migrating to Australia in 1861, where he became a butcher, speculator and lawyer.

== Politics ==
In 1878 he was elected to the Legislative Assembly of Queensland as the member for Rockhampton; he transferred to Moreton in 1883 and to the Legislative Council in 1885, remaining there until 1887. He was a delegate to the Federation Convention of 1891, and returned to the Legislative Assembly in 1896 as the member for North Brisbane.

In 1901 he transferred to federal politics, winning the Australian House of Representatives seat of Brisbane. Although there was no protectionist organisation in Queensland, he joined the Protectionist Party when the parliament sat. In 1903, the National Liberal Union (a protectionist organisation) endorsed another candidate William Morse in Brisbane, and the division of the protectionist vote allowed a Labor candidate Millice Culpin to defeat Macdonald-Paterson.

== Later life ==
He died in 1906 and was buried in Toowong Cemetery.

Parliament of Australia
Preceded by New seat	Member for Brisbane; 1901 – 1903	Succeeded by Millice Culpin
Parliament of Queensland
New seat	Member for Rockhampton; 1878 – 1883; Served alongside: William Rea, John Ferguson	Succeeded by William Higson
Preceded by James Garrick	Member for Moreton; 1883 – 1885	Succeeded by Hiram Wakefield
Preceded by Thomas McIlwraith	Member for Brisbane North; 1896 – 1901; Served alongside: Robert Fraser, Edward Forrest	Succeeded by John Cameron
