= Richard John Cottell =

Australian politician

Richard Cottell
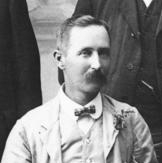
- Richard John Cottell, Member of the Queensland Legislative Assembly, 1908

Member of the Queensland Legislative Assembly for Toowong
- In office 5 February 1908 – 30 August 1911
- Preceded by: Edward Macartney
- Succeeded by: Edward Macartney

Personal details
- Born: Richard John Cottell; 6 August 1865 Brisbane, Australia
- Died: 30 August 1911 (aged 46) Brisbane, Australia
- Resting place: Toowong Cemetery
- Party: Kidstonites
- Other political affiliations: Opposition
- Spouse(s): Mary Barry (m.1889 d.1890), Lily Theresa Muller (m.1897)
- Occupation: Clerk, Conveyancer

Richard John Cottell (1865–1911) was an Australian politician. He was a Member of the Queensland Legislative Assembly and a mayor of the Town of Toowong (now part of the City of Brisbane).

== Early life ==
Richard John Cottell was born on 6 August 1865 in Brisbane. His parents were Richard James Cottell (later the mayor of the Town of Roma) and his wife Catherine Naire (née Cameron).

Subsequently his parents moved to Roma and he received his early education at the local State school, but subsequently was a pupil of the Ipswich Grammar School. In 1880 he commenced a mercantile career in the service of Messrs. B. D. Morehead and Co., and subsequently served a term with Messrs. Alfred Shaw and Co., afterwards entering the Government service in the office of the Registrar of Titles, Brisbane. In 1880 he qualified as a conveyancer of the Supreme Court of Queensland, and practised as such in Brisbane.

On 26 February 1889, he married Mary (Minnie) Barry, daughter of Patrick Barry and Honora (née Donovan). They had a son, Richard Barry Cottell, on 11 July 1890 but his wife died soon after 8 August 1890 aged 26 years old. Son Richard died aged 15 months on 28 October 1891. His wife and son were both buried in Lutwyche Cemetery, but not together. His wife was buried in the Roman Catholic section and his son in the Church of England section.

On 22 April 1897, he married Lily Theresa Muller, daughter of Frederick Augustus Muller and Margaret Elizabeth (née Johanson). They had three children:

- Lorna Muller (born 21 July 1898), an artist
- Francis Roy (born 24 September 1900)
- Phyllis Lily (born 12 December 1903)

== Political life ==
Richard Cottell was the councillor for the South Ward of the Town of Toowong from 6 January 1904 to his death on 30 August 1911. He was mayor of the Town of Toowong in 1909.

On 5 February 1908, Richard Cottell was elected to the Queensland Legislative Assembly in the electoral district of Toowong. He held the seat until his death on 30 August 1911.

== Death ==
Richard Cottell died on 30 August 1911 at his residence in Curlew Street, Toowong, from angina pectoris aged 46 years old. He was buried in Toowong Cemetery on 31 August 1911.

His second wife Lily died on 15 April 1942 aged 72 years and was buried with her husband in Toowong Cemetery.

Parliament of Queensland
Preceded by Edward Macartney	Member for Toowong; 1908–1911	Succeeded by Edward Macartney
