= Thomas Finney (politician) =

Australian businessman and politician

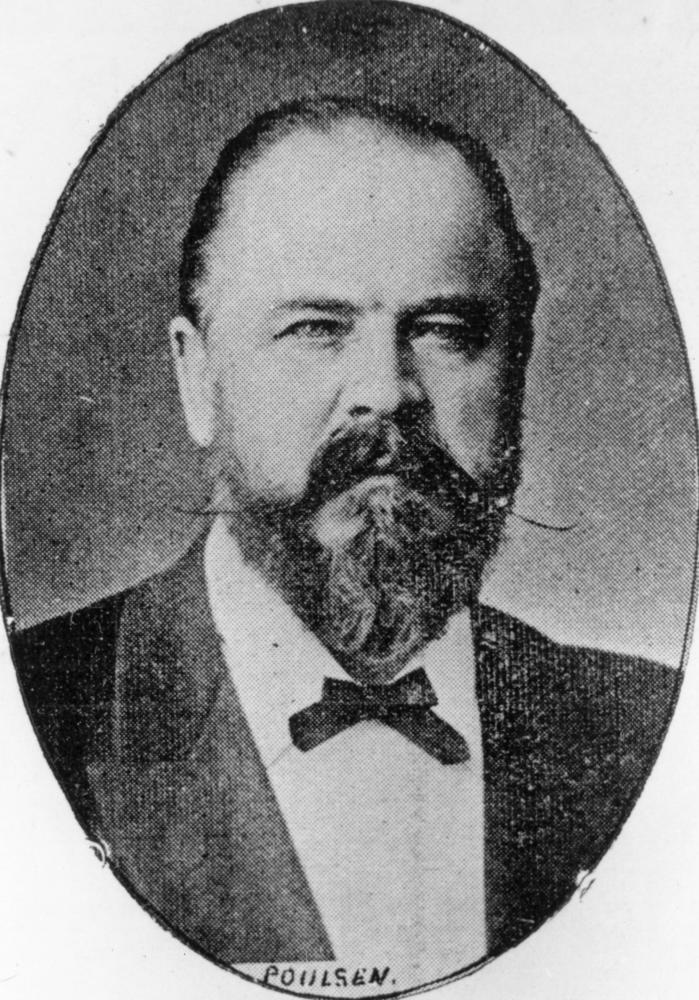
- Thomas Finney ca. 1896.

Member of the Queensland Legislative Assembly for Toowong
- In office 11 March 1896 – 5 October 1900
- Preceded by: Matthew Reid
- Succeeded by: Edward Macartney

Personal details
- Born: Thomas Finney; 10 January 1837 Tuam, Galway, Ireland
- Died: 16 December 1903 (aged 66) Brisbane, Queensland, Australia
- Resting place: Toowong Cemetery
- Party: Ministerialist
- Occupation: Businessman

Thomas Finney (1837–1903) was an Australian businessman and politician. He represented the electoral district of Toowong in the Legislative Assembly of Queensland from 1896 until 1900.

== Biography ==
Thomas Finney was born 10 January 1837 at Currakeen House, Tuam, Galway, Ireland. His father was Thomas Finney and his mother was Eliza Finney, née Cornwall. He began work at a drapery shop in 1856, and in 1862 emigrated to Brisbane, Queensland with his partner James Isles.

The two started a drapery business, Finney Isles & Co., which was extremely successful. In 1869 the company had branches in Rockhampton and Gympie, and by 1873 it had expanded into the areas of tailoring, furniture, furnishing, and hardware.

In 1879, Finney pioneered 6 p.m. closing in Brisbane stores. In 1885, with other firms, he instituted 1 p.m. closing on Saturdays and even after other firms reverted to the old Saturday hours of 8 a.m. to 11 p.m, Finney continued it. A charity fund of the employees was subsidized £ for £ by the management and was administered by a committee that included the managing director and two employees elected by the staff.

The business suffered severely in 1893 from flood waters and from the financial crisis, but soon recovered.

At some point Finney was elected to the Toowong Shire Council, and in 1896 he won the electoral district of Toowong and was seated in the Legislative Assembly of Queensland, holding his seat until his resignation in 1902.

Finney married three times. On 22 May 1864, he was wed to Kate Pringle Little, but she died after two years and he married Sidney Anne Jackson, whose sister married Finney's business partner, James Isles. Finney and Sidney had two daughters and a son together, and she died on 13 October 1883. In 1901, while in England, Finney married Janet Edgar Farrow, a widow.

He died on 16 December 1903 and was buried in Toowong Cemetery.

Parliament of Queensland
Preceded by Matthew Reid	Member for Toowong; 1896–1900	Succeeded by Edward Macartney
