= Electoral district of Brisbane North =

Former electoral district of Queensland

Brisbane North Queensland—Legislative Assembly
- State: Queensland
- Created: 1888
- Abolished: 1912
- Demographic: Metropolitan

Brisbane North was an electoral district which elected two members to the Legislative Assembly of Queensland in the Australian state of Queensland from 1888 until 1912. It replaced the electoral district of North Brisbane.

Following the Electoral Districts Act 1910, which attempted to apply one vote one value to Queensland electorates, Brisbane North was split into the seats of Brisbane and Paddington.

== Members for Brisbane North ==
The members for Brisbane North were:

Member 1	Party	Term	Member 2	Party	Term
Samuel Griffith	Liberal	1888–1890	Thomas McIlwraith	Conservative	1888–1890
Samuel Griffith	Ministerialist	1890–1893	Thomas McIlwraith	Ministerialist	1890–1896
John James Kingsbury	Ministerialist	1893–1896	Thomas McIlwraith	Ministerialist	1890–1896
Robert Fraser	Ministerialist	1896–1899	Thomas MacDonald-Paterson	Ministerialist	1896–1901
Edward Barrow Forrest	Ministerialist	1899–1903	Thomas MacDonald-Paterson	Ministerialist	1896–1901
Edward Barrow Forrest	Ministerialist	1899–1903	John Cameron	Conservative	1901–1908
Edward Barrow Forrest	Conservative	1903–1909	John Cameron	Conservative	1901–1908
Edward Barrow Forrest	Conservative	1903–1909	Edward Barton	Kidstonites	1908–1909
Edward Barrow Forrest	Liberal	1909–1912	Edward Macartney	Liberal	1909–1911
Edward Barrow Forrest	Liberal	1909–1912	Thomas Welsby	Liberal	1911–1912

== See also ==
- Electoral districts of Queensland
- Members of the Queensland Legislative Assembly by year
- Category:Members of the Queensland Legislative Assembly by name
