= Electoral district of Toowong =

State electoral district of Queensland, Australia

Toowong Queensland—Legislative Assembly
- State: Queensland
- Created: 1888
- Abolished: 1992
- Namesake: Toowong

Toowong was an electoral district of the Legislative Assembly in the Australian state of Queensland from 1888 to 1992. It was centred on the Northern Brisbane suburb of Toowong.

Redistributions over the years extended Toowong toward Mt Coot-tha and Moggill, and it shrank back toward the populated areas when Mt Coot-tha was given its own district.

Toowong was abolished in the 1991 redistribution, and its territories were absorbed into the districts of Mt Coot-tha and Indooroopilly.

== Members for Toowong ==
Member	Party	Term
Theodore Unmack		1888–1893
Matthew Reid	Labour	1893–1896
Thomas Finney	Ministerialist	1896–1900
Edward Macartney	Ministerialist	1900–1908
Richard John Cottell	Ministerialist	1908–1911
Edward Macartney	Liberal	1911–1918
Edward Macartney	National	1918–1920
James Maxwell	National	1920–1922
James Maxwell	United	1922–1925
James Maxwell	CPNP	1925–1938
Harry Massey	United Australia	1938–1944
Charles Wanstall	QPP	1944–1950
Alan Munro	Liberal	1950–1966
Charles Porter	Liberal	1966–1980
Ian Prentice	Liberal	1980–1983
Earle Bailey	National	1983–1986
Denver Beanland	Liberal	1986–1992

== See also ==
- Electoral districts of Queensland
- Members of the Queensland Legislative Assembly by year
- Category:Members of the Queensland Legislative Assembly by name
