= 1896 Queensland colonial election =

- 10 March – 11 April 1896

All 72 seats in the Legislative Assembly 37 Assembly seats were needed for a majority
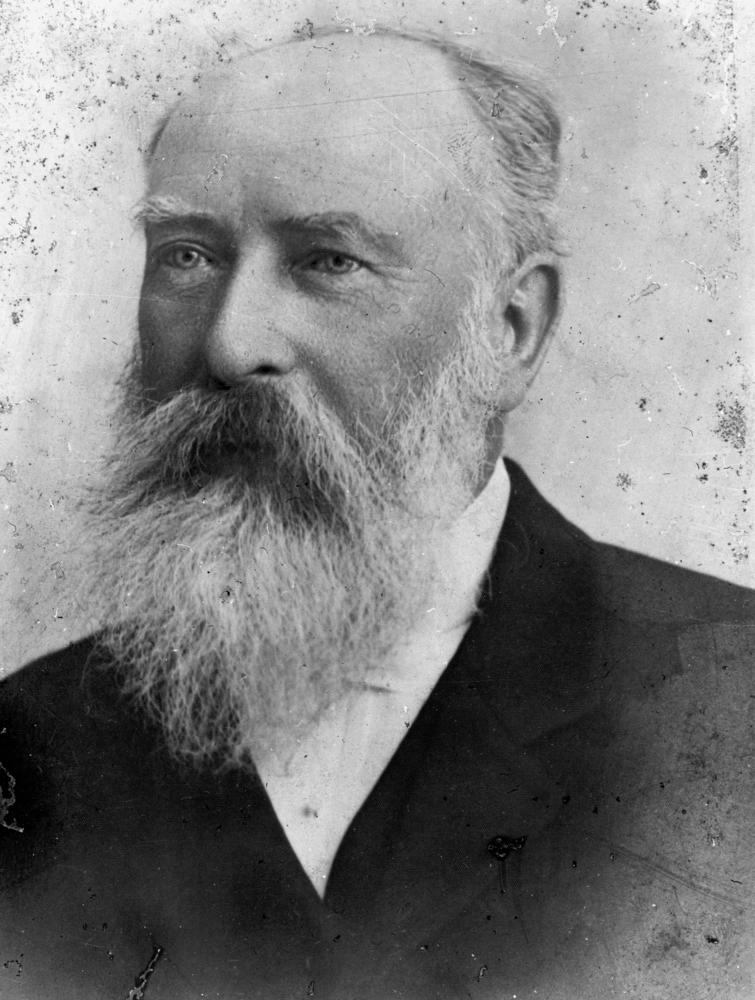

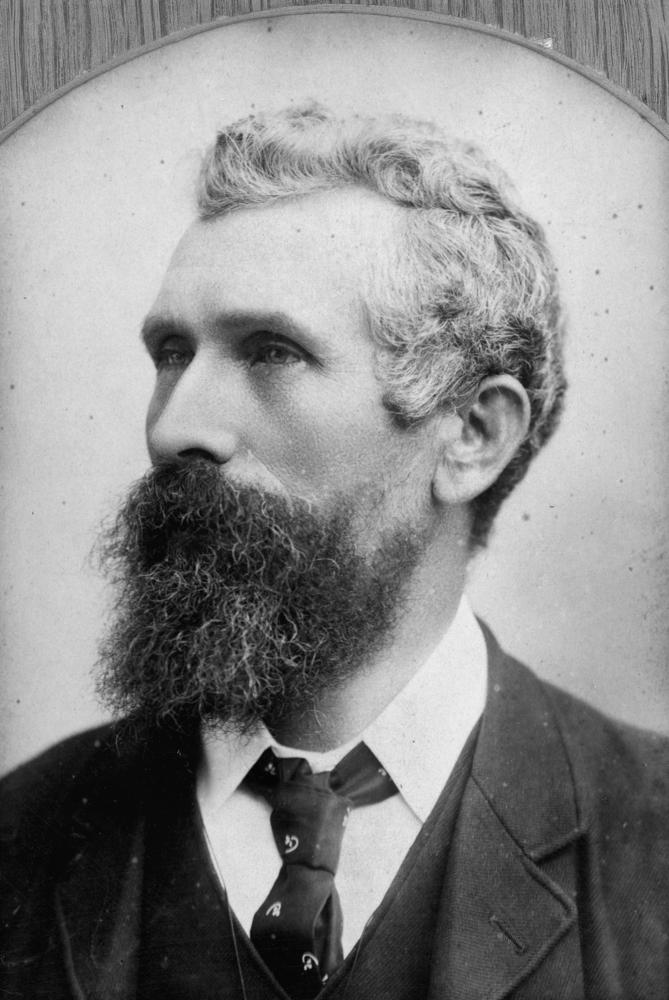

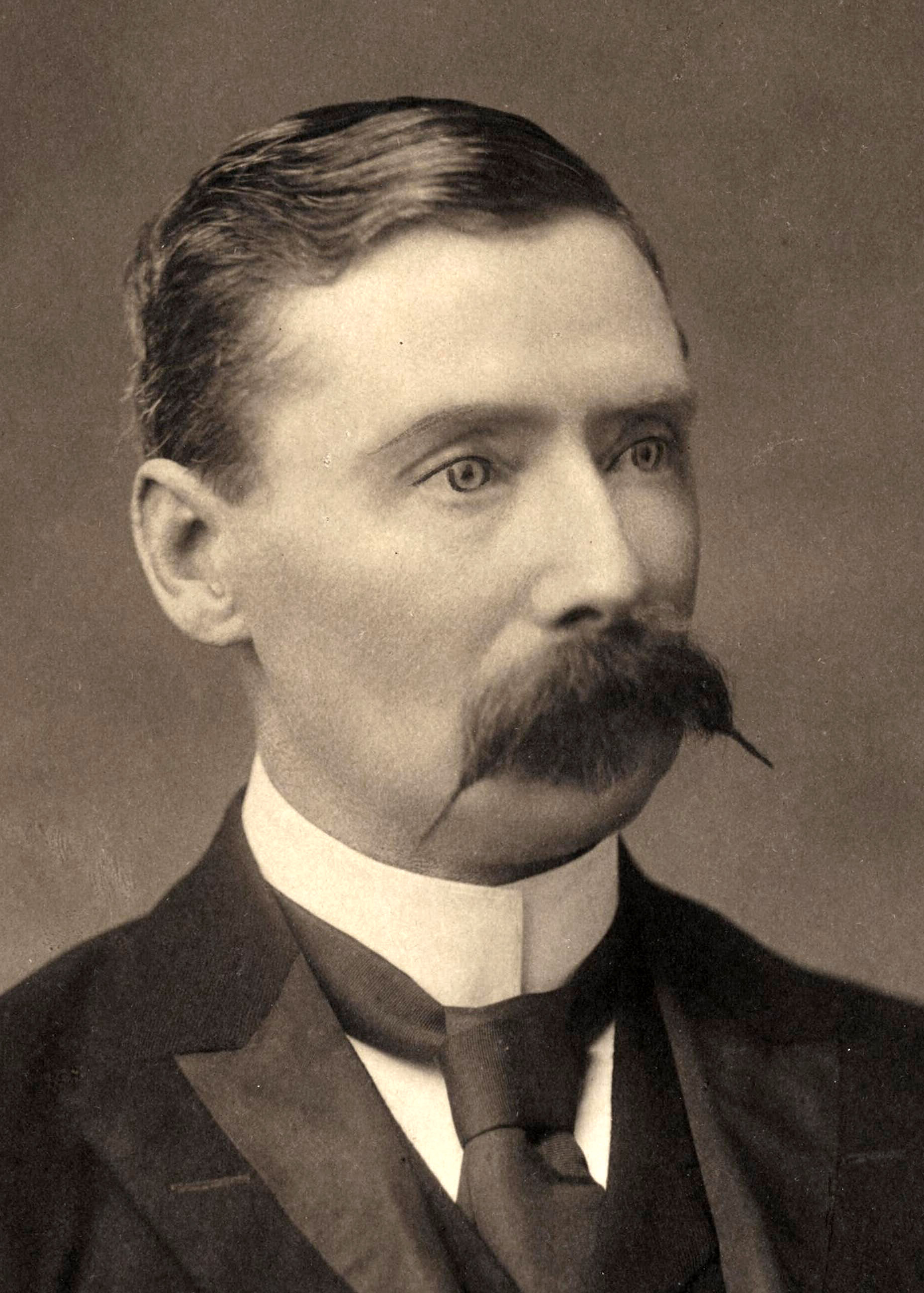
	First party	Second party	Third party
Leader	Hugh Nelson	Thomas Glassey	J. G. Drake
Party	Ministerial	Labour	Opposition
Leader since			29 June 1896
Leader's seat	Murilla	Bundaberg	Enoggera
Last election	42 seats, 44.78%	16 seats, 33.32%	7 seats, 9.17%
Seats won	41	20	8
Seat change	▼1	▲4	▲1
Popular vote	39,088	28,581	8,472
Percentage	47.82%	34.97%	10.37%
Swing	▲3.04	▲1.65	▲1.19
- Legislative Assembly after the election
Premier before election
Hugh Nelson
Ministerial
Elected Premier
Hugh Nelson
Ministerial

Elections were held in the Colony of Queensland between 10 March 1896 and 11 April 1896 to elect the members of the colony’s Legislative Assembly.

This election used contingent voting, at least in the single-member districts.

Five districts were two-seat districts - Mackay, Marlborough, North Brisbane, Rockhampton and South Brisbane. In the two-member constituencies, plurality block voting was used -- electors could cast two valid votes but were allowed to "plump".

== Key dates ==
Due to problems of distance and communications, it was not possible to hold the elections on a single day.

== Results ==

↓
41	20	8	3
Ministerialists	Labour	Opposition	Other

Queensland state election, 11 March 1896 Legislative Assembly << 1893–1899 >>
Enrolled voters	86,882				
Votes cast	61,453		Turnout	76.84	
Informal votes	765		Informal		
Summary of votes by party
Party	Primary votes	%	Swing	Seats	Change
Ministerialist	39,088	47.82	+3.04	41	–2
Labour	28,581	34.97	+1.65	20	+4
Opposition	8,472	10.37	+1.19	8	+1
Independent	3,608	4.41	–5.72	2	–5
Farmers' Representative	1,985	2.43	+0.85	1	+1
Total	81,734			72	

== See also ==
- Members of the Queensland Legislative Assembly, 1896–1899
