= 1893 Queensland colonial election =

- 18 April – 25 May 1893

All 72 seats in the Legislative Assembly 37 Assembly seats were needed for a majority
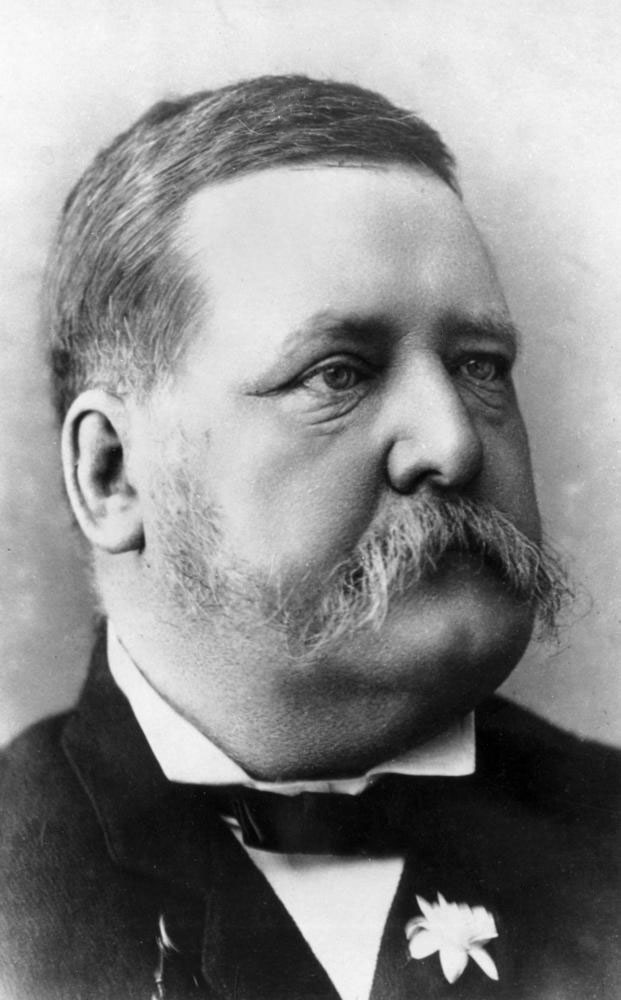

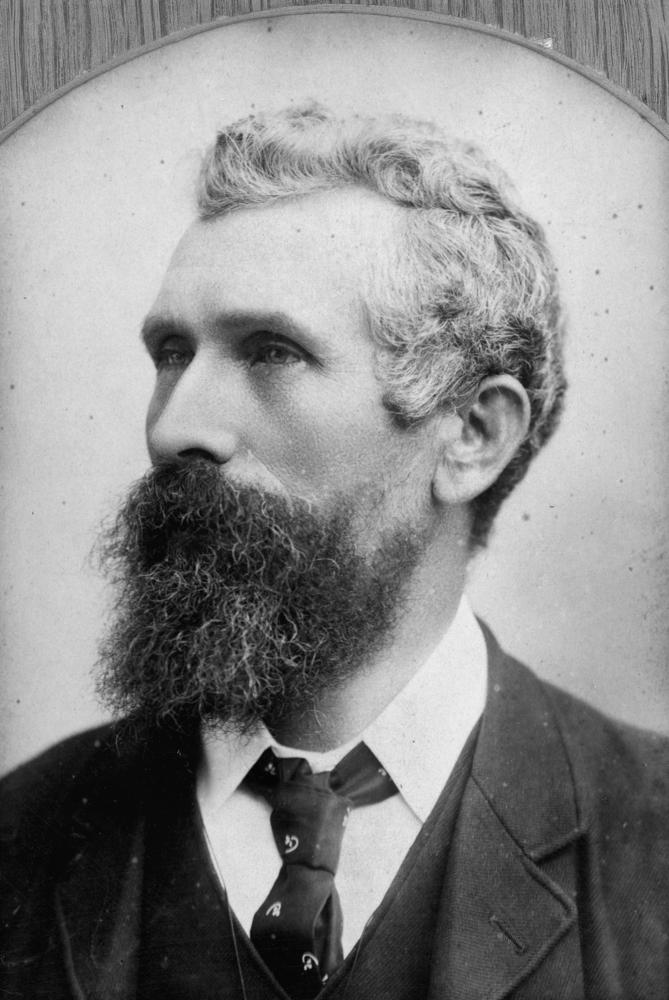
	First party	Second party
Leader	Thomas McIlwraith	Thomas Glassey
Party	Ministerialist	Labour
Leader's seat	Brisbane North	Bundaberg
Seats won	42	16
Popular vote	34,927	25,984
Percentage	44.78%	33.32%
Premier before election
Thomas McIlwraith
Ministerialist
Elected Premier
Thomas McIlwraith
Ministerialist

Elections were held in the Colony of Queensland between 18 April 1893 and 25 May 1893 to elect the members of the colony's Legislative Assembly.

This election was an early use of contingent voting in a government election, at least in the single-member districts.

Five districts were two-seat districts - Mackay, Marlborough, North Brisbane, Rockhampton and South Brisbane. In the two-member constituencies, plurality block voting was used -- electors could cast two valid votes but were allowed to "plump".

== Key dates ==
Due to problems of distance and communications, it was not possible to hold the elections on a single day.

== Results ==
↓
42	16	7	7
Ministerialists	Labour	Opposition	Independent

Queensland colonial election, 29 April 1893 Legislative Assembly << 1888–1896 >>
Enrolled voters	86,983				
Votes cast	77,993		Turnout	73.11	
Informal votes			Informal		
Summary of votes by party
Party	Primary votes	%	Swing	Seats	Change
Ministerialist	34,927	44.78		42	-
Labour	25,984	33.32		16	+12
Independent	7,905	10.14		7	+1
Opposition	7,154	9.17		7	-
Farmers Rep.	1,230	1.58		0	-
Total	77,993			72	

== See also ==
- Members of the Queensland Legislative Assembly, 1893–1896
