= 1899 Queensland colonial election =

- 1–25 March 1899

All 72 seats in the Legislative Assembly of Queensland 37 Assembly seats were needed for a majority
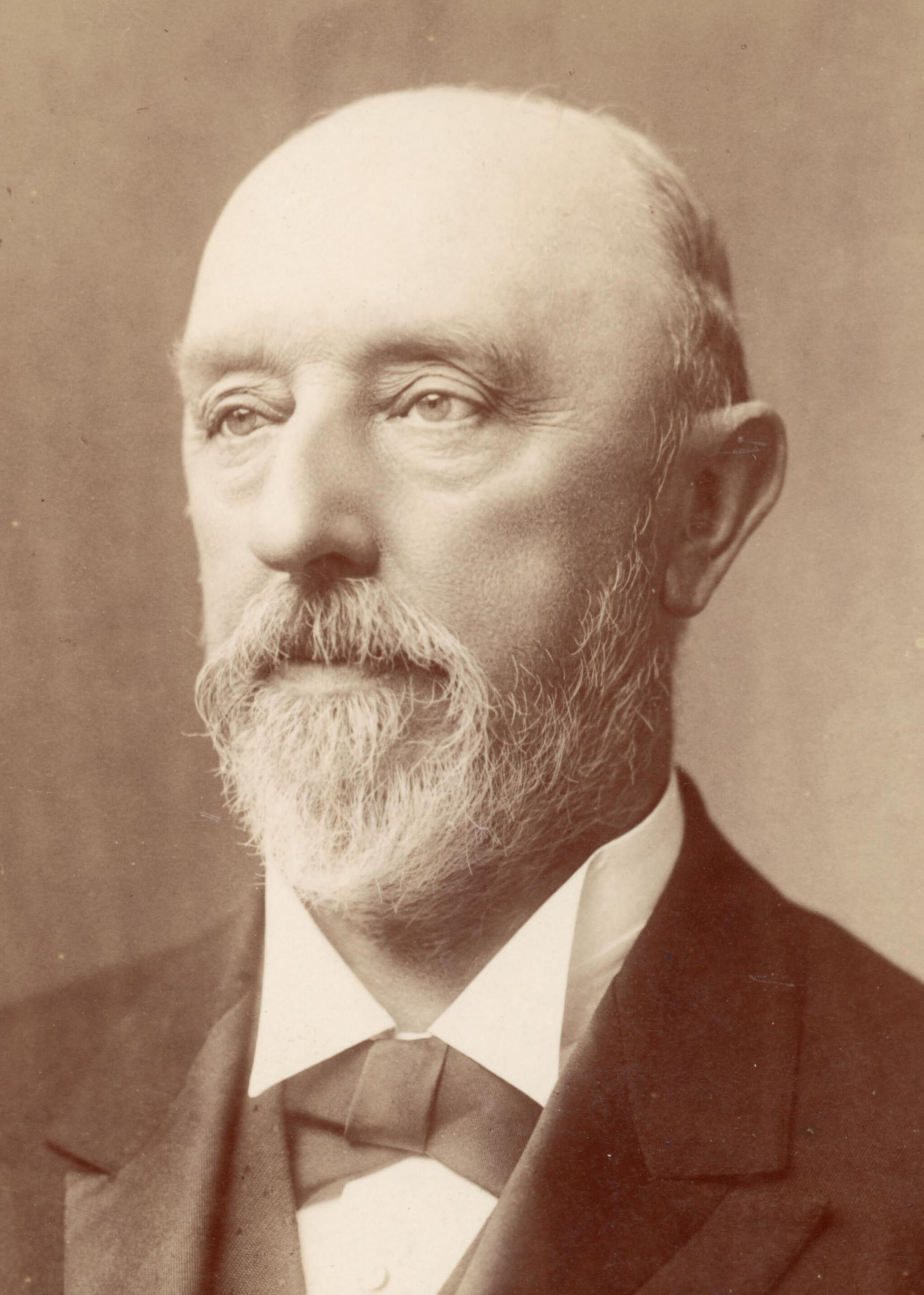

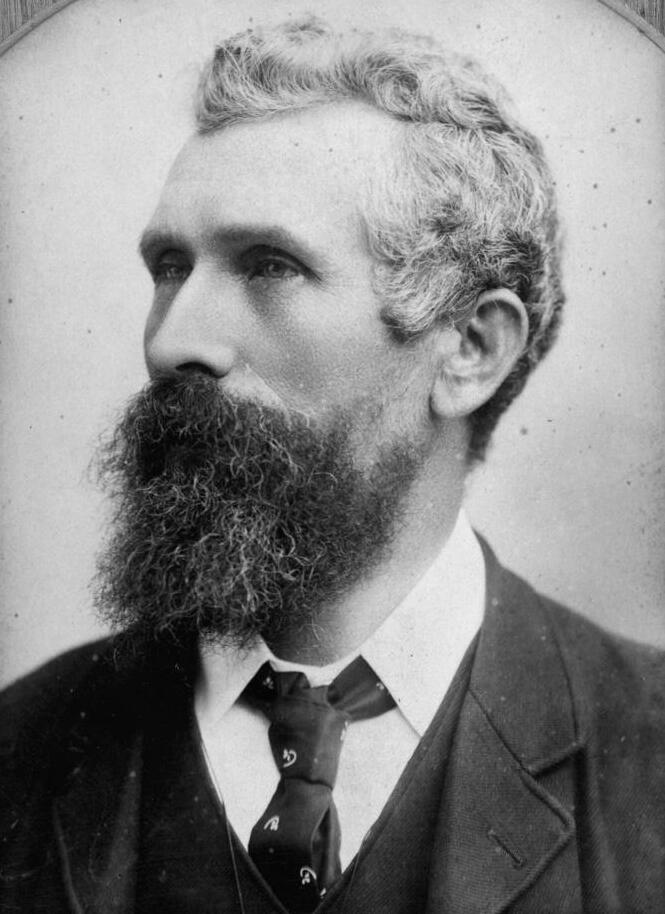
| | First party | Second party |
|---|---|---|
| Leader | James Dickson | Thomas Glassey |
| Party | Ministerial | Labour |
| Leader's seat | Bulimba | Bundaberg |
| Last election | 41 seats, 47.82% | 20 seats, 34.97% |
| Seats won | 43 | 21 |
| Seat change | ▲2 | ▲1 |
Premier before election
James Dickson
Ministerial (Queensland)
Elected Premier
James Dickson
Ministerial (Queensland)

Elections were held in the Colony of Queensland between 1 March 1899 and 25 March 1899 to elect the members of the colony's Legislative Assembly.

This election used contingent voting, at least in the single-member districts.

Five districts were two-seat districts - Mackay, Marlborough, North Brisbane, Rockhampton and South Brisbane. In the two-member constituencies, plurality block voting was used—electors could cast two valid votes but were allowed to "plump".

== Key dates ==
Due to problems of distance and communications, it was not possible to hold the elections on a single day.

== Results ==
Queensland colonial election, 11 March 1899 Legislative Assembly << 1896–1902 >>
| Enrolled voters | 97,046 | | | | |
| Votes cast | 74,919 | | Turnout | 79.13% | |
| Informal votes | 879 | | Informal | | |
Summary of votes by party
| Party | Primary votes | % | Swing | Seats | Change |
| Ministerialist | 46,953 | 49.34 | +1.52 | 43 | +2 |
| Labour | 33,756 | 35.47 | +0.51 | 21 | +1 |
| Opposition | 10,548 | 11.09 | +0.72 | 8 | ±0 |
| Independent | 3,898 | 4.10 | -0.32 | 0 | -2 |
| Total | 95,155 | | | 72 | |

== See also ==
- Members of the Queensland Legislative Assembly, 1899–1902
