= Electoral results for the district of Rockhampton =

Queensland, Australia, district election results

This is a list of electoral results for the electoral district of Rockhampton in Queensland state elections.

== Members for Rockhampton ==
First incarnation (1865–1878, 1 member)
Member	Term
Charles Fitzsimmons	1865–1867
Thomas Henry Fitzgerald	1867
Archibald Archer	1867–1869
Henry Milford^{[1]}	1869–1870
Alexander Fyfe	1870–1873
Charles Hardie Buzacott	1873–1877
John MacFarlane	1877–1878

^{1} Milford did not take his seat, resigned, and was defeated in the resulting by-election.

Second incarnation (1878–1912, 2 members)
Member	Party	Term	Member	Party	Term
William Rea		1878–1881	Thomas Macdonald-Paterson		1878–1883
John Ferguson	Griffith	1881–1888	William Higson	Griffith	1883–1888
Archibald Archer	Independent	1888–1896	William Pattison	Conservative	1888–1893
Archibald Archer	Independent	1888–1896	George Curtis	Independent	1893–1902
William Kidston	Labor	1896–1907	George Curtis	Independent	1893–1902
William Kidston	Labor	1896–1907	Kenneth Grant	Labor	1902–1907
William Kidston	Kidstonites	1907–1909	Kenneth Grant	Kidstonites	1907–1909
William Kidston	Liberal	1909–1911	Kenneth Grant	Liberal	1909–1912
John Adamson	Labor	1911–1912	Kenneth Grant	Liberal	1909–1912

Third incarnation (1912–1960, 1 member)
Member	Party	Term
John Adamson	Labor	1912–1916
John Adamson	Independent	1916–1917
Frank Forde	Labor	1917–1922
George Farrell	Labor	1923–1929
Thomas Dunlop	Independent	1929–1932
James Larcombe	Labor	1932–1956
Mick Gardner	Labor	1956–1957
Mick Gardner	Queensland Labor	1957–1960
Fourth incarnation (1972–present, 1 member)
Member	Party	Term
Keith Wright	Labor	1972–1985
Paul Braddy	Labor	1985–1995
Robert Schwarten	Labor	1995–2012
Bill Byrne	Labor	2012–2017
Barry O'Rourke	Labor	2017–2024
Donna Kirkland	Liberal National	2024–present

== Election results ==
=== Elections in the 2020s ===
2024 Queensland state election: Rockhampton
Party	Candidate	Votes	%	±%
Labor	Craig Marshall	9,774	30.20	−14.10
Liberal National	Donna Kirkland	9,243	28.55	+4.75
Independent	Margaret Strelow	5,780	17.86	+17.86
One Nation	David Bond	4,382	13.54	+1.14
Legalise Cannabis	Jacinta Waller	1,279	3.95	+0.05
Greens	Mick Jones	1,241	3.83	+0.43
Family First	Fredy Johnson	671	2.07	+2.07
Total formal votes		32,370	95.55	
Informal votes		1,506	4.45	
Turnout		33,876	87.01	
Two-party-preferred result
Liberal National	Donna Kirkland	16,772	51.81	+10.41
Labor	Craig Marshall	15,598	48.19	−10.41
Liberal National gain from Labor		Swing	+10.41	

2020 Queensland state election: Rockhampton
Party	Candidate	Votes	%	±%
Labor	Barry O'Rourke	13,289	44.32	+12.58
Liberal National	Tony Hopkins	7,118	23.74	+5.89
One Nation	Torin O'Brien	3,714	12.39	−9.00
Independent	Dominic Doblo	2,042	6.81	+6.81
Legalise Cannabis	Laura Barnard	1,189	3.97	+3.97
Katter's Australian	Christian Shepherd	1,151	3.84	+3.84
Greens	Mick Jones	1,025	3.42	−2.07
Informed Medical Options	Yvette Saxon	328	1.09	+1.09
United Australia	Paul Crangle	130	0.43	+0.43
Total formal votes		29,986	95.27	−0.45
Informal votes		1,489	4.73	+0.45
Turnout		31,475	86.18	−2.78
Two-party-preferred result
Labor	Barry O'Rourke	17,579	58.62	+0.60
Liberal National	Tony Hopkins	12,407	41.38	−0.60
Labor hold		Swing	+0.60	

=== Elections in the 2010s ===
2017 Queensland state election: Rockhampton
Party	Candidate	Votes	%	±%
Labor	Barry O'Rourke	9,675	31.7	−21.2
Independent	Margaret Strelow	7,174	23.5	+23.5
One Nation	Wade Rothery	6,521	21.4	+21.4
Liberal National	Douglas Rodgers	5,442	17.9	−12.4
Greens	Kate Giamarelos	1,674	5.5	−0.7
Total formal votes		30,486	95.7	−1.6
Informal votes		1,362	4.3	+1.6
Turnout		31,848	89.0	−1.3
Two-candidate-preferred result
Labor	Barry O'Rourke	16,825	55.2	−8.8
One Nation	Wade Rothery	13,661	44.8	+44.8
Labor hold		Swing	−8.8	

2015 Queensland state election: Rockhampton
Party	Candidate	Votes	%	±%
Labor	Bill Byrne	15,432	52.88	+13.09
Liberal National	Bridie Luva	8,869	30.39	−1.37
Greens	Michelle Taylor	1,863	6.38	+2.93
Family First	Sally-Anne Vincent	1,703	5.84	+3.18
Independent	Anne Margaret O'Connor	1,317	4.51	+3.48
Total formal votes		29,184	97.27	+0.26
Informal votes		818	2.73	−0.26
Turnout		30,002	91.76	+0.03
Two-party-preferred result
Labor	Bill Byrne	17,301	63.87	+9.92
Liberal National	Bridie Luva	9,787	36.13	−9.92
Labor hold		Swing	+9.92	

2012 Queensland state election: Rockhampton
Party	Candidate	Votes	%	±%
Labor	Bill Byrne	11,002	39.79	−21.78
Liberal National	Gavin Finch	8,781	31.76	+4.54
Katter's Australian	Shane Guley	3,507	12.68	+12.68
Independent	Bruce Diamond	1,847	6.68	+6.68
Greens	Bronwen Lloyd	954	3.45	−0.62
Family First	Genevieve Ellis	734	2.65	+2.65
Independent	Diane Hamilton	541	1.96	+1.96
Independent	Chris Hooper	286	1.03	+1.03
Total formal votes		27,652	97.02	−1.06
Informal votes		850	2.98	+1.06
Turnout		28,502	91.73	−0.11
Two-party-preferred result
Labor	Bill Byrne	12,191	53.95	−13.97
Liberal National	Gavin Finch	10,406	46.05	+13.97
Labor hold		Swing	−13.97	

=== Elections in the 2000s ===
2009 Queensland state election: Rockhampton
Party	Candidate	Votes	%	±%
Labor	Robert Schwarten	16,922	61.6	−7.4
Liberal National	Don Kane	7,482	27.2	−2.2
Independent	Gavin Finch	1,962	7.1	+7.1
Greens	Sam Clifford	1,118	4.1	+4.1
Total formal votes		27,484	98.0	
Informal votes		537	2.0	
Turnout		28,021	91.8	
Two-party-preferred result
Labor	Robert Schwarten	17,672	67.9	−1.9
Liberal National	Don Kane	8,348	32.1	+1.9
Labor hold		Swing	−1.9	

2006 Queensland state election: Rockhampton
Party	Candidate	Votes	%	±%
Labor	Robert Schwarten	15,581	70.5	+1.5
National	Robert Mills	6,512	29.5	−1.5
Total formal votes		22,093	97.6	+0.2
Informal votes		546	2.4	−0.2
Turnout		22,639	91.2	−1.6
Labor hold		Swing	+1.5	

2004 Queensland state election: Rockhampton
Party	Candidate	Votes	%	±%
Labor	Robert Schwarten	15,539	69.0	−0.1
National	Pamela Olive	6,997	31.0	+9.1
Total formal votes		22,536	97.4	−0.1
Informal votes		589	2.6	+0.1
Turnout		23,125	92.8	−0.6
Labor hold		Swing	−5.2	

2001 Queensland state election: Rockhampton
Party	Candidate	Votes	%	±%
Labor	Robert Schwarten	15,926	69.1	+20.5
National	Ron Bahnisch	5,053	21.9	+1.0
City Country Alliance	Peter Schuback	2,056	8.9	+8.9
Total formal votes		23,035	97.5	
Informal votes		592	2.5	
Turnout		23,627	93.4	
Two-party-preferred result
Labor	Robert Schwarten	16,166	74.2	+13.1
National	Ron Bahnisch	5,626	25.8	+25.8
Labor hold		Swing	+13.1	

=== Elections in the 1990s ===
1998 Queensland state election: Rockhampton
Party	Candidate	Votes	%	±%
Labor	Robert Schwarten	9,690	50.9	−1.0
One Nation	Len Timms	4,919	25.9	+25.9
National	Karen Mackay	3,677	19.3	−18.6
Democrats	Fay Lawrence	740	3.9	−0.6
Total formal votes		19,026	98.6	+0.4
Informal votes		267	1.4	−0.4
Turnout		19,293	94.1	+2.0
Two-candidate-preferred result
Labor	Robert Schwarten	10,853	59.6	+3.2
One Nation	Len Timms	7,355	40.4	+40.4
Labor hold		Swing	+3.2	

1995 Queensland state election: Rockhampton
Party	Candidate	Votes	%	±%
Labor	Robert Schwarten	10,143	51.9	−5.0
National	Sam Hassall	7,406	37.9	+11.2
Democrats	Chris Head	884	4.5	+4.5
Independent	Nev Thring	690	3.5	+3.5
Independent	Christopher Hooper	419	2.1	+2.1
Total formal votes		19,542	98.2	+0.8
Informal votes		360	1.8	−0.8
Turnout		19,902	92.1	
Two-party-preferred result
Labor	Robert Schwarten	10,704	56.4	−6.7
National	Sam Hassall	8,269	43.6	+6.7
Labor hold		Swing	−6.7	

1992 Queensland state election: Rockhampton
Party	Candidate	Votes	%	±%
Labor	Paul Braddy	11,866	56.9	−3.5
National	Ron Bahnisch	5,566	26.7	−5.2
Liberal	John Fillod	1,139	5.5	+0.5
Independent	Ross Allan	941	4.5	+4.5
Greens	Peter George	842	4.0	+4.0
Independent	Peter Boyle	511	2.5	+2.5
Total formal votes		20,865	97.3	
Informal votes		569	2.7	
Turnout		21,434	93.1	
Two-party-preferred result
Labor	Paul Braddy	12,485	63.1	+1.1
National	Ron Bahnisch	7,307	36.9	−1.1
Labor hold		Swing	+1.1	

=== Elections in the 1980s ===
1989 Queensland state election: Rockhampton
Party	Candidate	Votes	%	±%
Labor	Paul Braddy	10,022	63.8	+7.9
National	Barry Such	5,693	36.2	−3.2
Total formal votes		15,715	96.0	−2.2
Informal votes		649	4.0	+2.2
Turnout		16,364	93.1	−0.8
Labor hold		Swing	+5.6	

1986 Queensland state election: Rockhampton
Party	Candidate	Votes	%	±%
Labor	Paul Braddy	8,838	55.9	−1.3
National	Dennis Stevenson	6,234	39.4	+14.5
Independent	Carl Hatte	751	4.8	+4.8
Total formal votes		15,823	98.2	
Informal votes		292	1.8	
Turnout		16,115	93.9	
Two-party-preferred result
Labor	Paul Braddy	9,209	58.2	−2.9
National	Dennis Stevenson	6,614	41.8	+2.9
Labor hold		Swing	−2.9	

Rockhampton state by-election, 1985
Party	Candidate	Votes	%	±%
Labor	Paul Braddy	8,409	58.98	+1.77
National	Col Webber	5,849	41.02	–0.92
Total formal votes		14,258	97.87	–1.13
Informal votes		310	2.13	+1.13
Turnout		14,568	87.77	–5.24
Labor hold		Swing	+1.77	

1983 Queensland state election: Rockhampton
Party	Candidate	Votes	%	±%
Labor	Keith Wright	8,936	57.2	−7.3
National	Charles Doblo	3,892	24.9	−0.4
Liberal	Alan Agnew	2,660	17.0	+6.8
Independent	Brian Dillon	131	0.8	+0.8
Total formal votes		15,619	99.0	−0.1
Informal votes		157	1.0	+0.1
Turnout		15,776	93.0	+2.7
Two-party-preferred result
Labor	Keith Wright	9,596	61.4	−5.9
National	Charles Doblo	6,023	38.6	+5.9
Labor hold		Swing	−5.9	

1980 Queensland state election: Rockhampton
Party	Candidate	Votes	%	±%
Labor	Keith Wright	10,125	64.5	−0.1
National	Garnet Lincoln	3,965	25.3	+10.6
Liberal	Douglas Cuddy	1,603	10.2	−8.3
Total formal votes		15,693	99.1	+0.2
Informal votes		142	0.9	−0.2
Turnout		15,835	90.3	−2.9
Two-party-preferred result
Labor	Keith Wright	10,566	67.3	0.0
National	Garnet Lincoln	5,127	32.7	+32.7
Labor hold		Swing	0.0	

=== Elections in the 1970s ===
1977 Queensland state election: Rockhampton
Party	Candidate	Votes	%	±%
Labor	Keith Wright	10,342	64.6	
Liberal	Douglas Cuddy	2,961	18.5	
National	Charles Doblo	2,356	14.7	
Progress	Graham James	343	2.1	
Total formal votes		16,002	98.9	
Informal votes		180	93.2	
Turnout		16,182	93.2	
Two-party-preferred result
Labor	Keith Wright	10,775	67.3	+8.9
Liberal	Douglas Cuddy	5,227	32.7	−8.9
Labor hold		Swing	+8.9	

1974 Queensland state election: Rockhampton
Party	Candidate	Votes	%	±%
Labor	Keith Wright	6,347	50.9	−2.3
Liberal	Alan Agnew	3,814	30.6	+4.0
National	Michael Bleines	1,915	15.4	+0.8
Queensland Labor	Robert Bom	385	3.1	−2.4
Total formal votes		12,461	99.3	+0.3
Informal votes		88	0.7	−0.3
Turnout		12,549	93.0	−1.5
Two-party-preferred result
Labor	Keith Wright	6,680	53.6	−2.3
Liberal	Alan Agnew	5,781	46.4	+2.3
Labor hold		Swing	−2.3	

1972 Queensland state election: Rockhampton
Party	Candidate	Votes	%	±%
Labor	Keith Wright	6,319	53.2	+2.3
Liberal	Rex Pilbeam	3,163	26.6	−14.2
Country	Terence Molloy	1,741	14.6	+14.6
Queensland Labor	Robert Bom	658	5.5	−2.8
Total formal votes		11,881	99.0	
Informal votes		125	1.0	
Turnout		12,006	94.5	
Two-party-preferred result
Labor	Keith Wright	6,643	55.9	+3.7
Liberal	Rex Pilbeam	5,238	44.1	−3.7
Labor hold		Swing	+3.7	

=== Elections in the 1950s ===
1957 Queensland state election: Rockhampton
Party	Candidate	Votes	%	±%
Queensland Labor	Mick Gardner	3,245	36.3	+36.3
Liberal	James Marshall	2,589	29.0	−20.3
Labor	James Fraser	2,203	24.6	−25.4
Independent	Rex Pilbeam	895	10.0	+10.0
Independent	Thomas Kelly	9	0.1	+0.1
Total formal votes		8,941	99.4	+0.4
Informal votes		51	0.6	−0.4
Turnout		8,992	95.7	+0.2
Queensland Labor gain from Labor		Swing	N/A	

1956 Queensland state election: Rockhampton
Party	Candidate	Votes	%	±%
Labor	Mick Gardner	4,445	50.0	−11.8
Liberal	Rex Pilbeam	4,379	49.3	+13.7
Independent	Tom Kelly	66	0.7	−1.9
Total formal votes		8,890	99.0	0.0
Informal votes		86	1.0	0.0
Turnout		8,976	95.5	+0.4
Labor hold		Swing	−12.7	

1953 Queensland state election: Rockhampton
Party	Candidate	Votes	%	±%
Labor	James Larcombe	5,457	61.8	+10.5
Liberal	Thomas Donohoe	3,141	35.6	−13.0
Independent	Thomas Kelly	227	2.6	+2.6
Total formal votes		8,825	99.0	0.0
Informal votes		88	1.0	0.0
Turnout		8,913	95.1	+2.2
Labor hold		Swing	+12.2	

1950 Queensland state election: Rockhampton
Party	Candidate	Votes	%	±%
Labor	James Larcombe	4,709	51.3	
Liberal	Ron Diamond	4,464	48.7	
Total formal votes		9,173	99.0	
Informal votes		90	1.0	
Turnout		9,263	92.9	
Labor hold		Swing		

=== Elections in the 1940s ===
1947 Queensland state election: Rockhampton
Party	Candidate	Votes	%	±%
Labor	James Larcombe	5,312	50.4	−15.1
People's Party	Arthur Gordon	2,981	28.3	+28.3
Independent	Edwin Price	1,193	11.3	+11.3
Frank Barnes Labor	Arthur Webb	1,060	10.0	+10.0
Total formal votes		10,546	99.3	+1.7
Informal votes		74	0.7	−1.7
Turnout		10,620	92.9	+6.4
Labor hold		Swing	−1.4	

1944 Queensland state election: Rockhampton
Party	Candidate	Votes	%	±%
Labor	James Larcombe	6,361	65.5	−7.4
Country	Jack O'Shanesey	3,345	34.5	+34.5
Total formal votes		9,706	97.6	+1.7
Informal votes		236	2.4	−1.7
Turnout		9,942	86.5	−1.9
Labor hold		Swing	N/A	

1941 Queensland state election: Rockhampton
Party	Candidate	Votes	%	±%
Labor	James Larcombe	6,920	72.9	+12.0
Communist	Robert Nicholls	2,575	27.1	+27.1
Total formal votes		9,495	95.9	−3.3
Informal votes		401	4.1	+3.3
Turnout		9,896	88.4	−3.4
Labor hold		Swing	N/A	

=== Elections in the 1930s ===
1938 Queensland state election: Rockhampton
Party	Candidate	Votes	%	±%
Labor	James Larcombe	5,939	60.9	−11.5
Country	Thomas Parris	2,732	28.0	+28.0
Social Credit	Vivian Pugh	1,086	11.1	−16.5
Total formal votes		9,757	99.2	+1.0
Informal votes		80	0.8	−1.0
Turnout		9,837	91.8	−0.3
Labor hold		Swing	N/A	

- Preferences were not distributed.

1935 Queensland state election: Rockhampton
Party	Candidate	Votes	%	±%
Labor	James Larcombe	6,517	72.4	
Social Credit	Vivian Pugh	2,481	27.6	
Total formal votes		8,998	98.2	
Informal votes		169	1.8	
Turnout		9,167	92.1	
Labor hold		Swing		

1932 Queensland state election: Rockhampton
Party	Candidate	Votes	%	±%
Labor	James Larcombe	5,331	60.7	
Independent	Thomas Dunlop	2,346	26.7	
Independent	Joseph Conachan	1,101	12.5	
Total formal votes		8,778	99.0	
Informal votes		92	1.0	
Turnout		8,870	93.2	
Labor gain from Independent		Swing		

- Preferences were not distributed.

=== Elections in the 1920s ===
1929 Queensland state election: Rockhampton
Party	Candidate	Votes	%	±%
Independent	Thomas Dunlop	2,993	61.7	+61.7
Labor	George Farrell	1,855	38.3	−29.4
Total formal votes		4,848	98.7	+0.9
Informal votes		62	1.3	−0.9
Turnout		4,910	92.0	+4.0
Independent gain from Labor		Swing	N/A	

1926 Queensland state election: Rockhampton
Party	Candidate	Votes	%	±%
Labor	George Farrell	3,088	67.7	+6.3
CPNP	James Cullen	1,473	32.3	−6.3
Total formal votes		4,561	97.8	−0.6
Informal votes		101	2.2	+0.6
Turnout		4,662	88.2	+11.9
Labor hold		Swing	+6.3	

1923 Queensland state election: Rockhampton
Party	Candidate	Votes	%	±%
Labor	George Farrell	2,705	61.4	−4.2
United	Thomas Lanigan	1,699	38.6	+4.2
Total formal votes		4,404	98.4	−0.6
Informal votes		72	1.6	+0.6
Turnout		4,476	76.3	−0.1
Labor hold		Swing	−4.2	

1920 Queensland state election: Rockhampton
Party	Candidate	Votes	%	±%
Labor	Frank Forde	2,997	65.6	−2.7
National	Theodore Kingel	1,572	34.4	+2.7
Total formal votes		4,569	99.0	+0.8
Informal votes		45	1.0	−0.8
Turnout		4,614	76.4	+0.4
Labor hold		Swing	−2.7	

=== Elections in the 1910s ===
1918 Queensland state election: Rockhampton
Party	Candidate	Votes	%	±%
Labor	Frank Forde	3,033	68.3	+2.2
National	John Egerton	1,407	31.7	−2.2
Total formal votes		4,440	98.2	−0.1
Informal votes		79	1.8	+0.1
Turnout		4,519	76.0	−10.4
Labor hold		Swing	+2.2	

1915 Queensland state election: Rockhampton
Party	Candidate	Votes	%	±%
Labor	John Adamson	2,576	66.1	+10.6
Liberal	Thomas Renshaw	1,321	33.9	−10.6
Total formal votes		2,997	98.3	−0.8
Informal votes		68	1.7	+0.8
Turnout		3,065	86.4	+19.4
Labor hold		Swing	+10.6	

1912 Queensland state election: Rockhampton
Party	Candidate	Votes	%	±%
Labor	John Adamson	1,705	55.5	
Liberal	George Curtis	1,366	44.5	
Total formal votes		3,071	99.1	
Informal votes		27	0.9	
Turnout		3,098	67.0	
Labor hold		Swing		

=== Elections in the 1860s ===
==== Queensland general election, held on 27 June 1867 ====
The result in Rockhampton in the general election held on 27 June 1867 were:

Candidate	Votes	Result
Thomas Henry FitzGerald	197	elected
Archibald Archer	187	
John Bright	17	
