= Wade Rothery =

Australian rugby league footballer

Cr Wade Rothery

Councillor of the Livingstone Shire
- Incumbent
- Assumed office 16 March 2024

Personal details
- Born: 7 June 1977 (age 49) Rockhampton, Queensland, Australia
- Rugby league career

Playing information
- Position: Wing
Club
Years	Team	Pld	T	G	FG	P
1999	Balmain Tigers	7	2	0	0	8

Wade Anthony Rothery (born 7 June 1977) is an Australian former professional rugby league footballer and local government councillor.

At the 2024 Queensland local elections, Rothery was elected a councillor on the Yeppoon-based Livingstone Shire Council.

== Rugby league ==
Rothery is best known for brief stint competing in the National Rugby League, where he played with the Balmain Tigers during the 1999 NRL season. Prior to this, Rothery played for the Brisbane Broncos reserve side in the 1997 Super League competition.

Rothery's time playing for the Balmain Tigers came to an end when he sustained a knee injury. From 2000 onwards, he played for the Central Comets in the Queensland Cup competition.

Rothery announced his retirement in 2005 following a 52–10 loss to Easts Tigers. However, he relocated to the Sunshine Coast the following year when he was recruited by local club Caloundra Sharks in 2006. In 2007, Rothery made the move over to another local Sunshine Coast club, the Beerwah Hinterland Bulldogs.

== Politics ==
=== 2017 Queensland state election ===
In October 2017, it was announced that Rothery had been selected as the One Nation candidate for the seat of Rockhampton to contest the 2017 Queensland state election. The announcement ended several days of speculation in the local media during which several Central Queensland rugby league identities were named as possibly being the mystery former professional rugby league footballer until One Nation leader Pauline Hanson confirmed the endorsed candidate. The speculated candidates included Guy Williams, Scott Minto and PJ Marsh.

Rothery placed second, beating out Rockhampton mayor Margaret Strelow and the LNP's Douglas Rodgers. Despite a strong flow of preferences going towards Rothery who drew 44.81% of the two-candidate preferred vote, the ALP's Barry O'Rourke was the ultimate winner with 55.19%.

=== 2019 Australian federal election ===
Rothery stood as the One Nation candidate for the electorate of Capricornia at the 2019 Australian federal election.

He attained 16.98% of the primary vote, placing third behind winner Michelle Landry of the Coalition and ALP candidate Russell Robertson.

=== 2020 Queensland state election ===
Rothery again won preselection as a One Nation candidate, but this time to represent Keppel in the 2020 Queensland state election after relocating from Rockhampton to Yeppoon.

Achieving 15.65% of the first preference vote, Rothery placed third behind incumbent Labor MP Brittany Lauga and LNP candidate Adrian De Groot.

=== 2024 Queensland local elections ===
At the 2024 Queensland local elections, Rothery was elected as a councillor on the Yeppoon-based Livingstone Shire Council. He was declared as the sixth candidate to be elected to Livingstone after a recount, winning by just two first preference votes narrowly beating CQ Today journalist Trish Bowman.

== Personal life ==
Rothery spent twelve years working in the coal mining industry. He was part of the Queensland Mines Rescue Service team that won the state championships in 2016 and 2018.

In 2020, Rothery launched a $1.6 million civil lawsuit against Anglo American and labour hire firm One Key Resources alleging he was injured in two separate workplace accidents at Grosvenor Mine near Moranbah. According to Rothery, he sustaining a crushing injury in 2017 which resulted in requiring party of his thumb to be amputated. Rothery also alleged he was involved in another workplace incident in 2019, in which he sustained serious spinal injuries and shoulder damage. Rothery has said that since his injuries, he has campaigned for better mine safety.

In May 2020, Rothery was questioned by police who had received a complaint accusing him of travelling to Brisbane in breach of strict COVID-19 pandemic lockdown requirements. The complaint was dismissed when it was discovered Rothery was required to attend a neurosurgeon appointment related to his mining injuries.

Wade Rothery is a brother of fellow rugby league player Alan Rothery.
