= Graham McCamley =

Australian cattle baron (1932–2026)

Sir Graham McCamley MBE
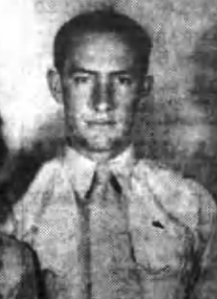
- McCamley aged 21
- Born: 24 August 1932
- Died: 3 January 2026 (aged 93); Yeppoon, Queensland, Australia
- Occupation: Beef producer
- Children: 3

Sir Graham Edward McCamley (24 August 1932 – 3 January 2026) was an Australian cattle baron.

McCamley was best known for establishing a cattle empire in Queensland where he bred premium Brahman stud herds. He was one of the first cattle producers in Australia to develop and promote the breed.

== Early life ==
McCamley's parents Edward and Ivy were second-generation Polled Hereford cattle breeders. They had established a successful stud on their property Eulogie Park near Dululu, Queensland. McCamley was born in 1932 and grew up on the Dululu property with his siblings and learnt as much as he could about cattle.

In 1947, McCamley fell from his horse while chasing after a bullock. He suffered injuries to his right leg after his horse landed on it in the fall. He was treated by ambulance officers from Wowan, Queensland, before being taken to Rockhampton. McCamley was then flown to Brisbane for further treatment.

As he became older, McCamley continued to show an interest in the quality of various cattle breeds. In 1948, he entered the Queensland Country Life Young Judges Competition at the Rockhampton Show, where he placed first after impressing the judge with his eye for detail on the points bulls needed to be considered high quality.

== Cattle industry ==
In 1954, McCamley travelled to the United States with his sister Mavis and Queensland cattle grazier Clare Langmore. They spent three months touring the country inspecting the quality of American cattle breeds. They visited the University of California and ranches in Kansas and Wyoming. Upon their return, they were keen to relay their experiences and impressions about American cattle.

Soon after marrying his wife, McCamley purchased "Tartrus" which was the start of the McCamley cattle empire.

McCamley eventually established Brahman herds on Tartrus Station situated west of Marlborough, Queensland, namely the Tartrus Red and Grey Brahman breeds. However, he claimed it was only because he was tired of mustering Poll Herefords to treat for ticks that he decided to move into breeding Brahman cattle in 1958, although it was originally because he wanted to see what negative qualities Brahman cattle had. After beginning to receive quality returns for the Brahman breed, McCamley worked closely with the CSIRO to monitor the breeds for weight gain and fertility performance. The stud at Tartrus would go on to become recognised by CSIRO scientists for producing "super dams" – cows that would calve annually. McCamley eventually built up a considerable cattle empire in Central Queensland, encompassing the properties of Tartrus, Royles, Glenprairie, Oakleigh, Stoodleigh and Tanderra.

McCamley was the first president of the Cattlemen's Union of Australia which was established in May 1975. Following the union's first national convention, held in Rockhampton, McCamley said the union had established itself as a force to be reckoned with when it came to representing the beef industry, despite critics forecasting a short life for the union. The three-day conference attracted more than 3,000 members and observers from Queensland, New South Wales, Victoria and the Northern Territory.

In 1977, McCamley responded angrily at blackmail allegations made by National Country Party MP David Thomson who claimed executives from the Cattleman's Union had threatened him with voting for Australian Democrats candidates at the next Federal Election.

McCamley led the Cattleman's Union of Australia until 1978.

== Bjelke-Petersen search ==
In 1985, McCamley was credited with playing a pivotal role in saving the life of John Bjelke-Petersen, the son of Queensland premier Joh Bjelke-Petersen and future Queensland leader of the Country Party.

On 4 September 1985, Bjelke-Petersen was working on his property, "Ten Mile", on the Mackenzie River north of Duaringa, Queensland. While rounding up some stray cattle, he came off his motorbike and fell down a 15-metre embankment with the motorbike landing on top of him. With Bjelke-Petersen missing for hours, a large-scale search was organised.

Bjelke-Petersen had recently received a death threat, giving police some reason to believe he may have been kidnapped or met with foul play.

Police contacted McCamley the night Bjelke-Petersen went missing to ask for assistance. McCamley immediately fuelled his private helicopter and left his property "Tartrus" at first light the following morning. In 2015, McCamley recalled how he had spotted skid marks while he was flying his helicopter along a boundary fence, before locating Bjelke-Petersen's motorbike. Landing his helicopter, McCamley contacted the police to direct them to the scene. But despite locating the motorbike and some personal effects, Bjelke-Petersen was not found. McCamley then got back into his helicopter to continue searching.

After a short time in the air, McCamley eventually located Bjelke-Petersen slumped over a log, slipping in and out of consciousness and again alerted the police to his location. Bjelke-Petersen had somehow walked to some cattle yards, despite being seriously injured. In the accident, Bjelke-Petersen sustained a punctured lung, broken elbow, and broken ribs. He spent several weeks in the intensive care unit at the Rockhampton Base Hospital.

== Aviation accidents ==
Flying is a popular way of travelling around large cattle stations in Australia. The McCamley cattle empire was no exception. However, there have been a number of accidents involving aircraft on "Tartrus", the McCamley's cattle property north-west of Rockhampton.

=== 1997 ultralight plane crash ===
On 2 May 1997, McCamley's daughter Jennifer and another person suffered injuries when an ultralight plane crashed shortly after take-off from an airstrip at "Tartrus".

=== 1997 rescue helicopter fire ===
On 2 May 1997, the Rockhampton-based Capricorn Helicopter Rescue Service was dispatched to "Tartus" to assist in the evacuation of the two injured persons who were injured in the ultralight plane crash.

Ten minutes after the rescue helicopter landed at "Tartrus", the pilot turned on a valve on the medical oxygen cylinder which was fitted inside the helicopter's cargo department. The opening of the valve triggered a loud explosion and the pilot was violently thrown out of the helicopter. He suffered blast damage to his left lung, internal bruising and a burst eardrum. The explosion triggered a fire which completely destroyed the rescue helicopter.

=== 2007 helicopter crash ===
On 3 October 2007, the private helicopter McCamley was piloting hit some tree branches and crashed at "Tartrus".

Upon hitting the ground, the helicopter burst into flames. Two men who happened to be nearby, Tom Koch-Emmery and Luke Walters, rushed to the crashed helicopter and dragged the badly injured McCamley out just before it exploded. Walters stayed with McCamley while Koch-Emmery rode the four kilometres to the Tartrus homestead to raise the alarm.

The Capricorn Helicopter Rescue Service was dispatched to "Tartrus" and airlifted McCamley back to Rockhampton. McCamley was then airlifted to Brisbane, suffering from a suspected fractured spine and other internal injuries.

In 2015, Koch-Emmery received the Bravery Medal while Walters received the Commendation for Brave Conduct for the assistance they provided McCamley at the time of the accident.

=== 2010 ultralight plane crash ===
On 4 April 2010, McCamley's wife Lady Shirley McCamley was killed in an ultralight plane crash at "Tartrus". The 19-year-old pilot was the McCamley's grandson Max, who survived the crash but suffered back injuries. Lady Shirley McCamley's funeral was held at St Paul's Cathedral in Rockhampton where 1200 mourners gathered to pay their respects.

== Livingstone Hills proposal ==
In June 2011, McCamley put forward a vision to build 3,000 residential sites on the Capricorn Coast between Causeway Lake and Lammermoor. According to McCamley, the new development would have been called "Livingstone Hills" and would have been an ideal spot for Fly-in fly-out mine workers to live, particularly with the inclusion of an airstrip in the development. The Livingstone Hills plan would have also included a conference centre, resort and hotel.

== Retirement ==
In 2012, McCamley indicated that he was planning to retire to Yeppoon, Queensland after 65 years in the beef industry.

He said he had decided to sell one of his cattle stations, "Glenprairie" in three separate title as it wasn't viable to keep the property in the family due to his grandsons being interested in other careers away from the beef industry. McCamley also said at the time that he'd been battling cancer but was now in good health.

However, in December 2013, McCamley said he was still living in a campervan on "Tanderra", one of his former properties that had been sold at auction in June 2013. He said although it was the smallest of all his former properties, he was very happy living in the campervan, still using his desk and part of the new owner's house.

Despite being retired, McCamley continued to show an interest in the agricultural sector, particularly in Central Queensland. In August 2014, he publicly supported a proposal put forward by Rockhampton businessman Dominic Doblo to build a 10,000GL dam at The Gap on the Fitzroy River. McCamley said he no longer had any personal interest in wanting the dam to be constructed, but considered it to be critical for the growth of Rockhampton, the Capricorn Coast and Gladstone.

In 2018, McCamley published his memoir entitled Roads in the Sky. The first copy of the book was framed, signed and auctioned with local businesswoman Karla McPhail being the successful bidder who purchased the book for $8000. McCamley also donated four copies of the book to Rockhampton Regional Council's local libraries in 2019 for resident to borrow. Local newspaper CQ Today published 37 excerpts from the book throughout 2021.

== Property sales ==
McCamley decided to sell his organic 46,000 hectare "Glenprairie" property but was passed in at auction for a second time in May 2012, attracting just one bid of $55 million which was well below the asking price of nearly $80 million. McCamley had purchased the property in 2005 for $106 million and claimed it was the biggest property deal his bank had processed.

In May 2013, it was reported that McCamley was preparing to sell the family property of "Tartrus" along with "Royles Lot 2", "Glenprairie", "Oakleigh", "Stoodleigh" and "Tanderra" at an auction in Rockhampton on 5 June 2013. McCamley's granddaughter was expected to take over McCamley's son's property "Royles". McCamley had spent 59 years on "Tartrus". However, McCamley managed to sell "Tartrus" and "Royles Lot 2" a week before they were due to go to auction. The "Glenprairie" aggregation still went to auction at the Rockhampton Leagues Club as planned. McCamley's organic cattle were sold in a clearing sale on 22 June 2013.

McCamley's "Glenprairie" station sold for $28 million. It was reported that McCamley was driven off the land due to falling land prices and the poor cattle market, and the stalled plan to develop the $600 million "Livingstone Hills" residential development on the Capricorn Coast. McCamley also failed to appear on the annual Sunday Mail Queensland's Top 150 Rich List in 2013 despite his family's assets being worth an estimated $181million the previous year.

McCamley decided to offload the "Oakleigh" and "Stoodleigh" properties, part of the larger "Glenprairie" aggregation, in December 2013. The two properties were subdivided into about 15 large and eight smaller paddocks. Since purchasing the properties in 2005, McCamley had made improvements to the property worth $3million, including building water infrastructure, and installing new cattle yards and fencing. "Oakleigh" and "Stoodleigh" were eventually bought by Canadian pension fund, the Public Sector Pension Investment Board. In what was believed to be its first rural land purchase in Australia, the price the board paid for the property was believed to be in the vicinity of $13million. One newspaper article pointed out the apparent double standards between that particular deal, which didn't provoke any "murmur of dissent" and the attempted Chinese buyout of S. Kidman & Co properties, which prompted much public discussion about foreign ownership which pressured Australian treasurer Scott Morrison to block the sale twice.

On 4 December 2013, 520 registered Red and Grey Brahman cattle from McCamley's former Tartrus Brahman stud were dispersed at auction at the Central Queensland Livestock Exchange at Gracemere near Rockhampton. The sale was conducted under the instructions from the receivers of Jennifer McCamley Pty Ltd following the business going into receivership. McCamley had originally passed on the Tartrus stud to his daughter a number of years prior.

== Personal life ==
=== Family ===
McCamley married Shirley Tindale on 6 October 1956 at St Paul's Cathedral in Rockhampton.

They had three children and seven grandchildren.

McCamley's grandson, Remy McCamley, was one of the record 17 candidates who contested the infamous 2021 Rockhampton Region mayoral election following the sudden resignation of Margaret Strelow.

=== Death ===
McCamley died in Yeppoon, Queensland on 3 January 2026, at the age of 93.

A funeral for McCamley was held at St Paul's Cathedral in Rockhampton on 12 January 2026.

== Honours ==
In 1981, McCamley was appointed a Member of the Order of the British Empire (MBE) in the Queen's Birthday honours list, for his contribution to the beef industry.

In 1986, McCamley was knighted for his contributions to the beef industry. McCamley said he did not expect to be called by the title Sir Graham. He said that if his three-year-old grandson could simply call him "Graham", everybody else should as well.

Despite being a knight, McCamley publicly opposed the decision by Australian prime minister Tony Abbott to reintroduce the titles of knights and dames in 2014, describing the move as unnecessary. He said that once the decision was made to move to an Australian honours system, the decision should have been final instead of the country wavering between the two honours systems. He also said that while Australians who have done good things for the country should be recognised, the Australian system had been running too long for it to be changed.

McCamley's comments drew support from former Member for Rockhampton Robert Schwarten.
