= Chris Hooper =

Chris Hooper may refer to:

- Chris Hooper (musician), Canadian musician with the Grapes of Wrath
- Chris Hooper (basketball) (born 1991), American basketball player
- Chris "Pineapple" Hooper, mayoral candidate in Rockhampton Region, Queensland, Australia
