= Rockhampton Grammar School =

The Rockhampton Grammar School

Location
- Rockhampton, Queensland; Australia
- Coordinates: 23°23′04.85″S 150°29′37.93″E

Information
- Type: Independent, day & boarding
- Motto: Latin: Macte Virtute Et Litteris (Grow in character and scholarship)
- Established: 1881
- Head teacher: Dr Phillip Moulds
- Years: EL–12
- Gender: Co-educational
- Enrollment: ~1350
- Campus: Rockhampton
- Colors: Red, white & black
- Website: www.rgs.qld.edu.au

The Rockhampton Grammar School is an independent, co-educational, non-denominational, day and boarding school located in The Range, Rockhampton, Queensland, Australia catering to students from Early Learning through to Year 12.

== History ==
Some of the school's buildings were listed on the Queensland Heritage Register in 1992.

== Notable alumni ==
- Alexander Belonogoff, Olympic rower
- Tara Cheyne, politician
- Ben Condon, professional rugby league player
- Theo Fourie, professional rugby union player
- George Creed, politician
- David Daniel, politician
- Sir Robin Edward Dysart Grey, banker and 6th Baronet Grey of Fallodon.
- Harold Hartley, politician
- Nev Hewitt, politician
- Beatrice Hutton, architect
- Gary Larson, Australian representative rugby league player
- Brittany Lauga, politician
- J.S.S. Martin, Scottish military doctor in both World Wars
- Ken O'Dowd, politician
- Stuart Robert, politician and former Minister for Human Services
- Alex Russell, film actor

== Notable staff ==
- Ernest Anthoney
- Henry Kellow
- Islay Lee
- T. J. Ryan
- Cameron Venables

== See also ==
- List of schools in Queensland
- List of boarding schools
