= Rockhampton Grammar School Buildings =

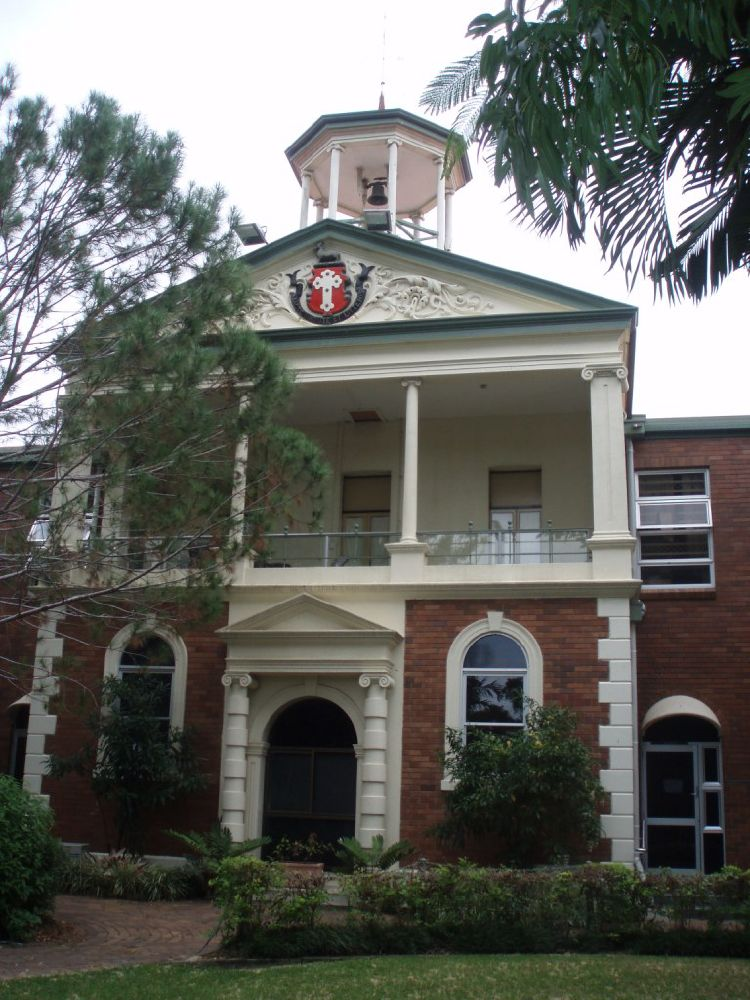
- Administration block, 2009

- Location within Queensland
- 23.3845°S 150.4941°E
- Location: Archer Street, The Range, Rockhampton, Rockhampton Region, Queensland, Australia

History
- Design period: 1870s - 1890s (late 19th century)
- Built: 1880 - 1951

Site notes
- Architectural style: Classicism

Queensland Heritage Register
- Official name: Rockhampton Grammar School
- Type: state heritage (built)
- Designated: 21 October 1992
- Reference no.: 600781
- Significant period: 1880s-1900s (historical); 1880s-1890s (fabric); 1880s ongoing (social)
- Significant components: memorial/monument, school/school room

Rockhampton Grammar School Buildings are a heritage-listed group of private school buildings at Archer Street, The Range, Rockhampton, Rockhampton Region, Queensland, Australia. They were built from 1880 to 1951. It was added to the Queensland Heritage Register on 21 October 1992.

== History ==
The Rockhampton Grammar School was opened in 1881. The main building, a two storeyed brick building, now known as the Administration Building, was erected in 1880 to the design of Rockhampton architect, Sidney Williams.

The Rockhampton Grammar School was the state's fourth grammar school. The grammar schools, as private schools partially funded by the government, formed an important part in the colony's fledgling secondary education system. During the 1870s a grammar school for the town was mooted and a parcel of land adjoining the town hall was reserved for such a purpose. However it was not until 1878, that the first trustees were appointed under the Grammar School Act and a site for the new school chosen on the Athelstane Range.

In the following year, Sidney Williams won an architectural competition for the design and the tender of £4,580 by prominent builder and politician, John Ferguson was accepted. This was later increased to £6,026 after the Colonial Architect FDG Stanley recommended some alterations including the deepening of the foundations and the addition of another verandah. The contract did not include furniture or any preparation of the grounds. Not until 1900 was the school's first oval completed.

The school building, which overlooked the town centre included accommodation for the headmaster, male boarders, and classrooms. Contemporary reports described it as a prominent object in the landscape; its picturesque and airy site was considered appropriate for the education of young men and women.

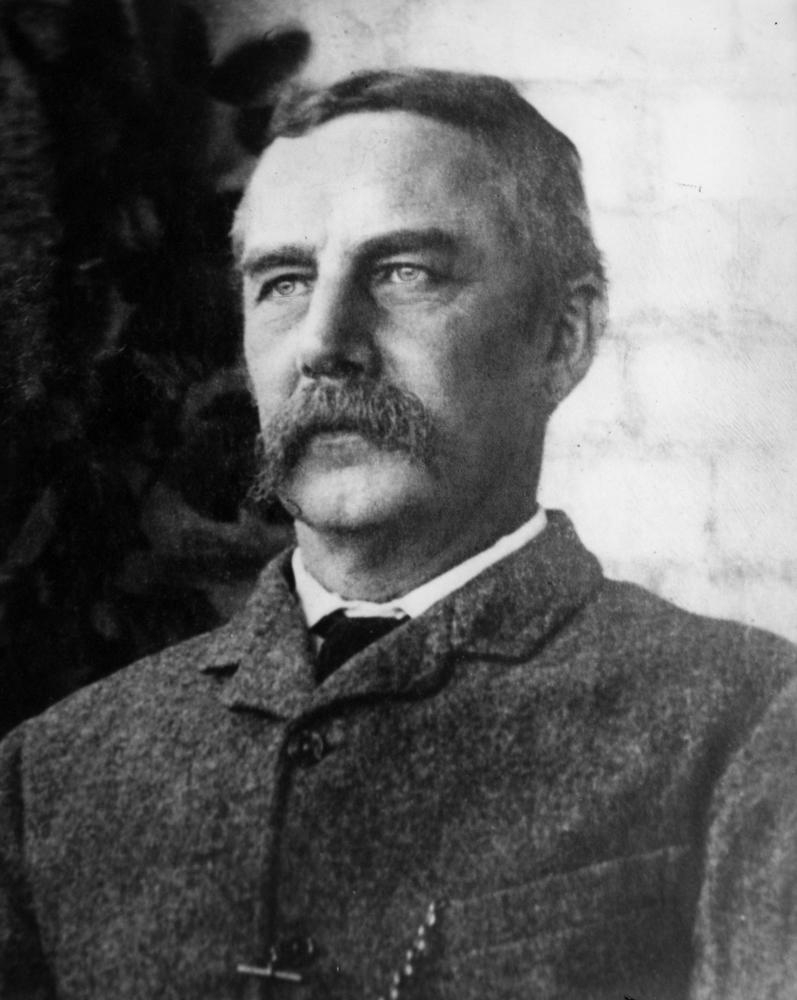
John Wheatcroft, First headmaster of the Rockhampton Grammar School, 1881-1906

From 1881 to 1886, the school maintained both a boys and a girls department. In 1906, Frederick William Wheatley succeeded the first Headmaster, John Wheatcroft. He was followed in 1912 by Henry Arthur Kellow who remained as Head until 1935.

A war memorial containing the names of a number of old boys, who served in World War I was unveiled by the Australian Governor-General, Lord Foster in 1921. It was funded by subscriptions and was designed by architects Hockings and Palmer, based on an idea of Headmaster Kellow. It was executed in Ulam white marble by FM Allan. The brick base faced with granite was completed later in 1924. A war trophy, a German trench mortar, was also acquired by the school in 1921.

In 1928, the PF MacDonald Memorial Pool was erected to the design of Hockings and Palmer. During the depression, improvements made under the Government Intermittent Relief Scheme included new tennis courts and the building of a road from the pool to Wheatcroft Street. Other improvements to the grounds were made in the 1930s when the advice of Botanic Gardens Curator HG Simmons were sought for tree planting and landscaping.

Old boy Fitzroy Jardine was appointed Headmaster in 1936, remaining in the position until 1964. A number of building works were undertaken during this time. Additions were made to the north wing of the main building in 1940 to provide accommodation for two classrooms and a dormitory. At the end of World War II, two buildings were purchased from the military camp at Raglan. These were used as a dormitory and recreation room for boarders. Further alterations were made to the main building in 1951. This included the enclosing of the south verandah and the enlarging of the dining room.

In 1957, the gymnasium (1889) was demolished to make way for the construction of the Jardine Science Block and the Boland Wing. In the same year, the Old Boys club rooms were moved to the school from Denham Street to become the Second World War Memorial Hall. In 1960, the memorial drinking fountain was dedicated in memory of nine boys killed that year in a plane crash. The Macfarlane Wing was erected in 1965. A large building program was commenced in the 1970s. Works included the Headmaster's residence (1970), the Palmer Wing (1970), the library and resource centre (1972), the Woolcock Science Block (1973), and the building of a second oval (1975).

In 1972, Arthur Edward Cross Butler succeed Malcolm Thomas Hewitson as Headmaster and in 1977, the school became coeducational and a girls dormitory was erected. Extensive alterations were carried out to the Main Building, including the replacing of the brick fronts and removal of balconies. The bell's tower was replaced with steel in 1986. Further additions to the building were made in 1987 with the construction of a wing to the rear.

Recent building work includes the Centenary Centre (1981), tennis courts (1981), assembly area (1984), library and humanities centre (1987), primary department stage 1 (1989) and stage 2 (1990).

== Description ==
The Rockhampton Grammar School is sited to the north east of a ridge of the Athelstane Range overlooking Rockhampton. The site, bounded by Agnes, Archer, and Quarry Streets, comprises a number of buildings erected from 1880 to the present.

The Administration Building is the primary building of the group. It is a two storeyed brick building with a U-shaped plan and a symmetrically composed eastern elevation consisting of three projecting bays. Most of the building has been extensively altered; however, the exterior of the central projecting bay, formerly the main entrance, and the interior of the trophy room remain substantially intact.

The central projecting bay has a brick base, a terrace to the first floor, and is surmounted by a pediment which spans the width of the bay. An octagonal belvedere rises above the roof line. The brick base has white rendered quoins, and two arched windows with rendered concrete surrounds and keystones. The windows flank a doorway with belted columns, Ionic capitals and a small pediment. The terrace has two slender round columns with broader square piers at the corners, each with Ionic capitals. The pediment has floral scrolls and a central school insignia in relief. The belvedere comprises an octagonal pitched roof on eight round columns with Ionic capitals, with a braced timber balustrade. The roof has a tall weathervane, and a bell hangs from a frame to the soffit.

The trophy room is located on the ground floor of the northern wing, within a student common area. The room is encircled with timber honour rolls, and has timber French doors with timber surrounds. The centrepiece of this room is a war memorial consisting of a white marble plaque with a richly carved pediment and entablature on round columns. The plaque and surrounds sit on a granite base which has a black marble plaque.

The exterior of the central bay and elements of the trophy room are finely detailed. The grounds surrounding the Administration Building include a number of mature trees.

A small timber pavilion c. 1910 is situated on the western side of the upper oval

== Heritage listing ==
Rockhampton Grammar School was listed on the Queensland Heritage Register on 21 October 1992 having satisfied the following criteria.

The place is important in demonstrating the evolution or pattern of Queensland's history.

Rockhampton Grammar School, opened in 1881, is important in demonstrating the evolution and pattern of Queensland's history, in particular the history of education in the state and the role of the Grammar Schools in the secondary school system, and the development of Rockhampton.

The place is important because of its aesthetic significance.

It is important in exhibiting a range of aesthetic characteristics valued by the community, in particular its contribution to the townscape as a landmark, and the finely detailed elements of the Administration Building to the external eastern central bay and the trophy room The place has a special association with the community of the Rockhampton Grammar School for social and cultural reasons.

The place has a strong or special association with a particular community or cultural group for social, cultural or spiritual reasons.

It has a special association with the life and work of Trustees, Headmasters, teachers, students, and others associated with the school.

The place has a special association with the life or work of a particular person, group or organisation of importance in Queensland's history.

It has a special association with the work of Rockhampton architect Sidney Williams.
