= Electoral district of Blackall =

Former electoral district of Queensland

Blackall Queensland—Legislative Assembly
- State: Queensland
- Created: 1873
- Abolished: 1888
- Demographic: Rural

Blackall was a Legislative Assembly electorate in the state of Queensland from 1873 to 1888.

== History ==
Blackall was established in 1873 as a single-member constituency by the 1872 Electoral Districts Act and covered the rural surrounding areas of Rockhampton from the coast to the ranges. It was abolished in the 1887 redistribution, being split up into two new electorates, Electoral district of Fitzroy and Electoral district of Rockhampton North, and the existing Electoral district of Normanby.

== Members ==
The following representatives were elected to the seat of Blackall:

Member	Party	Term
Peter Fitzallan MacDonald		18 Nov. 1873 – 28 Nov. 1878
Archibald Archer	Independent	28 Nov. 1878 – 23 Jan. 1886
William Pattison		13 Apr. 1886 – 5 May 1888

== See also ==
- Electoral districts of Queensland
- Members of the Queensland Legislative Assembly by year
- Category:Members of the Queensland Legislative Assembly by name
