= Donna Kirkland =

Australian politician

Donna Kirkland MP

Member of the Queensland Legislative Assembly for Rockhampton
- Incumbent
- Assumed office 26 October 2024
- Preceded by: Barry O'Rourke

Member of the Rockhampton Regional Council for Division 7
- In office 28 March 2020 – 16 March 2024
- Preceded by: Stephen Schwarten
- Succeeded by: Marika Taylor

Personal details
- Born: Forster, New South Wales, Australia
- Party: Liberal National

Donna Marcia Kirkland is an Australian politician.

She was elected member of the Legislative Assembly of Queensland for Rockhampton in the 2024 Queensland state election.

== Political career ==
=== Local government ===
Kirkland first attempted to enter politics at the 2016 Queensland local elections when she contested Rockhampton Regional Council's Division 7. However, she was narrowly beaten by incumbent Stephen Schwarten.

Recontesting the division at the 2020 Queensland local elections, Kirkland was successful in getting elected, defeating her only opponent Noeleen Horan.

After the resignation of mayor Margaret Strelow in 2020, Kirkland was one of a record 17 candidates to contest the 2021 Rockhampton mayoral by-election. Attracting more than 9% of the primary vote, Kirkland polled in fifth position behind Tony Williams, Chris "Pineapple" Hooper, Russell Claus and Cherie Rutherford.

Amid the COVID-19 pandemic in November 2021, Kirkland declined to publicly declare whether or not she was vaccinated, stating: “As the opportunity to partake in Covid-19 vaccination, currently considered our best defence against Covid, is not mandatory and is completely on a voluntary basis, it is my understanding that everyone’s decision in this is, and any other medical procedure, retains the right to personal choice and privacy.”

=== State government ===
In October 2023, Queensland opposition leader David Crusafulli announced Kirkland as the LNP's candidate for the seat of Rockhampton at the 2024 Queensland state election.

At a press conference on 11 October 2024 during the election campaign, Kirkland was questioned about her stance on Queensland's abortion laws when it was revealed she had shared a pro-life Facebook post from the Australian Christians Party in 2019 and described abortion as "the greatest human rights abuse of our time." Questioned about potential changes to Queensland abortion laws if the LNP were elected as well as her own personal views, Kirkland repeatedly said "it's not a part of our plan" and "we have ruled it out" before Crusafulli stepped in to take questions.

In the 2024 election, Kirkland defeated Labor candidate Craig Marshall to win the seat of Rockhampton for the LNP. On 10 November, it was announced that Kirkland had been appointed as the Assistant Minister for Mental Health, Drug and Alcohol Treatment, Families and Seniors and Central Queensland in the new Crisafulli ministry.

== Personal life ==
Kirkland is a mother of 6 and a grandmother of 17.
