= 2021 Rockhampton mayoral by-election =

← 2020	23 January 2021	2024 →
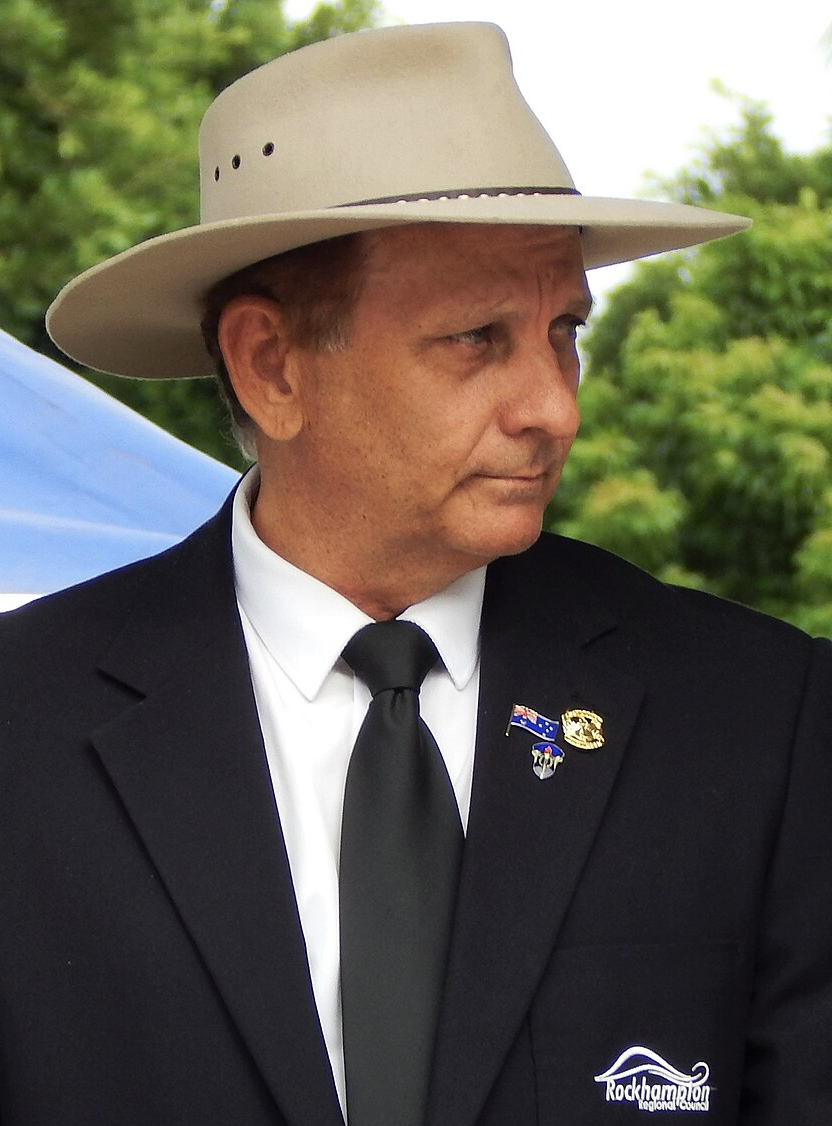
	First party	Second party
		IND
Candidate	Tony Williams	Russell Claus
Party	Ind. Labor	Independent
Primary vote	11,103	6,975
Percentage	24.82%	15.59%
Swing	▲24.82	▲15.59
TCP	58.57%	41.24
TCP swing	▲58.57	▲41.24
	Third party	Fourth party
	IND	IND
Candidate	Chris Hooper	Cherie Rutherford
Party	Independent	Independent
Primary vote	5,491	4,560
Percentage	12.28%	10.19%
Swing	▼18.87	▲10.19
Mayor before election
Margaret Strelow
Independent
Elected Mayor
Tony Williams
Ind. Labor

The 2021 Rockhampton mayoral by-election was held on 23 January 2021 to elect the mayor of the Rockhampton Region in Queensland, Australia.

The by-election was triggered by the resignation of long-serving mayor Margaret Strelow, who resigned on 9 November 2020 after the Councillor Conduct Tribunal found that she had engaged in misconduct.

Her resignation came just seven months after she had been re-elected as mayor of Rockhampton Regional Council at the 2020 Queensland local elections, where she was elected with 68.85% of the vote ahead of her only competitor, anti-mining environmentalist Chris "Pineapple" Hooper who achieved 31.15% of the vote.

With a record field of 17 candidates, the by-election attracted considerable media interest.

== Background ==
Following the 2020 local elections, it came to light that the Queensland Government had passed an Electoral and Other Legislation Bill which effectively changed local government legislation so that in the event a mayor should resign or become incapacitated within twelve months following an election, a by-election would not be required. It meant that the person with the second highest votes at the preceding mayoral election would instead become the mayor by default.

Strelow strongly objected to this change, as did Gladstone Region mayor Matt Burnett and Shadow Minister for Local Government, Ann Leahy. Leahy said that a runner-up filling the vacancy after an election was a "significant departure from the existing legislation" and pondered how appointing a runner-up could be a reflection of the electorate's wishes if, hypothetically, they had won just 11% of the vote but the departing mayor had managed to win with 80% of the vote.

In defence of the bill, Local Government Minister Stirling Hinchliffe said the changes were to discourage newly elected mayors and councillors from leaving the office to which they had just been elected, particularly when local and state elections were held just seven months apart every four years, as well as to respond to concerns raised by councils about the expense of by-elections.

Prior to her resignation, Strelow attracted media attention after she posted a video of herself covered in bubble wrap on Facebook to illustrate how cautious she was being, fearing that something may happen to her which could see Hooper become mayor.

== Councillor Conduct Tribunal findings ==
In November 2020, the Councillor Conduct Tribunal found Strelow to have engaged in misconduct after she had failed to update her Register of Interests to include a hospitality benefit from mining company Adani following an official trip to India with other dignitaries including Queensland premier Annastacia Palaszczuk and other mayors from Queensland in 2017.

Adani had paid for flights and for a dinner, totalling $1,670 per person.

The Office of Independent Assessments wrote to the council's CEO again in June 2019 requesting action be taken. But after Strelow failed to mention Adani's hospitality from the India trip, they handed down a decision on 2 June 2020, finding Strelow to have engaged to misconduct, ordering her to apologise, make the necessary changes to her Register of Interests and then undergo training.

=== Strelow's resignation ===
Strelow announced her resignation on 9 November 2020.

In an address on her Facebook page, Strelow said her refusal to agree that she had been compromised by the visit to India was a matter of personal integrity and said she could not agree that a reasonable person would have believed she had been compromised. She also added that she had acted in accordance with her own conscience and on the advice of senior legal practitioners and officers from the Department of Local Government.

Her resignation prompted a series of tributes from local Central Queensland community and business leaders including from the Capricornia Chamber of Commerce, Regional Development Australia, SMW Group and Bravus.

Despite deputy mayor Neil Fisher being appointed as the acting mayor of Rockhampton Regional Council in Strelow's absence, there was confusion as to who Strelow's successor would be.

With the well-publicised changes to the local government legislation in state parliament, some local media outlets assumed that as runner-up in the mayoral election held earlier in the year, Chris "Pineapple" Hooper had essentially become the mayor-elect by default, which prompted a slew of national media stories about the unusual situation.

However, soon after Strelow's resignation, Local Government Minister Stirling Hinchliffe announced that a new bill would be introduced and swiftly passed through state parliament to amend the legislation, retrospectively reverting it back to ensure a by-election would be held.

Hooper attempted to enter a council meeting at City Hall to be sworn in as mayor after accepting the offer, but was prevented from doing so.

A review by QCAT in April 2024 found that Strelow had not engaged in misconduct and that the official hospitality was not required to have been listed on the particular register.

== Mayoral by-election ==
A by-election was subsequently called for Saturday, 23 January 2021.

It was Rockhampton's first mayoral by-election since 31 October 1953, which was held following the resignation of mayor Rex Pilbeam, who had been elected to office the previous year. Pilbeam resigned after finding himself embroiled in a public scandal after suffering a serious gunshot wound when an attempt was made on his life by his mistress, who attempted to murder him on 8 June 1953. In that instance, Pilbeam stood in the ensuing by-election where he was re-elected. He went on to serve as the mayor of Rockhampton City Council for thirty years until he was defeated in 1982, while also concurrently serving as the state MP for Rockhampton South from 1960 until 1969.

A record total of 17 candidates contested the mayoral by-election, including Hooper and four sitting councillors, Tony Williams (Division 3), Cherie Rutherford (Division 5), Donna Kirkland (Division 7) and Shane Latcham (Division 1).

Other contenders were urban strategist Russell Claus, mine worker Bronwyn Laverty-Young, driving instructor Leyland Barnett, logistics specialist Christian Shepherd, fruit and vegetable retailer Dominic Doblo, Sir Graham McCamley's grandson Remy McCamley, sports administrator Rob Crowe, camera operator Christopher Davies, pastor John Rewald, Bulloo Shire finance manager Brett Williams, teacher Miranda Broadbent and business strategist Nyree Johnson.

== Results ==
2021 Rockhampton mayoral by-election
Party	Candidate	Votes	%	±%
Independent Labor	Tony Williams	11,103	24.82	+24.82
Independent	Russell Claus	6,975	15.59	+15.59
Independent	Chris Hooper	5,491	12.28	−18.87
Independent	Cherie Rutherford	4,560	10.19	+10.19
Independent	Donna Kirkland	4,094	9.15	+9.15
Independent	Nyree Johnson	3,232	7.23	+7.23
Independent	Dominic Doblo	2,539	5.68	+5.68
Independent	Rob Crow	1,748	3.91	+3.91
Independent	Shane Latcham	1,139	2.55	+2.55
Independent	John Rewald	930	2.08	+2.08
Independent KAP	Christian Shepherd	758	1.69	+1.69
Independent	Miranda Broadbent	633	1.42	+1.42
Independent LNP	Leyland Barnett	573	1.28	+1.28
Independent	Bronwyn Laverty-Young	289	0.65	+0.65
Independent	Remy McCamley	235	0.53	+0.53
Independent	Brett Williams	226	0.51	+0.51
Independent	Christopher Davies	203	0.45	+0.45
Total formal votes		44,728	97.44	
Informal votes		1,174	2.56	
Turnout		45,902	82.14	
Two-candidate-preferred result
Labor	Tony Williams	15,957	58.57	+58.57
Independent	Russell Claus	11,184	41.24	+41.24
Independent Labor gain from Independent		Swing	N/A	

== Aftermath ==
Due to Williams being elected as mayor, another by-election was called to fill his vacancy in Division 3, which was uncontested in 2020.

The by-election was held on 13 March 2021 and won by independent Grant Mathers, a former sales and corporate events manager who had worked as the site manager at Beef Australia in 2015. He is also the brother of sitting Division 5 councillor Cherie Rutherford.

2021 Rockhampton Region Division 3 by-election
Party	Candidate	Votes	%	±%
Independent	Grant Mathers	2,082	45.88	+45.88
Independent	Deanna Beatson	1,397	30.78	+30.78
Independent LNP	Leyland Barnett	451	9.94	+9.94
Indendent KAP	Christian Shepherd	414	9.12	+9.12
Independent	Dave Bauer	194	4.28	+4.28
Total formal votes		4538	95.38	
Informal votes		220	4.62	
Turnout		4758	100.00	
Independent gain from Independent Labor		Swing	N/A	
