= Peter Fitzallan MacDonald =

Australian politician

Peter MacDonald
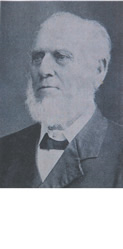

Member of the Queensland Legislative Assembly for Blackall
- In office 18 November 1873 – 28 November 1878
- Preceded by: New seat
- Succeeded by: Archibald Archer

Personal details
- Born: Peter Fitzallan MacDonald; 4 September 1830 Campbelltown, New South Wales, Australia
- Died: 19 June 1919 (aged 88) Rockhampton, Queensland, Australia
- Resting place: Yaamba Cemetery
- Spouse: Julia Louise Ayrey (b.1861 d.1920)
- Relatives: John Graham MacDonald (brother)
- Occupation: Gold miner, Grazier, Squatter

Peter Fitzallan MacDonald (4 September 1830 – 19 June 1919) was an Australian politician. He was a Member of the Queensland Legislative Assembly.

== Early life ==
MacDonald was born in Campbelltown, New South Wales to Alexander Macdonald and his wife Sarah (née Warby). He was educated at The King's School, Parramatta, and gained farming experience before heading to the Victorian goldfields and later becoming manager of Ingleby station near Geelong.

He arrived in Queensland in 1857 and soon set out on a series of pastoral explorations with fellow squatters and aboriginal guides with the plan of taking up as many leases as possible. In May 1859 while living at Yaamba, he joined his brother John Graham MacDonald on an exploration tour of the head waters of the Nogoa and Belyando Rivers, where they took up a large area of pastoral country.

One such property, Cullinlaringo, which he had sold to Horatio Wills in 1860, was the scene where the Cullin-La-Ringo massacre occurred in 1861. MacDonald was one of the group who set out to avenge the slaughter.

== Politics ==
MacDonald entered state politics in 1873, winning the seat of Blackall. A supporter of Samuel Griffith, he supported secular education and liberal land legislation.

In 1869, he sued The Crown for resuming western leaseholds he owned. Known as "The Great Northern Run", the case dragged on until in 1880 he was awarded £22,700. For this he was attacked for using the parliament to further his own interests as opposed to his constituents.

In 1876, he announced he was sick of politics and did not stand for re-election in 1878. He stood for the seat of Rockhampton North in 1888 but was defeated by Rees Jones.

== Later life ==
MacDonald became more conservative and in 1890–1891, he set out to thwart the Shearer's union by employing non-union labor. As well as his pastoral leases, he purchased hotels throughout Queensland as well as the Northern Argus newspaper and a meat works at Lakes Creek, both based in Rockhampton.

== Personal life ==
In Geelong in 1861 he married Julia Louise Ayrey, the orphaned daughter of a wealthy Western District pastoralist and together they had seven children.

MacDonald died in Rockhampton in 1919 and was buried at Yaamba Cemetery. He was survived by his wife, two sons, and two daughters.

Parliament of Queensland
New seat	Member for Blackall; 1873–1878	Succeeded by Archibald Archer
