= St Andrew's Presbyterian Church, Rockhampton =

St Andrew's Presbyterian Church (former)
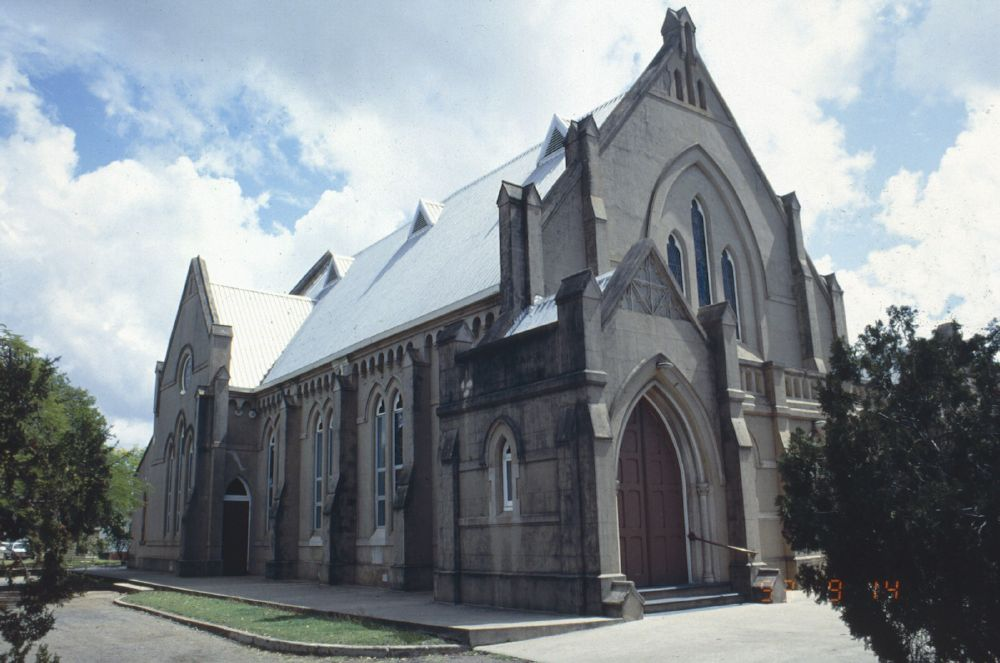
- The former St Andrew's Presbyterian Church, 1993
- St Andrew's Presbyterian Church (former)
- 23°22′58″S 150°30′53″E
- Address: 280 Bolsover Street, in the central business district of Rockhampton, Rockhampton Region, Queensland
- Country: Australia
- Previous denomination: Presbyterian (1893 – 2002)

History
- Status: Church (former)
- Founded: 7 June 1893
- Founder: Mrs Peter McIntosh on behalf of the Presbytery of Rockhampton
- Dedication: Saint Andrew
- Dedicated: 15 April 1894 by Rev. Dr McSwaine

Architecture
- Functional status: Closed and sold
- Architects: Voller & Graham; John William Wilson
- Architectural type: Church (former)
- Style: Gothic Revival
- Years built: 1893 – 1926
- Closed: October 2002

Specifications
- Materials: Rendered masonry

Queensland Heritage Register
- Official name: St Andrew's Presbyterian Church (former)
- Type: State heritage (built)
- Designated: 21 October 1992
- Reference no.: 600785
- Significant period: 1880s–1890s (historical); 1890s–1920s (fabric)
- Significant components: Stained glass window/s, church, pipe organ, memorial/monument, furniture/fittings

St Andrew's Presbyterian Church is a heritage-listed former Presbyterian church at 280 Bolsover Street, in the central business district of Rockhampton, Rockhampton Region, Queensland, Australia. The former church was designed by Voller & Graham in the Gothic Revival style and built from 1893 to 1926. The former church was added to the Queensland Heritage Register on 21 October 1992.

In October 2002 the former church was closed on the basis of concerns around the structural integrity of the building. The congregation relocated to the site of the former Rockhampton cinema building, and became known as the Rockhampton Presbyterian Church. The former church building was sold and has since been renovated as The Church Events Venue.

== History ==
The former St Andrew's Presbyterian Church was erected in 1893–94 for the Presbytery of Rockhampton formed in 1865. Architects were invited to submit plans for the church and the design of Brisbane architects Voller & Graham was chosen. Construction of the building was supervised by prominent Rockhampton architect John William Wilson and built by Walter Adam Lawson. The erection of the former church was funded by a donation of £1000 from the William Pattison which was accepted by the Presbytery on 7 June 1893. The former church exemplifies a stage of prestigious development in Rockhampton which was a reflection of the wealth from the Mount Morgan Mine.

=== First church building ===
Presbyterian worship commenced in Rockhampton shortly after the population explosion caused by the Canoona gold rush of 1858. William John Brown, Sub-collector of Customs, was a member of the Presbyterian Church of Ireland and conducted the first Presbyterian services in Palmer's store, Grant's timber yard and the local Court House. A building for worship was erected by all denominations for common use on ground which was granted to the Church of England. The building was ultimately left to that denomination.

Early in 1861, Rev. Samuel Kelly, formerly of the Presbyterian Church of Ireland, was invited to Rockhampton with a view to taking up a ministry. A public meeting was held on 28 May 1861 where a committee was appointed to establish a Presbyterian Church. Samuel Kelly became the first Presbyterian Minister of Rockhampton on 1 June 1861. The committee obtained a grant of one acre (zero point four zero hectares) of land from the Government on which a timber church was erected on the site of the present church. In 1864 a manse was erected on the southeast side of the church for Rev. Alexander Campbell Smith corresponding with the rapid growth of the congregation.

In March 1876, Rev. Alexander Hay, formerly of South Brisbane, entered the Rockhampton Ministry and in 1878 a second manse was erected. In 1882, to accommodate the increasing congregation, a transept was added and enlarged the first church original timber structure .

In 1888, a separate Presbyterian congregation was established in Rockhampton but the original congregation continued to prosper.

=== Second church building ===
On 2 October 1890, Hay announced a promise of a donation of £1000 from Mount Morgan Gold Mine shareholder William Pattison MLA, towards the erection of a new church. In 1894 the Parish of St Andrew's acquired an additional loan of £800 from the Bank of New South Wales which was granted to the Trustees of St Andrew's Presbyterian Church, namely William Burns, William Pattison, and Alexander Meikle. The St Andrew's Presbyterian Act of 1891 had changed the nominated trustees from the original three who had all died. Up until its 2002 closure and subsequent sale, the former church was one of only two Presbyterian Churches (the other being the Ann Street Presbyterian Church in Brisbane) that were owned by the trustees of the church and not the Presbyterian Church of Queensland.

The foundation stone was laid on 7 June 1893 by Mrs Peter McIntosh, the daughter of William J. Brown, the founder of Presbyterianism in Rockhampton. At the laying of the foundation stone, William McIlwraith, editor and joint owner of the Rockhampton Morning Bulletin, read a brief history of events in Rockhampton and this was laid with copies of sermons by Dr Hay and his address to the General Assembly in 1891 in a bottle under the foundation stone. The former church was opened on 15 April 1894 by Rev. Dr McSwaine of St Paul's Church in Brisbane.

The building was originally constructed in tuck-pointed face brickwork with either stone or rendered facings. The original design of the former church had included a tower facing Bolsover Street but at an additional cost of £560 it was omitted. With the tower, the former St Andrew's Church would have borne marked similarity to the timber St Pauls Presbyterian Church in Mackay designed by Walter Carey Voller in 1898. The two stand as remarkably similar designs attributed to Voller for the Presbyterian Church of Queensland.

The interior walls of the former St Andrew's Church were originally painted a dark "French" grey and the channel arch and window facings were "pure" white and the pews were of Queensland Pine. The former church was lit by two "sunlights" and twelve gas brackets. The interior remained incomplete until the pipe organ was installed and officially opened on 29 June 1900. The organ was built by Sydney firm Charles Richardson & Co to the specifications of the St Andrew's organist, Frank Kavanagh, and to the design of L. S. Robertson. In 1897, a bell was donated to the church by John R. Palmer of Brisbane, possibly the son of John Palmer, the first Mayor of Rockhampton. The bell, cast in London, commemorates Queen Victoria's Diamond Jubilee (1837–97) and sits exposed at the south-west corner of the former church.

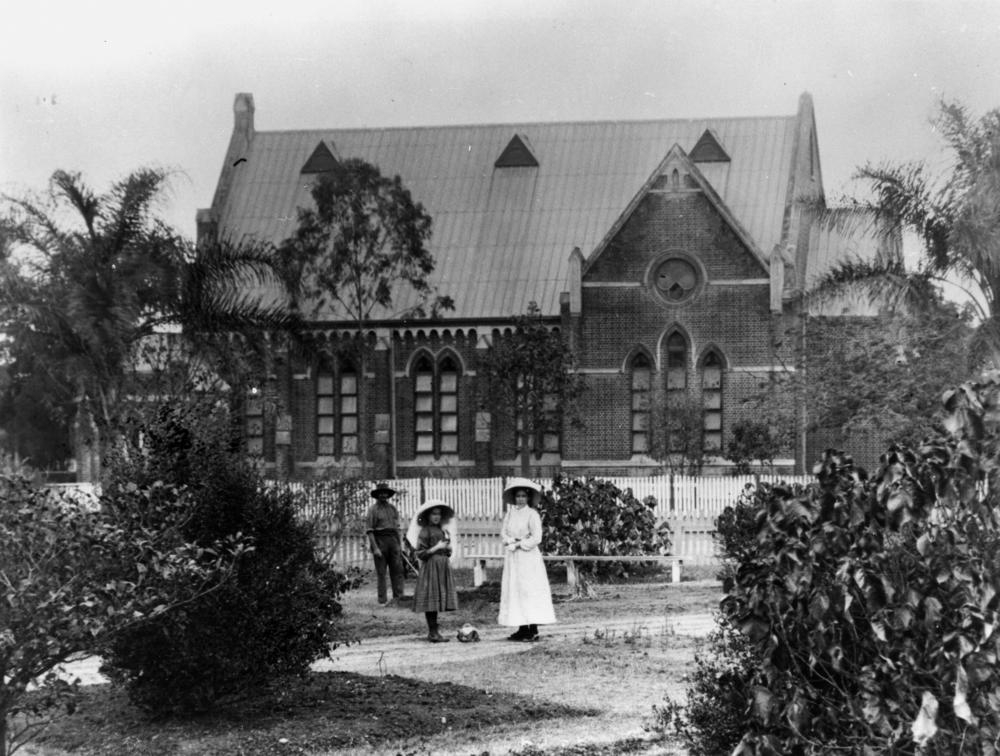
St Andrew's Presbyterian Church, circa 1912

By 1925, it was noted that the former church required underpinning due to foundation movement. In 1926, new communion furniture was installed and dedicated in the former church. In 1939 the congregation approved a plan to render the exterior of the former church, and an appeal was launched in 1940 to pay for it. In 1947 the fixtures and fittings were changed to allow for a new position for the pulpit, communion furniture and choir seats. A choir room was also built at this time. Between 1947 and 1971, the stained glass windows were installed. In 1981, a structural survey of the building was conducted, in response to which a substantial program of works was undertaken in 1984. The former church was closed for several months, and these works included laying a concrete apron around the exterior of the building; constructing a new roof and floor; inserting additional tie rods; repainting the exterior, and demolishing the bell tower.

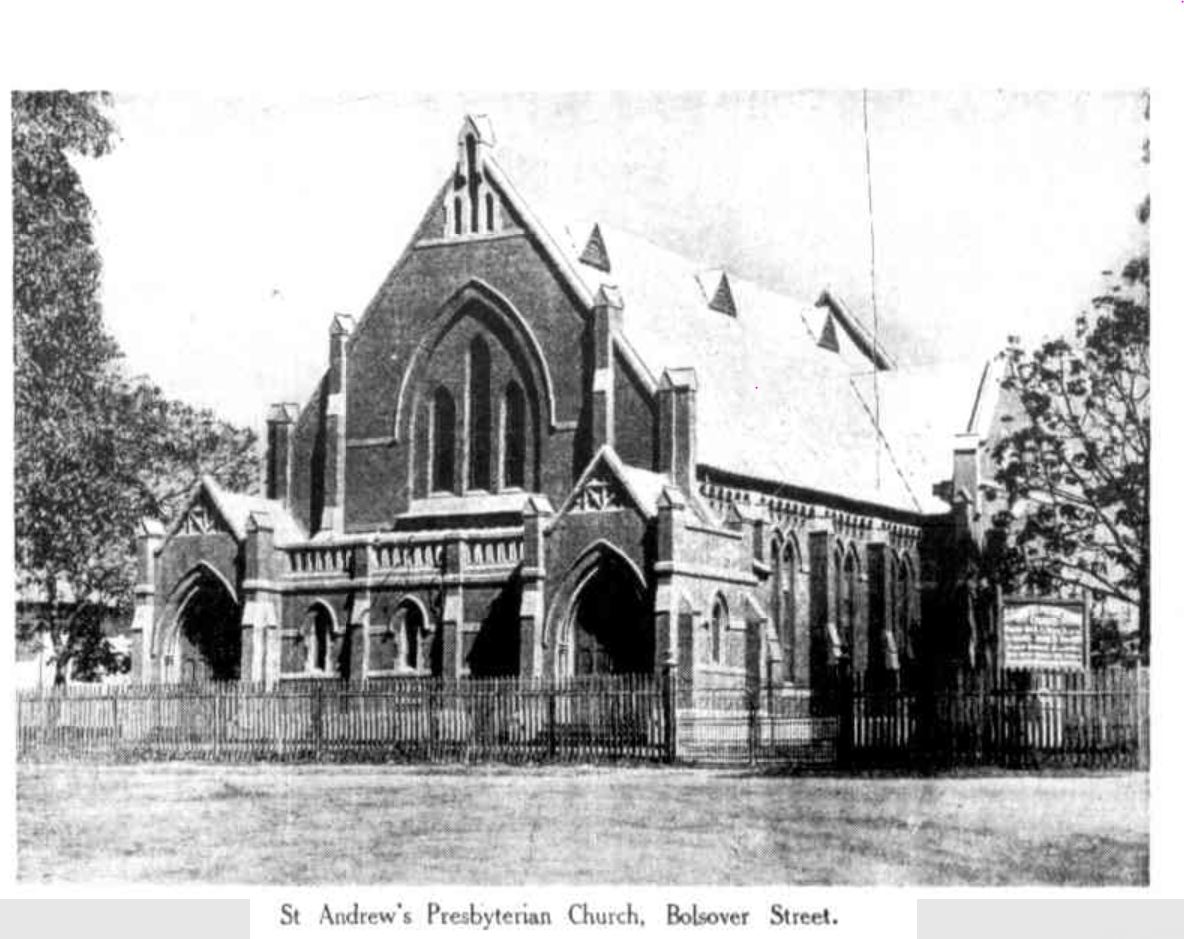
St Andrew's Presbyterian Church, 1936

A tender of £1,860 by P. C. Hook for the construction of a concrete building (the adjacent St Andrew's Hall) was accepted, and the Sunday School was officially opened on 18 July 1936 as part of the 75th celebrations. The old manse, which was located on the site of the new hall, was sold for removal for £210.

== Description ==
The former St Andrew's Church, located on a level site on the corner of Bolsover and Derby Streets, is a rendered masonry building with a ribbed metal gable roof with gablet ventilators. The building has buttressing, expressed string courses, and the render is scribed to imitate ashlar. The entrance to the former church faces Bolsover Street to the northeast.

The Bolsover Street elevation has a single-storeyed narthex flanked by projecting gabled entrance vestibules at either end, with the gable end of the nave behind. Each entrance has a pointed arch with expressed drip mould, paired timber panelled doors, and is framed by low engaged columns. Each gable is framed by buttresses crowned by gablets, and the top section of the gable has stone tracery. The northern entrance vestibule has a projecting curved section at the rear. The narthex has two lancets with expressed drip moulds and window surrounds, and is surmounted by a rendered balustrade parapet. The gable end of the nave has an inset central pointed arch with expressed drip mould and triple lancets. The gable is surmounted by triple lancet recesses crowned by a gablet.

The side elevations of the former church consist of four bays, containing paired lancet windows with expressed drip moulds, separated by buttresses and surmounted by a machicolation motif. Shallow transepts project, with a pointed arch opening with timber doors to the side, and triple lancet windows with expressed drip moulds to the end elevation. The lancets are surmounted by a circular window, and the gable is framed by narrow corbelled buttresses crowned by gablets. The apex of the gable has a narrow lancet recess.

The rear of the former church has a projecting gabled chancel with a low skillion roofed vestry on the southern side. The chancel has a central lancet window at the rear, and a wider lancet recess to the gable. The vestry has a pointed arch doorway at the rear, and a lancet window with expressed drip mould to the southern side. A concrete apron surrounds the building, and a memorial bell is located on the concrete apron adjacent to the vestry.

Internally, the former church has rendered walls, arched braced trusses supported by corbels, and raked boarded timber ceilings with roses to the central section. A large pointed arch with expressed extrados and drip mould opens to the chancel, which houses a large ornate pipe organ, in front of which is a raised pulpit. Many of the lancets contain stained glass or leadlight panels. The entrance vestibules and narthex have encaustic tiled floors, and three pointed arches separate the narthex and the nave. These arches have timber screens, with the side arches containing doors. A partitioned "crying room" has been constructed in the centre of the narthex, with a viewing panel inserted into the timber screen of the centre arch. The church contains a number of commemorative plaques, including First and Second World War memorials.

St Andrew's Hall is located on an adjoining site to the southeast of the former church, also fronting Bolsover Street. The site has car parking at the rear, and some substantial plantings between the two buildings.

In 2018, as part of its conversion to a hospitality venue, an external courtyard and octagonal pavilion were added to the complex, and the interior of the former church was repainted to the original colours.

== Heritage listing ==
The former St Andrew's Presbyterian Church was listed on the Queensland Heritage Register on 21 October 1992 having satisfied the following criteria.

The place is important in demonstrating the evolution or pattern of Queensland's history.

The former St Andrew's Presbyterian Church was constructed in 1894 during a period of immense wealth in Rockhampton due to gold mining in Mount Morgan. The establishment of this substantial brick church was directly tied to the influence of Mount Morgan Gold, as it was funded by Mount Morgan Gold Mining Company trustee and millionaire, William Pattison, MLA. It is an example of the prestigious development which occurred in Rockhampton at a time when it was the premier commercial centre of central Queensland and was promoted by the separation movement as the ideal capital for a new northern state. The former church also represented the expansion of the Presbyterian Church in Queensland. Established in 1861 the parish of St Andrew's was the first Presbyterian congregation to establish itself so far north in Queensland and the building reflects the prominence of the Presbyterian community in the early establishment of Rockhampton.

The place is important because of its aesthetic significance.

The former St Andrew's Presbyterian Church is of aesthetic significance, and through its form, fabric and materials, the building makes a significant contribution to the Rockhampton streetscape and townscape. The building also has fine interior materials and finishes, the detailing of which reflects a fine quality of workmanship.

The place has a strong or special association with a particular community or cultural group for social, cultural or spiritual reasons.

The former church has special association for the congregation of St Andrew's, being their former place of worship for over 100 years as well as for the people of Rockhampton as a prominent feature of the townscape which contributes to the image of the city.
