= Archibald Archer =

Australian politician

The Honourable Archibald Archer JP
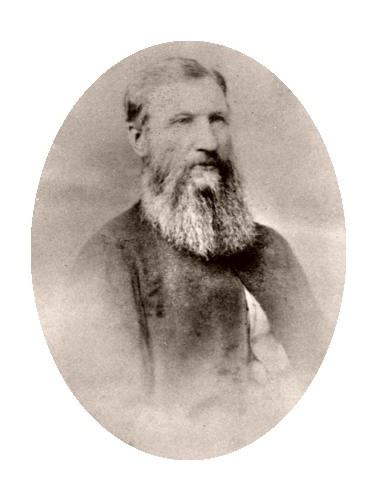

12th Treasurer of Queensland
- In office 5 January 1882 – 13 November 1883
- Preceded by: Thomas McIlwraith
- Succeeded by: James Francis Garrick
- Constituency: Blackall

Member of the Queensland Legislative Assembly for Rockhampton
- In office 27 July 1867 – 19 November 1869
- Preceded by: Thomas FitzGerald
- Succeeded by: Henry Milford
- In office 5 May 1888 – 4 April 1896 Serving with William Pattison, George Curtis
- Preceded by: John Ferguson
- Succeeded by: William Kidston

Member of the Queensland Legislative Assembly for Blackall
- In office 28 November 1878 – 23 January 1886
- Preceded by: Peter MacDonald
- Succeeded by: William Pattison

Personal details
- Born: 13 March 1820 Fife, Scotland
- Died: 6 February 1902 (aged 81) Larvik, Norway
- Relations: Archer brothers
- Occupation: Grazier, Agent-General

Archibald Archer M.L.A., J.P., (18 March 1820 – 6 February 1902) was a Queensland politician, a Member of the Queensland Legislative Assembly, and Treasurer of Queensland. He was one of the Archer brothers, an early Queensland pioneering family.

== Personal life ==
Archibald Archer was born in Fife, Scotland on 18 March 1820, the son of William Archer, of Larvik, Norway. At age 5, Archer went with his father to Norway and was educated in Norway. Later he spent five years in an engineering establishment in Scotland. Archer emigrated to Australia, where he arrived in 1842, but stayed only five months, subsequently spending thirteen years in the South Sea and Sandwich Islands. In the latter he was engaged on coffee and sugar plantations.

Returning to Queensland in 1860, Archer began residence at Gracemere station.

In 1896, Archer left Australia and died at the family's Norwegian estate, Tolderedden, Larvik, Norway on 6 February 1902 aged 81 years.

== Public life ==
Archer was elected to the Legislative Assembly of Queensland as the member for Rockhampton from 27 July 1867 to 19 November 1869, during which he assisted with passing the Land Act of 1868.

On 28 November 1878, Archer was elected again to the Legislative Assembly of Queensland as the member for the Electoral district of Blackall which title he possessed until 23 January 1886. During this term, he was Treasurer and Secretary for Public Instruction in the first Thomas McIlwraith Government from 5 January 1882 to 13 November 1883.

On 5 May 1888, Archer was elected again to the Legislative Assembly of Queensland as the member for Rockhampton (again) which he held until 4 April 1896. Archer was a strong advocate of the subdivision of Queensland. In 1892 Mr. Archer visited England in company with John Ferguson as a deputation on behalf of the Central Queensland Territorial Separation League.

== See also ==
- The Archer brothers

Parliament of Queensland
Preceded by Thomas FitzGerald	Member for Rockhampton; 1867–1869	Succeeded by Henry Milford
Preceded by Peter MacDonald	Member for Blackall; 1878–1886	Succeeded by William Pattison
Preceded by John Ferguson	Member for Rockhampton; 1888–1896; Served alongside: William Pattison, George Curtis	Succeeded by William Kidston
