= William Pattison (politician) =

Australian politician (1830–1896)

The Honourable William Pattison
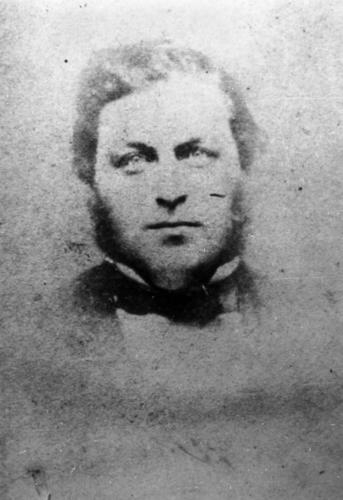
- Pattison in 1888

15th Treasurer of Queensland
- In office 30 November 1888 – 19 November 1889
- Preceded by: Thomas McIlwraith
- Succeeded by: John Donaldson
- Constituency: Electoral district of Rockhampton

Member of the Queensland Legislative Assembly for Blackall
- In office 13 April 1886 – 5 May 1888
- Preceded by: Archibald Archer
- Succeeded by: Seat abolished

Member of the Queensland Legislative Assembly for Rockhampton
- In office 5 May 1888 – 13 May 1893 Serving with Archibald Archer
- Preceded by: William Higson
- Succeeded by: George Curtis

Personal details
- Born: 23 May 1830 Hobart, Tasmania, Australia
- Died: 8 June 1896 (aged 66) Rockhampton, Queensland, Australia
- Resting place: South Rockhampton Cemetery
- Spouse(s): Helen Margaret Grant (m.1855 d.1877), Susan Annie Stephenson (m.1878)
- Occupation: Butcher, Dairy farmer, Gold miner, Grazier

Hon. William Pattison (23 May 1830 – 8 June 1896) was an Australian politician. He was a Member of the Queensland Legislative Assembly.

== Early life ==
Pattison was born in Hobart, and emigrated to Victoria and was a councillor of the city of Melbourne.

In August 1864, Pattison went to Queensland, and commenced business at Rockhampton, where he acquired a large interest in the Mount Morgan Gold Mining Company.

== Politics ==
Pattison, who has been Mayor of Rockhampton, succeeded Archibald Archer in the representation of Blackall in 1886, was elected for Rockhampton in 1888, and was a minister without portfolio in the Thomas McIlwraith ministry from June to November 1888. On the reconstitution of the Ministry he was Colonial Treasurer under Boyd Dunlop Morehead from November 1888 to November 1889, when he resigned the Treasurership. He was minister without portfolio till the retirement of the Morehead Government in August 1890.

== Later life ==
In June 1893, Pattison donated £1000 to erect St Andrew's Presbyterian Church in Rockhampton.

Pattison died on 8 June 1896, in Rockhampton, and was buried in South Rockhampton Cemetery.

Parliament of Queensland
Preceded by Archibald Archer	Member for Blackall; 1886–1888	Abolished
Preceded by William Higson	Member for Rockhampton; 1888–1893; Served alongside: Archibald Archer	Succeeded by George Curtis
