= George Curtis (Australian politician) =

Australian politician (1845–1922)

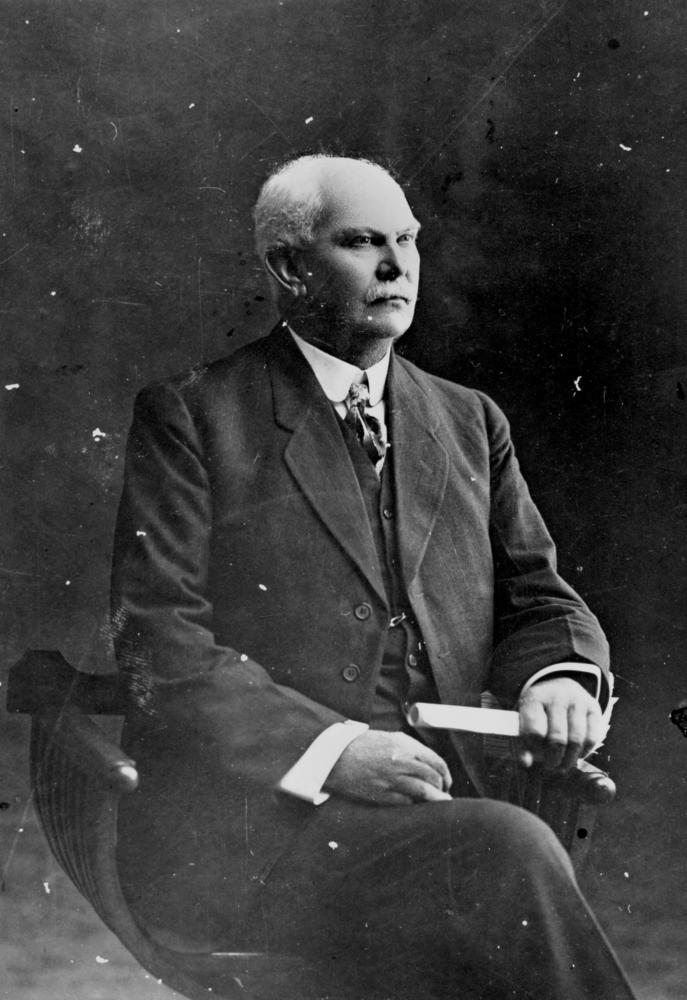

Member of the Queensland Legislative Assembly for Rockhampton
- In office 13 May 1893 – 11 March 1902 Serving with Archibald Archer, William Kidston
- Preceded by: William Pattison
- Succeeded by: Kenneth Grant

Member of the Queensland Legislative Council
- In office 3 July 1914 – 23 March 1922

Personal details
- Born: George Silas Curtis; 19 July 1845 Tamworth, New South Wales, Australia
- Died: 6 October 1922 (aged 77) Sydney, Australia
- Resting place: South Head Cemetery
- Party: Opposition
- Spouse: Dorinda Ann Parker (m. 1875 d. 1914 )
- Occupation: Auctioneer

George Silas Curtis (19 July 1845 – 6 October 1922) was an Australian politician. He was a member of the Queensland Parliament twice, first as the independent member for Rockhampton in the Legislative Assembly from 1893 to 1902, then as a conservative member of the Legislative Council from 1914 to 1922.

Parliament of Queensland
Preceded by William Pattison	Member for Rockhampton; 1893–1902; Served alongside: Archibald Archer, William Kidston	Succeeded by Kenneth Grant
