= William Rea (politician) =

Australian politician

Member of the Queensland Legislative Assembly for Rockhampton
- In office 15 November 1878 – 21 September 1881 Serving with Thomas Macdonald-Paterson
- Preceded by: New seat
- Succeeded by: John Ferguson

Personal details
- Born: William Rea; 1816 Belfast, Ireland
- Died: 21 September 1881 (aged 64 or 65) Brisbane, Queensland, Australia
- Resting place: Toowong Cemetery
- Occupation: Storekeeper

William Rea (1816–1881) was a stock and station agent and a politician in Queensland, Australia. He was a Member of the Queensland Legislative Assembly.

== Early life ==
William Rea was born in Belfast in 1816. He came to Australia in about 1841 where he worked in stock and station agency business with firms which had branches in New South Wales and New Zealand. Around the time of the separation of Queensland (circa 1859), he moved to Rockhampton where he established his own stock and station agency business with Mr Rankin.

== Politics ==
Rea was elected to the Queensland Legislative Assembly in the Electorate of Rockhampton on 15 November 1878. He held the seat until his death on 21 September 1881.

== Later life ==
Rea died on 21 September 1881 in his temporary residence at Martin Street, Fortitude Valley, Brisbane. He had been unwell for a few days beforehand and, having failed to attend Parliament, was found dead apparently from heart disease. At the time of his death, he was writing a letter in which he said he felt he was dying and fell to the floor with his pencil still in hand. He was buried on 22 September 1881 in Toowong Cemetery.

== See also ==
- Members of the Queensland Legislative Assembly, 1878–1883

Parliament of Queensland
| New seat | Member for Rockhampton; 1878–1881; Served alongside: Thomas Macdonald-Paterson | Succeeded by John Ferguson |
