= John Ferguson (Australian politician) =

Scottish-born Australian politician

The Honourable John Ferguson
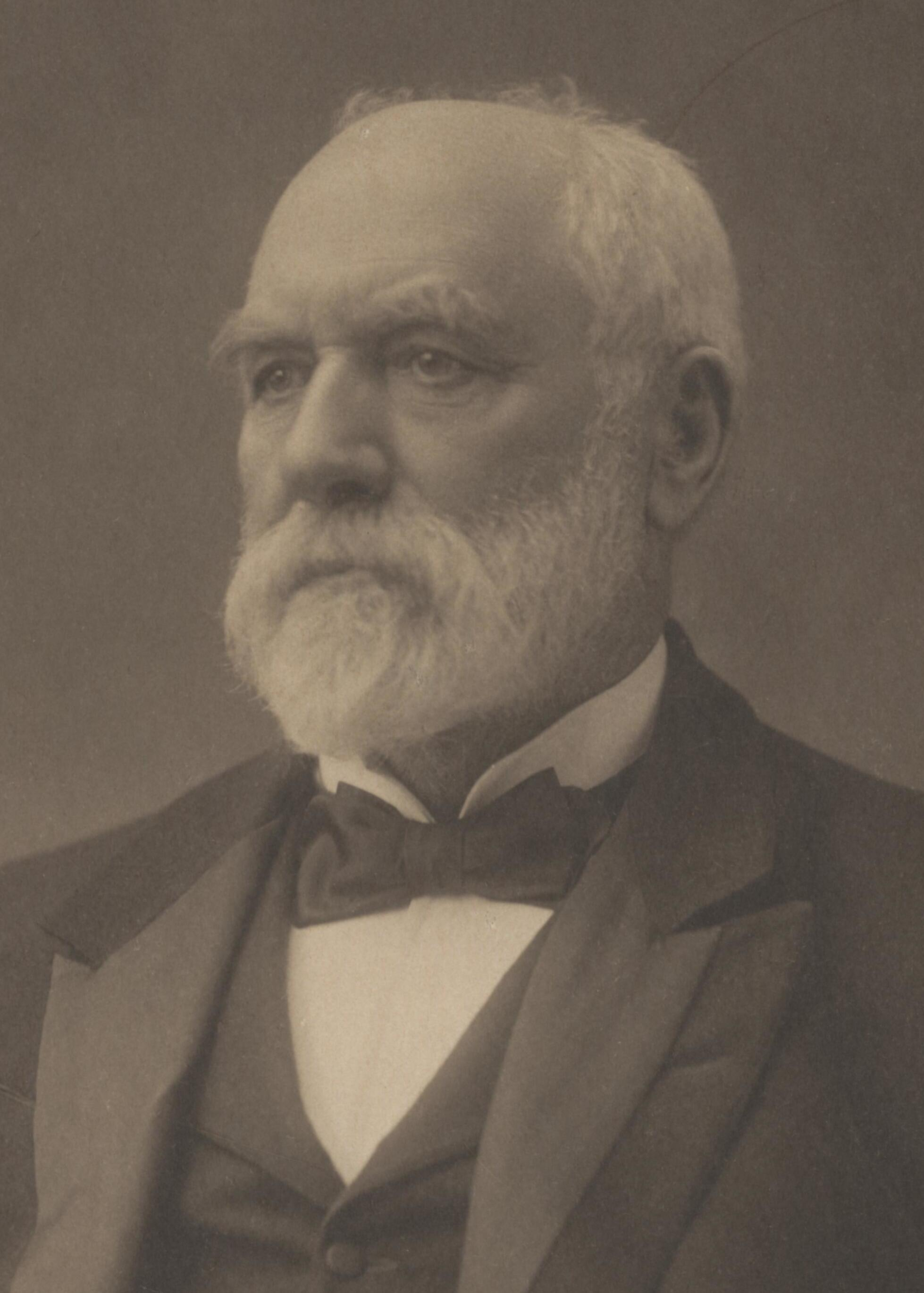

Senator for Queensland
- In office 30 March 1901 – 6 October 1903

Member of the Queensland Legislative Council
- In office 23 August 1894 – 30 March 1906

Member of the Queensland Legislative Assembly for Rockhampton
- In office 8 October 1881 – 5 May 1888 Serving with Thomas Macdonald-Paterson, William Higson
- Preceded by: William Rea
- Succeeded by: Archibald Archer

Personal details
- Born: John Ferguson; 15 March 1830 Kenmore, Perthshire, Scotland
- Died: 30 March 1906 (aged 76) Sydney, Australia
- Resting place: Waverley Cemetery
- Spouse: Eliza Frances Wiley (m.1862 d.1923)
- Occupation: Carpenter, Builder

John Ferguson (15 March 1830 – 30 March 1906) was a Scottish-born Australian politician.

He was described as 5 feet 8.5 inches (1.740 m) in height, 13 stone (180 lb; 83 kg) weight, medium build with a dark brown beard. Whilst he did consume alcohol, he was never drunk; and whilst not a brilliant orator, he always talked sensibly, "one of nature's gentlemen". He was a supporter of charitable causes.

== Early years ==
Born in Kenmore, Perthshire, Scotland, Ferguson received a primary education before becoming a carpenter. Working around Killin, he was fluent in Gaelic, and was 21 before he could start to speak English well.

Ferguson migrated to Australia in 1855, becoming a goldminer and carpenter, and then in 1861, newly married, moved to Rockhampton, Queensland as a builder and contractor. Through effort he became the largest building contractor in central Queensland.

In 1870–1, he constructed the workers cottages at the Lakes Creek meat works. Ferguson also constructed the early buildings of the Rockhampton Grammar School, and the now-heritage listed residence of Dr William Callaghan on Quay Street. Ferguson retired from the building trade in 1888, after becoming one of the half-dozen millionaires in Rockhampton, a result of his investing in the Mount Morgan Mine; The early purchase of shares in the copper, gold, and silver mine "made him a man of independent means".

== Rockhampton council (?–1884) ==
With the subdivision of the Rockhampton municipality, with seventeen candidates for nine positions spread across the three wards, Ferguson was known for his reliability and was duly elected to the Fitzroy Ward.

He served on the Rockhampton Council as mayor in 1880, 1881, and 1883. As mayor, he supported an extensive street-side tree planting scheme. As a tribute of his support as mayor for Central Queensland, a song was written in his name, to the tune of John Barleycorn.

Now a state MLA, Ferguson resigned from the Fitzroy Ward and local government by January 1884.

== Queensland parliament (MLA 1881–1888, MLC 1894–1906) ==
In 1881 he was elected to the Legislative Assembly of Queensland for Rockhampton, holding the seat until 1888. His personal popularity saw large voting majorities. He also was an inaugural office-bearer of the newly formed Central Queensland Caledonian Society in November of that year.

In 1888, Ferguson became the inaugural president of the Rockhampton Club, and later, one of three trustee until his death.

By 1890, Ferguson was first president of the Rockhampton branch of the Central Queensland Territorial Separation League, where he noted:

We are bound to meet with opposition from Brisbane, but that always has been the case all over the world wherever a movement of this kind has been started. I remember well the agitation got up in the Moreton Bay district to get separation from New South Wales, and I had the privilege of signing a petition presented to her Majesty by the people of Moreton Bay, and the same arguments are being used now that were used than.

As president, in 1892 he proceeded with a delegation to the Colonial Office, London, to personally petition the separation question, as previous petitions were unsuccessful. He returned on Tuesday 13 September 1892. The League became quieter after the 1901 Federation of Australia,) although even as an inaugural member of the Australian Senate, in June 1901 he was raising dividing the current State of Queensland into three separate states.

Ferguson was against the import of Kanakas and Coolies as labourers, but this was suggested to be a white Australia position.

In 1894 he was appointed to the Queensland Legislative Council. In the same year he and his family spelt almost the entire year holidaying in Great Britain.

Also in the same year, Ferguson went on to build the mansion residence of Kenmore House, which he named after his birthplace in Scotland. It was also expected at the time that he would also become the first Governor of the separated state, should this objective be achieved and that Kenmore House would be Government House. (Kenmore House later became the Mater Misericordiae Hospital.)

In early 1888, Ferguson and his family sailed to England, for two or more years.

In 1901, he visited Great Britain and the continent, including spending two weeks at the Paris Exhibition. He left Marseille onboard the P&O steamer Victoria, and reached Adelaide on 1 April 1901.

== Australian Senate (1901–1903) ==
Ferguson successfully contested the Australian Senate in the 1901 federal election – but was the only nominee, and a second candidate withdrew his own nomination upon learning Ferguson was a candidate. He did not resign his seat in Queensland's Legislative Council. (Holding seats in both state and federal legislatures simultaneously was not yet forbidden by the Commonwealth Electoral Act 1902.) He duly became one of Queensland's first six senators in the new Commonwealth of Australia, and was considered attentive and diligent in his efforts.

Whilst Ferguson was pro-trade and against interstate customs tariffs, no evidence has been found that he was a member of the Sydney-based Free-trade Party. He took his views of dividing the Colony of Queensland into three separate colonies to the Senate as well with his inaugural speech espousing:

federal members will see that it will be to the great advantage of the Commonwealth as a whole that Queensland should be formed into three separate States. It is impossible for a territory of 668,000 square miles, with a seaboard of over-2000 miles, and the seat of Government in the extreme southern corner to be governed or developed as it should be.

One of his ideas was raised by June 1901 and later progressed, namely "the construction and building of the proposed capital":

I hope that a territory can be found in the mother state beyond the 100 mile limit from Sydney fairly central, and having respect to climate and elevation sufficient to ensure a thorough system of draining, a water supply of the very best, and, if possible, by gravitation and accessibility, fulfilling other conditions, such as nearness to coal, building stone of good quality, marble, cement, lime, and whatever is necessary for the building of a capital, irrespective of any private interests. If a territory of that kind can be found in the mother state, it should be accepted, and, when once a site is accepted, every care should be taken that every detail in the plan of the city is thoroughly investigated and gone into before any expenditure has been incurred.

From March to October 1902, Ferguson, wife, and a daughter went to England, and had also been present at the June/July/August coronation festivities associated with the new King Edward VII.

Ferguson's interest remained in state politics and he seldom attended the Senate due to old age and illness, even mooting in May of resigning his Senate seat at the end of 1903, led to his seat being declared vacant on 6 October 1903 for non-attendance, shortly before the 1903 federal election; but retained his state seat. The summary of his Senatorial life was that he was elected in his absence in 1901 but vacated his seat in 1903 for being absent without permission; becoming a senator would be a nice honour for a wealthy man, yet did not honour the role; and whilst said to be a white Australian, his few speeches were the opposite.

== Later life ==
Ferguson continued in the Legislative Council until his death in 1906, where his absences were noted.

In 1905 he and his wife again visited Great Britain.

Ferguson died at Winslow, Darling Point, Sydney, after a known long illness. Ferguson was buried in the Waverley Cemetery. Flags on public buildings flew at half-mast out of respect.

He was survived by his wife Eliza Frances Ferguson, five married daughters and his only son. His Queensland home of Rakeevan went to his widow and one daughter, his Mount Morgan shares to another daughter, and business shares to the third daughter. His wife died on 23 July 1923, and was equally charitable as her husband with her bequests.

== See also ==
- Central Queensland Territorial Separation League
- Kenmore House, Rockhampton

Parliament of Queensland
Preceded by William Rea	Member for Rockhampton; 1881–1888; Served alongside: Thomas Macdonald-Paterson, William Higson	Succeeded by Archibald Archer
