= William Higson =

Australian politician

William Kay Higson

Member of the Queensland Legislative Assembly for Rockhampton
- In office 17 August 1883 – 5 May 1888 Serving with John Ferguson
- Preceded by: Thomas Macdonald-Paterson
- Succeeded by: William Pattison

Personal details
- Born: William Kay Higson; February 1843 Giggleswick, Yorkshire, England
- Died: 22 March 1931 (aged 88) Rockhampton, Queensland, Australia
- Resting place: South Rockhampton Cemetery
- Spouse: Elizabeth Fryer Thrussell (m.1866 d.1925)
- Occupation: Merchant

William Kay Higson (1843–1931) was a politician in Queensland, Australia. He was a Member of the Queensland Legislative Assembly.

== Early life and education ==
The son of Thomas and Mary (née Kay) Higson, he was born in Giggleswick, Yorkshire, England and educated in Yorkshire.

== Pre-parliamentary career ==
In 1865 Higson set up a business as a fruiterer. He later became a produce and railway contract merchant before establishing himself as a general merchant until he retired 1914. Alderman Rockhampton.

== Political life ==
Higson was an alderman in the city of Rockhampton and represented Rockhampton in the Legislative Assembly from 1883–1888.

He was a member of the Committee of Rockhampton Jockey Club and raced several champion horses at Callaghan Park.

Parliament of Queensland
Preceded by Thomas Macdonald-Paterson	Member for Rockhampton; 1883–1888; Served alongside: John Ferguson	Succeeded by William Pattison
