= Central Queensland Today =

Weekly independent Australian newspaper

Central Queensland Today, branded as CQ Today, is a weekly independent Australian newspaper serving the city of Rockhampton and its surrounds in Central Queensland.

The newspaper was first mooted following News Corp Australia's decision in May 2020 to stop publishing the city's daily newspaper, The Morning Bulletin as a print edition, moving it to an entirely online format.

CQ Today was launched as a 72-page publication on 27 August 2020 with a cover price of $3. It had intended to be launched on 13 August 2020 but the first issue was delayed by two weeks.

At its launch, there was a team of seven Rockhampton-based employees working at CQ Today, consisting of three journalists, an account manager, an advertising manager, a sales and marketing executive and a general manager.

Owned by Pakenham-based Star News Group, CQ Today is published in Townsville.

With a strong focus on community-orientated good news stories, the newspaper also publishes regular opinion and lifestyle columns written by local Central Queensland personalities. Regular columns include "Current Affairs" with Matt Canavan and Robert Schwarten, "Styles of CQ" with Jacquie Mackay, "Gardening" with Neil Fisher, "Weather" with Mike Griffin, "Rural Matters" and "Fishing". The newspaper also has weekly letters to the editor, entertainment, real estate, classifieds and sport pages.

== See also ==
- The Morning Bulletin
