= Electoral district of Rockhampton =

Electoral district of Queensland, Australia

Rockhampton Queensland—Legislative Assembly
- Electoral map of Rockhampton 2017
- State: Queensland
- Dates current: 1865–1960; 1972–present
- MP: Donna Kirkland
- Party: Liberal National
- Namesake: Rockhampton
- Electors: 36,524 (2020)
- Area: 174 km^{2} (67.2 sq mi)
- Demographic: Provincial
- Coordinates: 23°24′S 150°28′E
Electorates around Rockhampton:
Mirani	Mirani	Keppel
Mirani	Rockhampton	Mirani
Mirani	Mirani	Mirani

Electoral district of Rockhampton, 1865

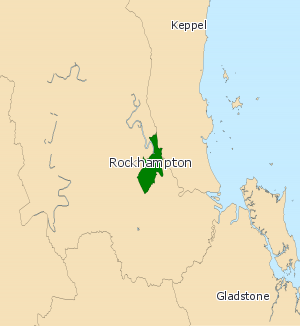
Electoral map of Rockhampton 2008

Rockhampton is an electoral district of the Legislative Assembly in the Australian state of Queensland.

Wedged between the electoral districts of Keppel to the east and Mirani to the west, Rockhampton encompasses the bulk of the regional city of Rockhampton and many of its outlying developed areas, including the community of Gracemere.

== History ==
In 1864, the Additional Members Act created six additional electoral districts, each returning 1 member:

- Clermont
- Kennedy
- Maryborough
- Mitchell
- Rockhampton
- Warrego

The first elections in these six electorates were held in 1865 (that is, during a parliamentary term and not as part of a general election across Queensland). The nomination date for the election in Rockhampton was 30 January 1865 and the election was held on 1 February 1865.

== Members for Rockhampton ==
First incarnation (1865–1960)
1865–1878, 1 member
Member	Term
Charles Fitzsimmons	1865–1867
Thomas Henry FitzGerald	1867
Archibald Archer	1867–1869
Henry Milford	1869–1870
Alexander Fyfe	1870–1873
Charles Hardie Buzacott	1873–1877
John MacFarlane	1877–1878

1878–1912, 2 members
Member	Party	Term	Member	Party	Term
William Rea		1878–1881	Thomas Macdonald-Paterson		1878–1883
John Ferguson	Griffith	1881–1888	William Higson	Griffith	1883–1888
Archibald Archer	Independent	1888–1896	William Pattison	Conservative	1888–1893
Archibald Archer	Independent	1888–1896	George Curtis	Independent	1893–1902
William Kidston	Labour	1896–1907	George Curtis	Independent	1893–1902
William Kidston	Labour	1896–1907	Kenneth Grant	Labour	1902–1907
William Kidston	Kidstonites	1907–1909	Kenneth Grant	Kidstonites	1907–1909
William Kidston	Liberal	1909–1911	Kenneth Grant	Liberal	1909–1912
John Adamson	Labour	1911–1912	Kenneth Grant	Liberal	1909–1912

1912–1960, 1 member
Member	Party	Term
John Adamson	Labor	1912–1916
John Adamson	Independent	1916–1917
Frank Forde	Labor	1917–1922
George Farrell	Labor	1923–1929
Thomas Dunlop	Independent	1929–1932
James Larcombe	Labor	1932–1956
Mick Gardner	Labor	1956–1957
Mick Gardner	Queensland Labor	1957–1960
Second incarnation (1972–present, 1 member)
Member	Party	Term
Keith Wright	Labor	1972–1984
Paul Braddy	Labor	1985–1995
Robert Schwarten	Labor	1995–2012
Bill Byrne	Labor	2012–2017
Barry O'Rourke	Labor	2017–2024
Donna Kirkland	Liberal National	2024–present

== Election results ==
2024 Queensland state election: Rockhampton
Party	Candidate	Votes	%	±%
Labor	Craig Marshall	9,774	30.20	−14.10
Liberal National	Donna Kirkland	9,243	28.55	+4.75
Independent	Margaret Strelow	5,780	17.86	+17.86
One Nation	David Bond	4,382	13.54	+1.14
Legalise Cannabis	Jacinta Waller	1,279	3.95	+0.05
Greens	Mick Jones	1,241	3.83	+0.43
Family First	Fredy Johnson	671	2.07	+2.07
Total formal votes		32,370	95.55	
Informal votes		1,506	4.45	
Turnout		33,876	87.01	
Two-party-preferred result
Liberal National	Donna Kirkland	16,772	51.81	+10.41
Labor	Craig Marshall	15,598	48.19	−10.41
Liberal National gain from Labor		Swing	+10.41	

Primary vote results in Rockhampton (Second Incarnation) (Parties that have never gotten 5% of the vote are omitted)
Labor
Liberal National

Country/National
Liberal

One Nation
Katter's Australian
City Country Alliance
Greens
Family First
Queensland Labor
Independent
View source data.
Two-candidate-preferred vote results in Rockhampton (Second Incarnation) View source data.
