= Bill Byrne (politician) =

Australian Labor politician

Minister for Agriculture and Fisheries
- In office 11 November 2016 – 7 October 2017
- Premier: Annastacia Palaszczuk
- Preceded by: Leanne Donaldson
- Succeeded by: Anthony Lynham
- In office 16 February 2015 – 7 December 2015
- Premier: Annastacia Palaszczuk
- Preceded by: John McVeigh
- Succeeded by: Leanne Donaldson

Minister for Rural Economic Development
- In office 11 November 2016 – 7 October 2017
- Premier: Annastacia Palaszczuk
- Preceded by: New ministry
- Succeeded by: Anthony Lynham

Minister for Police, Fire and Emergency Services Minister for Corrective Services
- In office 7 December 2015 – 11 November 2016
- Premier: Annastacia Palaszczuk
- Preceded by: Jo-Ann Miller
- Succeeded by: Mark Ryan

Minister for Sport and Racing
- In office 16 February 2015 – 7 December 2015
- Premier: Annastacia Palaszczuk
- Preceded by: Steve Dickson
- Succeeded by: Curtis Pitt (Sport); Grace Grace (Racing)

Shadow Minister for Sport and Recreation
- In office 4 March 2014 – 14 February 2015
- Leader: Annastacia Palaszczuk
- Preceded by: Curtis Pitt
- Succeeded by: Jann Stuckey

Shadow Minister for Police, Corrective Services and Emergency Services Shadow Minister for Construction and Public Works Shadow Minister for National Parks
- In office 19 April 2012 – 14 February 2015
- Leader: Annastacia Palaszczuk
- Preceded by: John-Paul Langbroek (Police); Ros Bates (Building Industry)
- Succeeded by: Jarrod Bleijie (Police); Rob Molhoek (Public Works); Stephen Bennett (National Parks)

Shadow Minister for Environment and Heritage Protection
- In office 19 April 2012 – 10 May 2012
- Leader: Annastacia Palaszczuk
- Preceded by: Andrew Powell
- Succeeded by: Jackie Trad

Member of the Queensland Parliament for Rockhampton
- In office 24 March 2012 – 25 November 2017
- Preceded by: Robert Schwarten
- Succeeded by: Barry O'Rourke

Personal details
- Born: William Stephen Byrne; 19 April 1958 (age 68) Bundaberg, Queensland
- Party: Labor
- Website: billbyrne.com.au

Military service
- Allegiance: Australia
- Branch/service: Australian Army (1980–1999); Australian Army Reserve (2000–present)
- Years of service: 1980–present
- Rank: Lieutenant colonel
- Unit: 3rd Battalion, Royal Australian Regiment

William Stephen Byrne (born 19 April 1958) is an Australian Labor politician who was elected to represent Rockhampton in the Legislative Assembly of Queensland at the 2012 state election. He served until his retirement due to ill health in 2017.

His party was heavily defeated at the 2012 election and Byrne was one of seven ALP members of the Legislative Assembly returned at that election.

Of the seven ALP members returned at the general election, Byrne was the only one new to the Legislative Assembly although Jackie Trad was soon elected in South Brisbane replacing former Premier Anna Bligh who resigned immediately after the election defeat.

After Labor's victory in the 2015 Queensland state election, he was sworn in as Minister for Agriculture and Fisheries and Minister for Sport and Racing in the Palaszczuk Ministry on 16 February 2015.

In December 2015, Byrne's portfolio in the Palaszczuk Ministry changed when he became the new Minister for Police, Fire and Emergency Services and the new Minister for Corrective Services. He regained the Agriculture and Fisheries portfolio and was given the new ministry of Regional Economic Development in a November 2016 reshuffle.

In February 2016, the state opposition called for an investigation into Byrne under firearms laws after he admitted to using a rifle to shoot rats at his home twenty years earlier.

On 7 October 2017, Byrne announced that he had resigned from the Queensland Cabinet as Minister for Agriculture and Fisheries and Minister for Rural Economic Development, and that he would not be contesting the next election. He cited a serious and "life threatening" health issue as the reason for his retirement.

Parliament of Queensland
Preceded by Robert Schwarten	Member for Rockhampton; 2012–2017	Succeeded by Barry O'Rourke
Political offices
Preceded by John McVeigh	Minister for Agriculture and Fisheries; 2015	Succeeded by Leanne Donaldson
Preceded by Steve Dickson	Minister for Sport and Racing; 2015	Succeeded by Curtis Pitt as Minister for Sport
Preceded by Steve Dickson	Minister for Sport and Racing; 2015	Succeeded by Grace Grace as Minister for Racing
Preceded by Jo-Ann Miller	Minister for Police, Fire and Emergency Services; 2015–2016	Succeeded by Mark Ryan
Preceded by Jo-Ann Miller	Minister for Corrections; 2015–2016	Succeeded by Mark Ryan
Preceded by Leanne Donaldson	Minister for Agriculture and Fisheries; 2016–2017	Succeeded by Anthony Lynham
New title	Minister for Rural Economic Development; 2016–2017	Succeeded by Anthony Lynham
