= Barry O'Rourke =

Australian politician in Queensland

Barry O'Rourke MP
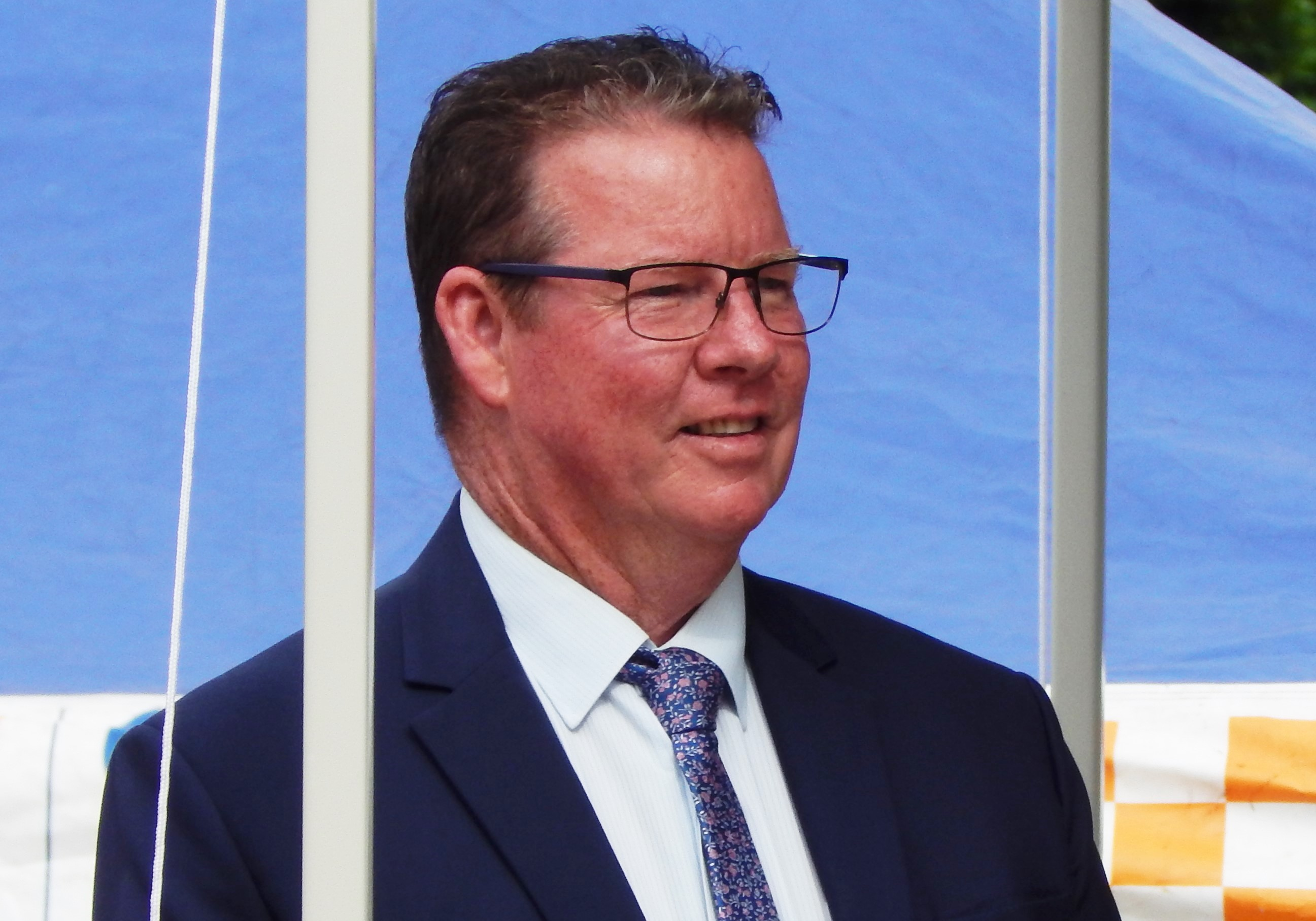
- Barry O'Rourke, 2022

Member of the Queensland Legislative Assembly for Rockhampton
- In office 25 November 2017 – 26 October 2024
- Preceded by: Bill Byrne
- Succeeded by: Donna Kirkland

Personal details
- Born: 17 November 1963 (age 62) Ayr, Queensland
- Party: Labor
- Website: www.barryorourke.com

Barry Leonard O'Rourke (born 17 November 1963) is an Australian politician. He served as the Labor member for Rockhampton in the Queensland Legislative Assembly from 2017 until his retirement in 2024.

== Career ==
Following the unexpected retirement of Labor MP Bill Byrne for health reasons, O'Rourke contested Labor preselection for Byrne's seat of Rockhampton. His main opponent was Margaret Strelow, the mayor of Rockhampton, who was endorsed by the Premier, Annastacia Palaszczuk. On 27 October 2017, O'Rourke defeated Strelow, who subsequently announced she would contest the election as an independent.

At the November state election, O'Rourke was elected to succeed Byrne as the member for Rockhampton. Strelow recorded 23.5% of the vote and was second on the initial count, but Liberal National preferences pushed the One Nation candidate ahead of her and O'Rourke was elected on Strelow's preferences.

On 13 November 2023, O'Rourke announced his intention to retire from politics at the 2024 election, citing health issues.

On 15 July 2024, During his weekly spot on local radio station 4RO, O'Rourke revealed he used the electoral roll to obtain addresses of people who leave negative comments on his Facebook page so he can visit them in person, which prompted accusations of intimidation from federal LNP MP Michelle Landry and One Nation's James Ashby. However, Premier Steven Miles defended O'Rourke, describing it as "an entirely appropriate use of the electoral roll."

Parliament of Queensland
| Preceded by Bill Byrne | Member for Rockhampton; 2017–2024 | Succeeded by Donna Kirkland |
