= Margaret Strelow =

Australian politician

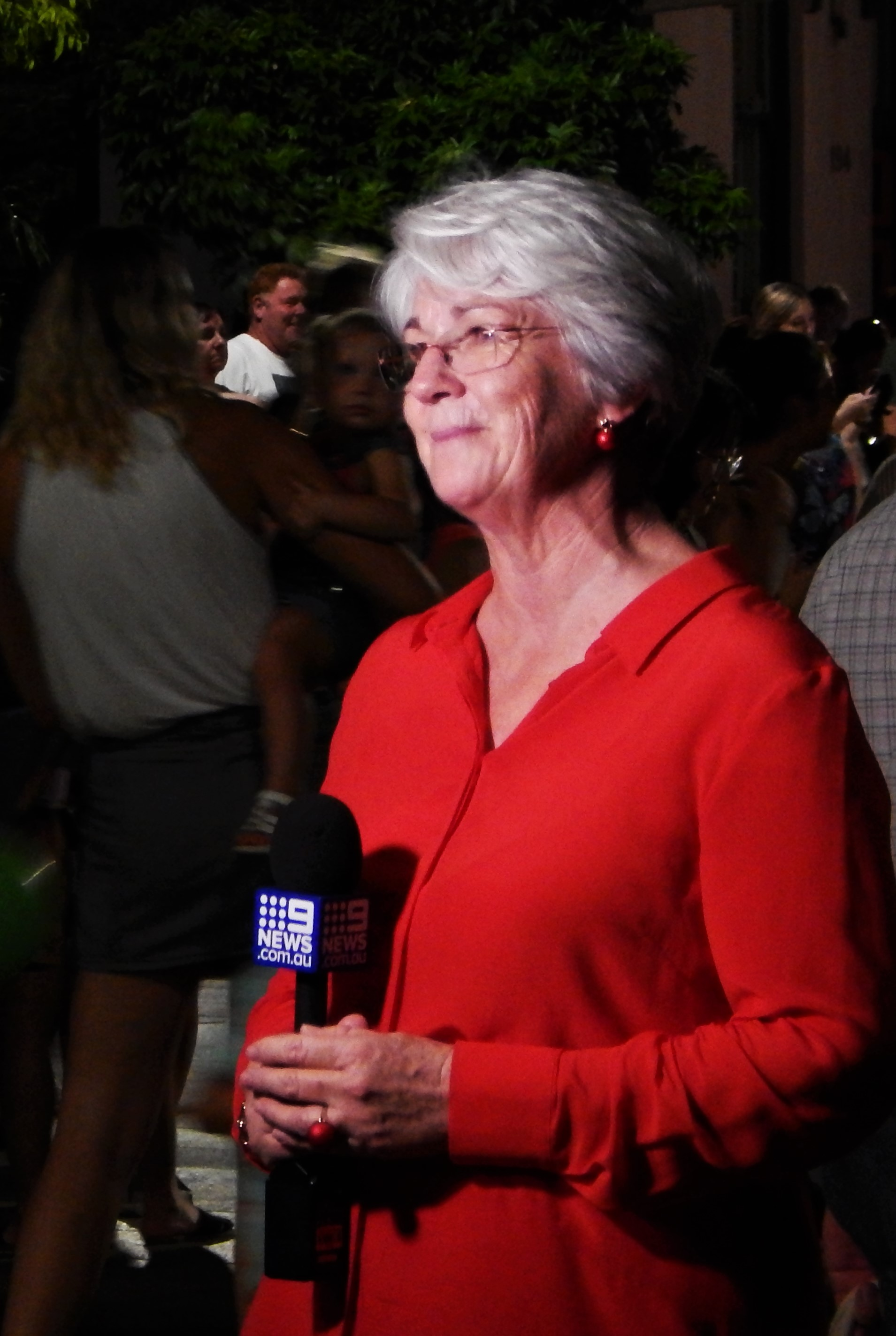

Mayor of Rockhampton Region
- In office 28 April 2012 – 9 November 2020
- Preceded by: Brad Carter
- Succeeded by: Tony Williams

Mayor of the City of Rockhampton
- In office 15 April 2000 – 15 March 2008
- Preceded by: Jim McRae
- Succeeded by: Brad Carter (Rockhampton Region)

Personal details
- Party: Independent (2017–present)
- Other political affiliations: Labor (1997–2017)
- Education: University of South Australia; University of New England; Central Queensland University
- Awards: Centenary Medal (2001)

Margaret Fay Strelow is an Australian politician who served as the mayor of the Rockhampton Region from April 2012 to November 2020.

Prior to her election as mayor of the newly amalgamated Rockhampton Region, Strelow served as a councillor for the City of Rockhampton from 1997 to 2000, and as Mayor of the City of Rockhampton from 2000 to 2008.

Following the announcement that incumbent Labor MP Bill Byrne would be retiring ahead of the 2017 state election, Strelow nominated to become their candidate for the seat of Rockhampton, however Barry O'Rourke was preselected instead. She then ran for the seat as an independent and came second on primary votes, but she was ultimately excluded from the two-candidate preferred result because the preferences of LNP voters favoured the One Nation candidate.

She resigned from her position as Mayor of the Rockhampton Region on the 9th November 2020 as a result of findings of misconduct against her by the Councillor Conduct Tribunal. In 2024, Strelow was exonerated as a review by QCAT found that the official hospitality was not required to have been listed on the particular register in question. It also commented that it was "clearly highly regrettable that this matter has taken so long to be dealt with".

Strelow again ran as an independent candidate for Rockhampton at the 2024 Queensland state election but did not win, coming third on primary votes.
