= Electoral results for the district of Braidwood =

Election result for Braidwood, New South Wales, Australia

Braidwood, an electoral district of the Legislative Assembly in the Australian state of New South Wales was created in 1859 and abolished in 1904.

Election	Member	Party
1859	Frederick Cooper	None
1860 by	Merion Moriarty	None
1860	Merion Moriarty	None
1864 by	Henry Milford	None
1864–65	Joshua Josephson	None
1869 by	Michael Kelly	None
1869–70	Michael Kelly	None
1870 by	Edward Greville	None
1872	Edward Greville	None
1874–75	Edward Greville	None
1877	Edward Greville	None
1880	Alexander Ryrie	None
1882	Alexander Ryrie	None
1885	Alexander Ryrie	None
1887	Alexander Ryrie	Protectionist
1889	Alexander Ryrie	Protectionist
1891	Austin Chapman	Protectionist
1894	Austin Chapman	Protectionist
1895	Austin Chapman	Protectionist
1898	Austin Chapman	Protectionist
1901	Albert Chapman	Progressive

== Election results ==
=== Elections in the 1900s ===
==== 1901 ====
1901 New South Wales state election: Braidwood
Party	Candidate	Votes	%	±%
Progressive	Albert Chapman	640	43.2	−29.9
Independent Liberal	Richard Higgins	483	32.6	
Independent Liberal	Patrick O'Brien	223	15.0	
Independent Liberal	Frederick Gordon	70	4.7	
Independent Liberal	Ebenezer Henry	46	3.1	
Independent Liberal	Alexander Fraser	15	1.0	
Independent	Walter Horberry	3	0.2	
Independent	Bartholomew O'Sullivan	2	0.1	
Ind. Progressive	John Kenny	1	0.07	
Total formal votes		1,483	95.6	−3.5
Informal votes		69	4.5	+3.5
Turnout		1,552	71.1	+18.7
Progressive hold				

=== Elections in the 1890s ===
==== 1898 ====
1898 New South Wales colonial election: Braidwood
Party	Candidate	Votes	%	±%
National Federal	Austin Chapman	833	73.1	
Free Trade	Charles Beale	307	26.9	
Total formal votes		1,140	99.0	
Informal votes		12	1.0	
Turnout		1,152	52.4	
National Federal hold				

==== 1895 ====
1895 New South Wales colonial election: Braidwood
Party	Candidate	Votes	%	±%
Protectionist	Austin Chapman	887	74.7	
Ind. Free Trade	Adolph Shadler	300	25.3	
Total formal votes		1,187	99.6	
Informal votes		5	0.4	
Turnout		1,192	56.5	
Protectionist hold				

==== 1894 ====
1894 New South Wales colonial election: Braidwood
Party	Candidate	Votes	%	±%
Protectionist	Austin Chapman	1,192	78.8	
Ind. Free Trade	Alfred Hitchens	279	18.4	
Free Trade	Adolph Shadler	42	2.8	
Total formal votes		1,513	98.9	
Informal votes		17	1.1	
Turnout		1,530	79.0	
Protectionist hold				

==== 1891 ====
1891 New South Wales colonial election: Braidwood Wednesday 24 June
Party	Candidate	Votes	%	±%
Protectionist	Austin Chapman (elected)	586	60.0	
Free Trade	George Tompsitt	230	23.6	
Protectionist	Alexander Ryrie	160	16.4	
Total formal votes		976	97.8	
Informal votes		22	2.2	
Turnout		998	53.4	
Protectionist hold				

=== Elections in the 1880s ===
==== 1889 ====
1889 New South Wales colonial election: Braidwood Monday 4 February
Party	Candidate	Votes	%	±%
Protectionist	Alexander Ryrie (re-elected)	586	56.8	
Free Trade	John Lingen	446	43.2	
Total formal votes		1,032	97.7	
Informal votes		24	2.3	
Turnout		1,056	65.6	
Protectionist hold				

==== 1887 ====
1887 New South Wales colonial election: Braidwood Monday 14 February
Party	Candidate	Votes	%	±%
Protectionist	Alexander Ryrie (re-elected)	535	58.3	
Free Trade	John Lingen	383	41.7	
Total formal votes		918	97.6	
Informal votes		23	2.4	
Turnout		939	62.6	

==== 1885 ====
1885 New South Wales colonial election: Braidwood Friday 23 October
Candidate	Votes	%
Alexander Ryrie (re-elected)	453	54.1
Angus Cameron	385	45.9
Total formal votes	838	97.2
Informal votes	24	2.8
Turnout	862	60.4

Angus Cameron was a sitting member for West Sydney however he had been defeated for that seat on Tuesday 13 October.

==== 1882 ====
1882 New South Wales colonial election: Braidwood Saturday 9 December
Candidate	Votes	%
Alexander Ryrie (re-elected)	unopposed	

==== 1880 ====
1880 New South Wales colonial election: Braidwood Monday 29 November
Candidate	Votes	%
Alexander Ryrie (elected)	609	55.4
Edward Greville (defeated)	491	44.6
Total formal votes	1,100	95.9
Informal votes	47	4.1
Turnout	1,147	73.3

=== Elections in the 1870s ===
==== 1877 ====
1877 New South Wales colonial election: Braidwood Wednesday 31 October
Candidate	Votes	%
Edward Greville (re-elected)	unopposed	

==== 1874–75 ====
1874–75 New South Wales colonial election: Braidwood Monday 28 December 1874
Candidate	Votes	%
Edward Greville (re-elected)	unopposed	

==== 1872 ====
1872 New South Wales colonial election: Braidwood Tuesday 5 March
Candidate	Votes	%
Edward Greville (re-elected)	1,017	67.3
George Alley	485	32.1
Archibald Condon	10	0.7
Total formal votes	1,512	96.0
Informal votes	63	4.0
Turnout	1,662	57.4

==== 1870 by-election ====
1870 Braidwood by-election
Candidate	Votes	%
Edward Greville (elected)	1,065	51.4
Michael Kelly (defeated)	1,006	48.6
Total formal votes	2,071	98.2
Informal votes	37	1.8
Turnout	2,108	69.4

The December 1869 Braidwood election was declared to be void.

=== Elections in the 1860s ===
==== 1869–70 ====
1869–70 New South Wales colonial election: Braidwood Tuesday 14 December 1869
Candidate	Votes	%
Michael Kelly (re-elected)	872	54.8
Edward Greville	625	39.3
George Alley	94	5.9
Total formal votes	1,591	100.0
Informal votes	0	0.0
Turnout	1,648	59.6

==== 1869 by-election ====
1869 Braidwood by-election Monday 20 September
Candidate	Votes	%
Michael Kelly (elected)	unopposed	

Joshua Josephson resigned to accept an appointment as a judge of the District Court.

==== 1864–65 ====
1864–65 New South Wales colonial election: Braidwood Tuesday 13 December 1864
Candidate	Votes	%
Joshua Josephson (elected)	640	50.3
Michael O'Haire	632	49.7
Total formal votes	1,272	97.0
Informal votes	40	3.1
Turnout	1,311	44.8

==== 1864 by-election ====
1864 Braidwood by-election Wednesday, 3 February
Candidate	Votes	%
Henry Milford (elected)	448	50.5
Henry Parkes	439	49.5
Total formal votes	887	100.0
Informal votes	0	0.0
Turnout	887	49.4

Merion Moriarty died.

==== 1860 ====
1860 New South Wales colonial election: Braidwood Monday 10 December
Candidate	Votes	%
Merion Moriarty (re-elected)	unopposed	

==== 1860 by-election ====
1860 Braidwood by-election Friday 10 August
Candidate	Votes	%
Merion Moriarty (elected)	184	52.9
James Larmer	159	45.7
Stephen Richardson	3	45.7
Henry Milford	1	0.3
Joseph Taylor	1	0.3
Total formal votes	348	100.0
Informal votes	0	0.0
Turnout	348	26.7

Frederick Cooper resigned.

=== Elections in the 1850s ===
==== 1859 ====
1859 New South Wales colonial election: Braidwood Monday 20 June
Candidate	Votes	%
Frederick Cooper (elected)	223	67.2
Merion Moriarty	47	14.2
George Simpson	37	11.1
Stephen Richardson	25	7.5
Total formal votes	332	94.3
Informal votes	20	5.7
Turnout	352	69.0
