= Members of the Queensland Legislative Assembly, 1883–1888 =

This is a list of members of the 9th Legislative Assembly of Queensland from 1883 to 1888, as elected at the 1883 colonial elections held between 10 August 1883 and 30 October 1883 (due to problems of distance and communications, it was not possible to hold the elections on a single day).

Name	Party	Electorate	Term in office
Walter Adams^{[11]}	Ministerial	Mulgrave	1886–1892
Robert Aland	Opposition	Drayton and Toowoomba	1881–1893
William Allan^{[14]}	Opposition	Darling Downs	1881–1883; 1887–1896
John Annear^{[4]}	Ministerial	Maryborough	1884–1902
Archibald Archer^{[9]}	Independent	Blackall	1867–1869; 1878–1886; 1888–1896
William Bailey	Ministerial	Wide Bay	1873–1888
John Lloyd Bale^{[7]}	Ministerial	Enoggera	1883–1885
Frank Beattie^{[10]}	Ministerial	Fortitude Valley	1874–1878; 1879–1886
Maurice Hume Black	Opposition	Mackay	1881–1893
William Brookes	Ministerial	North Brisbane	1863–1867; 1882–1888
Samuel Brooks^{[10]}	Ministerial	Fortitude Valley	1886–1888
William Villiers Brown^{[8]}	Independent	Townsville	1885–1888; 1891–1893
John Buckland	Ministerial	Bulimba	1882–1892
Robert Bulcock^{[7]}	Ministerial	Enoggera	1885–1888
James Campbell^{[2]}	Opposition	Aubigny	1884–1893
Thomas Campbell^{[3]}^{[6]}	Independent	Cook	1884–1885
Charles Chubb	Opposition	Bowen	1883–1888
Frederick Cooper^{[3]}	Independent	Cook	1878–1884
James Crombie	Opposition	Mitchell	1888–1898
James Dickson	Ministerial/Independent	Enoggera	1873–1888; 1892–1901
John Donaldson	Opposition	Warrego	1883–1893; 1896
Hon. Charles Dutton^{[1]}	Ministerial	Leichhardt	1883–1888
John Ferguson	Ministerial	Rockhampton	1881–1888
James Foote	Ministerial	Bundamba	1873–1878; 1880–1888; 1892–1893
Justin Foxton	Ministerial	Carnarvon	1883–1904
Simon Fraser	Ministerial	South Brisbane	1868–1870; 1873–1878; 1880–1888
James Garrick^{[1]}	Ministerial	Moreton	1867–1868; 1877–1883
John Govett	Opposition	Mitchell	1882–1888
Samuel Griffith	Ministerial	North Brisbane	1872–1893
Samuel Grimes	Ministerial	Oxley	1878–1902
William Henry Groom	Ministerial	Drayton and Toowoomba	1862–1901
John Hamilton	Opposition	Cook	1878–1904
William Higson	Ministerial	Rockhampton	1883–1888
Charles Lumley Hill^{[6]}	Independent	Cook	1878–1882, 1885–1888
Jacob Horwitz^{[12]}	Ministerial	Warwick	1878–1887
John Hurley^{[4]}	Independent	Maryborough	1883–1884
Jean-Baptiste Isambert	Ministerial	Rosewood	1882–1892
John Jessop	Opposition	Dalby	1882–1893
Henry Jordan	Ministerial	South Brisbane	1860; 1868–1871; 1883–1890
Francis Kates	Ministerial	Darling Downs	1878–1881; 1883–1888
William Kellett	Ministerial	Stanley	1878–1888
James Lalor	Opposition	Maranoa	1878–1888
Isidor Lissner	Opposition	Kennedy	1883–1893; 1896–1899
Thomas MacDonald-Paterson^{[1]}^{[5]}	Ministerial	Moreton	1878–1885; 1896–1901
John MacFarlane	Ministerial	Ipswich	1878–1894
Thomas McIlwraith^{[11]}	Opposition	Mulgrave	1870–1871; 1873–1886; 1888–1896
John McMaster^{[8]}	Ministerial	Fortitude Valley	1885–1899; 1901–1904; 1907–1908
Thomas McWhannell^{[15]}	Ministerial	Gregory	1882–1888
John Murtagh Macrossan	Opposition	Townsville	1873–1878; 1879–1891
Matthew Mellor	Ministerial	Wide Bay	1883–1893
Alfred Midgley^{[13]}	Independent	Fassifern	1883–1887
William Miles^{[14]}	Ministerial	Darling Downs	1864–1873; 1874–1875; 1876–1887
Boyd Dunlop Morehead	Opposition	Balonne	1871–1880; 1883–1896
Berkeley Basil Moreton	Ministerial	Burnett	1870–1871; 1873–1875; 1883–1888
Arthur Morgan^{[12]}	Independent	Warwick	1887–1896; 1898–1906
Frank Reid Murphy^{[8]}	Opposition	Barcoo	1885–1892
Hugh Nelson	Opposition	Northern Downs	1883–1898
Albert Norton	Opposition	Port Curtis	1878–1893
Edward Palmer	Opposition	Burke	1883–1893
William Pattison^{[9]}	Opposition	Blackall	1886–1893
Patrick Perkins^{[2]}	Opposition	Aubigny	1877–1884; 1888–1893
Robert Philp^{[8]}	Opposition	Musgrave	1886–1915
Arthur Rutledge	Ministerial	Kennedy	1878–1893; 1899–1904
William Salkeld	Ministerial	Ipswich	1883–1893
John Scott	Opposition	Leichhardt	1868, 1870–1888
Richard Bingham Sheridan	Ministerial	Maryborough	1883–1888
William Smyth	Ministerial	Gympie	1883–1899
Ernest James Stevens	Independent	Logan	1878–1896
John Stevenson	Ministerial	Normanby	1876–1893
George Thorn^{[13]}	Independent	Fassifern	1867–1874; 1876–1878; 1879–1883; 1887–1888; 1893–1902
Hiram Wakefield^{[5]}	Ministerial	Moreton	1885–1888
Donald Smith Wallace	Ministerial	Clermont	1883–1888
Peter White	Independent	Stanley	1883–1888

== See also ==
- Premier:

Samuel Griffith (Ministerial) (1883–1888)

== Notes ==
^{1} The First Griffith Ministry was constituted on 13 November 1883. As a result, all new ministers had to resign their seats and contest them at ministerial by-elections; all except Charles Dutton, member for Leichhardt, were unopposed. Additionally, on the same day, James Garrick, the member for Moreton, was appointed to the Queensland Legislative Council. Thomas MacDonald-Paterson, who had lost his seat of Rockhampton at the election three months earlier, was elected unopposed for Moreton on 21 November 1883, whilst Dutton was re-elected on 7 December.
^{2} Following a petition alleging electoral fraud by Patrick Perkins or his supporters, on 21 February 1884, the Committee of Elections and Qualifications ruled the election of Patrick Perkins, the member for Aubigny, null and void. James Campbell was elected unopposed at the resulting by-election on 4 March 1884; although Perkins was able to contest the by-election, he decided not to do so.
^{3} On 4 March 1884, the Committee of Elections and Qualifications ruled Frederick Cooper, one of the members for Cook, was disqualified from sitting in the Legislative Assembly. Thomas Campbell, one of the unsuccessful candidates at the 1883 poll, was declared elected. The Brisbane Courier editorial on 27 February, anticipating a new election being called in Cook, said: "There was so much personation on both sides that a new election would be desirable, if it could be assumed that it would be conducted more free from abuse than its predecessor."
^{4} On 8 July 1884, John Hurley, the member for Maryborough, resigned after having been declared insolvent. John Annear won the resulting by-election on 25 July 1884.
^{5} On 22 April 1885, Thomas MacDonald-Paterson, the member for Moreton, was appointed to the Queensland Legislative Council. Hiram Wakefield won the resulting by-election on 13 May 1885.
^{6} On 4 August 1885, Thomas Campbell, the member for Cook, resigned after having been declared insolvent. Charles Lumley Hill won the resulting by-election on 16 September 1885.
^{7} On 13 October 1885, John Lloyd Bale, the member for Enoggera, resigned due to ill health. Robert Bulcock was elected unopposed at the resulting by-election on 26 October 1885.
^{8} The Additional Members Act 1885 created three new seats: Barcoo, Musgrave and an additional seat each in Townsville and Fortitude Valley. The following members were elected:
- Fortitude Valley (14 September 1885): John McMaster
- Townsville (11 November 1885): William Villiers Brown
- Barcoo (24 November 1885): Frank Reid Murphy
- Musgrave (5 January 1886): Robert Philp
^{9} On 23 January 1886, Archibald Archer, the member for Blackall, left for Europe on a prolonged visit, and resigned his seat. William Pattison won the resulting by-election on 13 April 1886.
^{10} On 16 April 1886, Frank Beattie, one of the members for Fortitude Valley, died. Samuel Brooks won the resulting by-election on 1 May 1886.
^{11} On 5 June 1886, Thomas McIlwraith, the member for Mulgrave, resigned. Walter Adams won the resulting by-election on 10 July 1886.
^{12} On 2 July 1887, Jacob Horwitz, the member for Warwick, resigned. Arthur Morgan was returned unopposed. won the resulting by-election on 18 July 1887.
^{13} On 19 July 1887, Alfred Midgley, the member for Fassifern, resigned. George Thorn, Jr. won the resulting by-election on 4 August 1887.
^{14} On 22 August 1887, William Miles, the member for Darling Downs, died. William Allan won the resulting by-election on 6 September 1887.
^{15} On 17 March 1888, Thomas McWhannell, the member for Gregory, died. No by-election was held due to the proximity of the 1888 election.
