= 1870 Braidwood colonial by-election =

By-election in New South Wales, Australia

A by-election was held for the New South Wales Legislative Assembly electorate of Braidwood on 17 October 1870 because the elections and qualifications committee declared the election of Michael Kelly to be void.

== Dates ==
Date	Event
14 December 1869	Braidwood election
14 February 1870	Petition against the election of Michael Kelly because of intimidation at a polling booth at Araluen.
11 August 1870	Committee of elections and qualifications appointed
21 September 1870	Committee of elections and qualifications declared the election was void.
21 September 1870	Writ of election issued by the Speaker of the Legislative Assembly and close of electoral rolls.
10 October 1870	Nominations
17 October 1870	Polling day
1 November 1870	Return of writ

== Results ==
1870 Braidwood by-election
Candidate	Votes	%
Edward Greville (elected)	1,065	51.4
Michael Kelly (defeated)	1,006	48.6
Total formal votes	2,071	98.2
Informal votes	37	1.8
Turnout	2,108	69.4

== See also ==
- Electoral results for the district of Braidwood
- List of New South Wales state by-elections
