= 1869 Braidwood colonial by-election =

By-election in New South Wales, Australia

A by-election was held for the New South Wales Legislative Assembly electorate of Braidwood on 20 September 1869 because of the resignation of Joshua Josephson to accept an appointment as a judge of the District Court.

== Dates ==
Date	Event
3 September 1869	Joshua Josephson resigned.
7 September 1869	Writ of election issued by the Speaker of the Legislative Assembly.
20 September 1869	Nominations
25 September 1869	Polling day
5 October 1869	Return of writ

== Results ==
1869 Braidwood by-election Monday 20 September
Candidate	Votes	%
Michael Kelly (elected)	unopposed	

== See also ==
- Electoral results for the district of Braidwood
- List of New South Wales state by-elections
