= 1864 Braidwood colonial by-election =

Election result for Braidwood, New South Wales, Australia

A by-election was held for the New South Wales Legislative Assembly electorate of Braidwood on 3 February 1864 because of the death of Merion Moriarty.

== Dates ==
Date	Event
10 January 1864	Merion Moriarty died.
14 January 1864	Writ of election issued by the Speaker of the Legislative Assembly and close of electoral rolls.
28 January 1864	Nominations
3 February 1864	Polling day
13 February 1864	Return of writ

== Results ==
1864 Braidwood by-election Wednesday, 3 February
Candidate	Votes	%
Henry Milford (elected)	448	50.5
Henry Parkes	439	49.5
Total formal votes	887	100.0
Informal votes	0	0.0
Turnout	887	49.4

== See also ==
- Electoral results for the district of Braidwood
- List of New South Wales state by-elections
