= Charles Lumley Hill =

Australian politician

Charles Hill
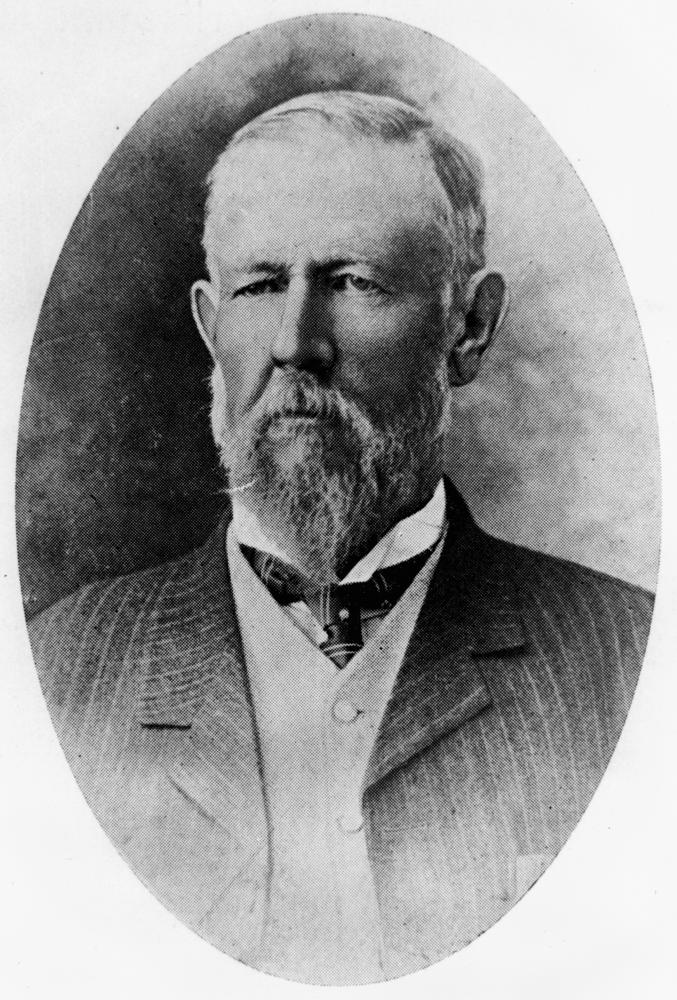

Member of the Queensland Legislative Assembly for Gregory
- In office 14 November 1878 – 20 February 1882
- Preceded by: New seat
- Succeeded by: Thomas McWhannell

Member of the Queensland Legislative Assembly for Cook
- In office 16 September 1885 – 26 May 1888 Serving with John Hamilton
- Preceded by: Thomas Campbell
- Succeeded by: Seat abolished

Personal details
- Born: Charles Lumley Hill; 1840 Tickhill Castle, Yorkshire, England
- Died: 28 October 1909 (aged 68–69) Esk, Queensland, Australia
- Resting place: Toowong Cemetery
- Spouse: Edith Maud Taylor (née Harris ) (m.1901 d.1925)
- Relations: George Harris (father-in-law)
- Education: Pembroke College, Oxford
- Occupation: Grazier, Cattle breeding, Station manager

Charles Lumley Hill (1840 – 28 October 1909) was a pastoralist, businessman and politician in Queensland, Australia. He was a Member of the Queensland Legislative Assembly.

== Early life ==
Hill was born in 1840 at Tickhill Castle, Yorkshire, England, the son of Colonel Charles John Hill and his wife Lady Frances Charlotte Arabella (née Lumley), sister of Richard Lumley, 9th Earl of Scarbrough. He was educated at Rossall School and Oxford University.

== Pastoralist in Australia ==
He moved to Australia in 1863 and became a manager on a cattle station in the Barcoo River region in the British colony of Queensland the following year. He established the Isis Downs Station soon after. He undertook several punitive expeditions against local Aboriginal people in the region after the killing of fellow Barcoo pastoralists John Fanning and Richard Welford, and was also involved in suppressing cattle stealing activities in the area. In the 1880s he sent cattle to the newly established Ord River pastoralist properties and part-owned the Lissadell Station there.

== Politics ==
Hill was elected to the Queensland Legislative Assembly in the electoral district of Gregory on 14 November 1878 at the 1878 colonial election. He resigned from the seat on 20 February 1882, having delayed until a suitable successor (Thomas McWhannell) was found. Thomas McWhannell won the resulting by-election on 21 March 1882.

In the 1883 election, Lumley Hill contested Cook (then a 2-member electorate) but was unsuccessful, being defeated by Frederick Cooper and John Hamilton. However, allegations of "ballot stuffing" surfaced, alleging there were too many votes cast at the California Creek polling station given the number of electors and the unsuccessful candidates, Hill and Thomas Campbell petitioned to overturn the ballot. In December 1883, arrests were made in connection with the ballot stuffing. On 4 March 1884, the Elections and Qualifications Committee determined that Frederick Cooper should not be elected and that Thomas Campbell should be elected instead. On 4 August 1885, Thomas Campbell resigned after having been declared insolvent. Hill won the resulting by-election on 16 September 1885.

Hill held Cook until 26 May 1888 when he did not contest Cook in the 1888 election as he had announced his retirement from politics. However, he then decided to contest the election in Port Curtis, but was unsuccessful.

Hill contested Stanley in the 1902 election but was not successful.

== Later life ==
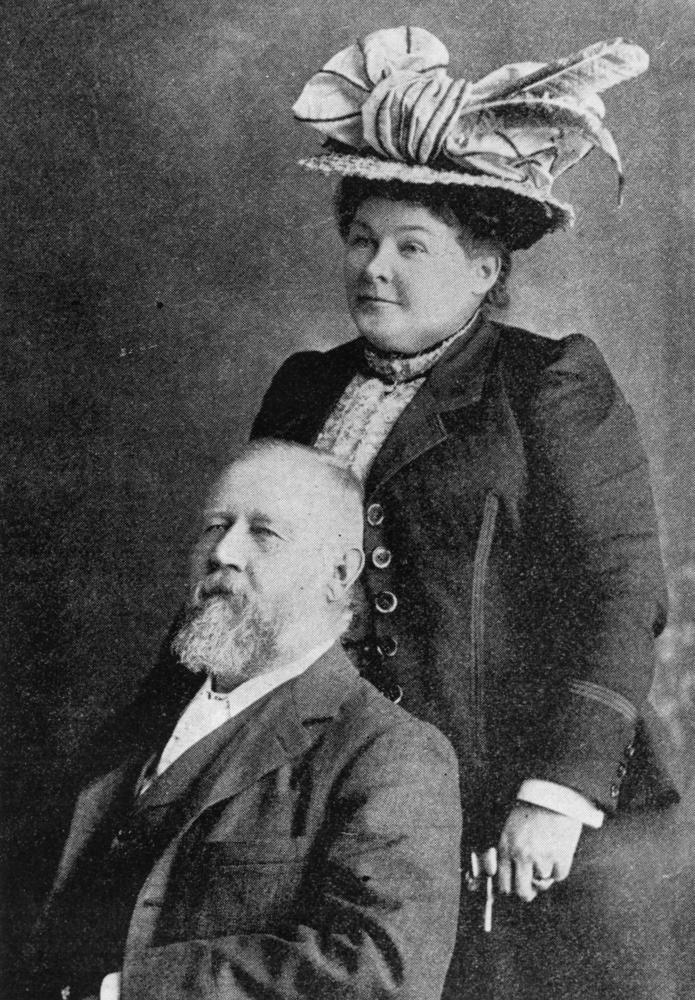
Lumley Hill and wife Edith Maud, August 1901

On 24 July 1901, Hill married Edith Maud Taylor (née Harris), the widow of George Condamine Taylor at All Saints Anglican Church in Wickham Terrace, Brisbane. His wife was very well-connected politically, being the daughter of George Harris (a Member of the Queensland Legislative Council), the niece of George Thorn (a Queensland Premier) and the sister-in-law of Richard Gardiner Casey (a Member of the Queensland Legislative Assembly). She inherited the Bellevue Homestead near Esk from her first husband.

Hill died on 28 October 1909 at the Bellevue Homestead after a short illness. His body was brought by train to Roma Street railway station from where his funeral left for the Toowong Cemetery on 29 October 1909.

== See also ==
- Members of the Queensland Legislative Assembly, 1878–1883; 1883–1888

Parliament of Queensland
New seat	Member for Gregory; 1878–1882	Succeeded by Thomas McWhannell
Preceded by Thomas Campbell	Member for Cook; 1885–1888; Served alongside: John Hamilton	Abolished
