= Francis Beattie =

Francis Beattie may refer to:

- Francis Beattie (British politician) (1885–1945), British politician
- Francis Beattie (Queensland politician) (1829–1886), Australian politician in Queensland
