= Bellevue Homestead =

Historic homestead in Coominya, Queensland, Australia

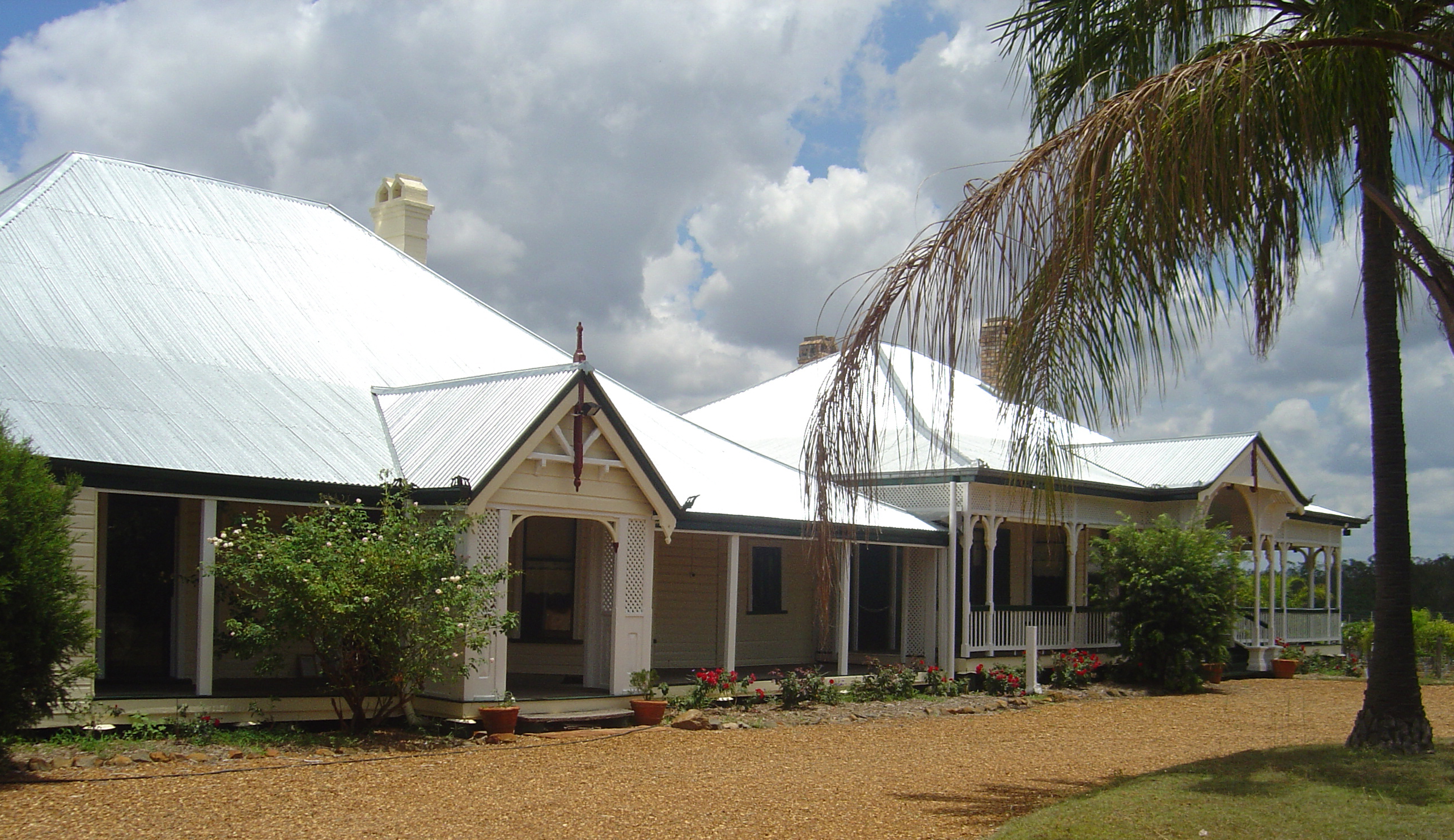
- Bellevue Homestead, 2007

- Location within Queensland
- 27.3889°S 152.5039°E
- Location: Bellvue Homestead, Coominya, Somerset Region, Queensland, Australia

History
- Design period: 1870s–1890s (late 19th century)
- Built: c. 1872–c. 1910

Queensland Heritage Register
- Official name: Bellevue Homestead
- Type: state heritage (built, landscape)
- Designated: 21 October 1992
- Reference no.: 600492
- Significant period: 1870s–1910s (historical); 1870s–1900s (fabric)
- Significant components: residential accommodation – main house, decorative features, shed/s, kitchen/kitchen house, stables, gate – entrance, garden/grounds, gate – jump, residential accommodation – caretaker's quarters

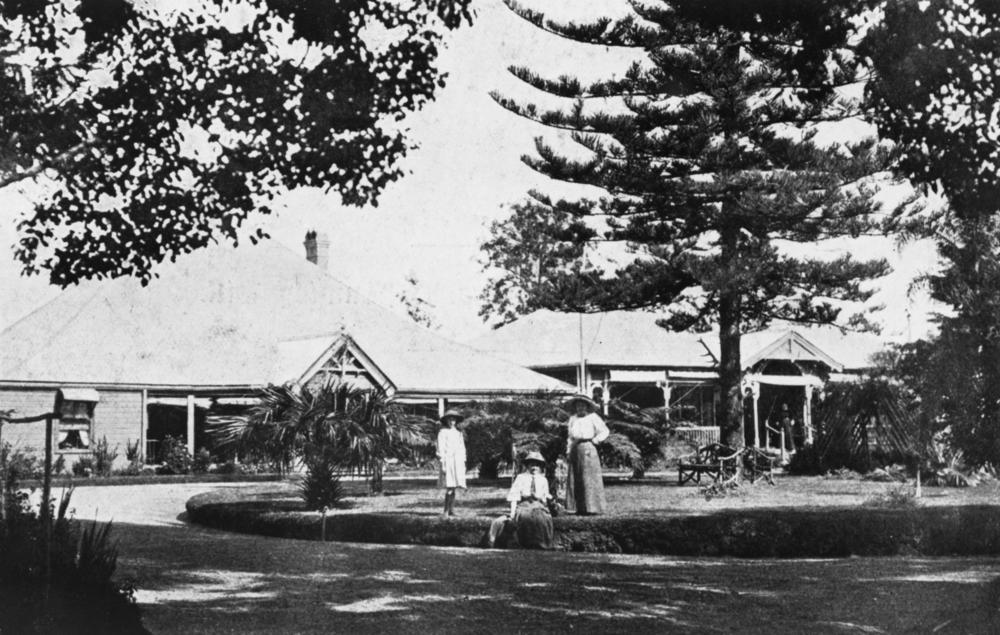
Homestead around 1914

Bellevue Homestead is a heritage-listed homestead currently located in Coominya, Somerset Region, Queensland, Australia. It was built from c. 1872 to c. 1910. It was added to the Queensland Heritage Register on 21 October 1992.

The Bellevue property was the western part of the original Wivenhoe Run established in the 1840s which covered 38,000 acres (150 km^{2}) on the western side of the Brisbane River valley. A large portion of this land is now part of the Wivenhoe Dam. The homestead was restored by the National Trust of Queensland between 1975 and 1980 after moving the buildings from the banks of the Brisbane River to the nearby town of Coominya to avoid being flooded.

== History ==
=== 19th century ===
In 1848, John Stephen Ferriter and Edmund Blucher Uhr squatted on 38,000 acres (150 km^{2}) close to limits of convict colony of Moreton Bay and called it Wivenhoe Run after the town in England. They grazed sheep and built two single roomed huts. The eastern hut was called Wivenhoe Homestead and the western slab hut was called Bellevue Homestead. The following year Wivenhoe lease registered in New South Wales Government Gazette. A lease was purchased by Major William North Senior and son, Lieutenant Joseph North, of Fairney Lawn in 1858. Joseph North and wife lived in Wivenhoe Homestead and William North and wife lived in Bellevue Homestead hut. Soon after acquiring Wivenhoe, William North Snr established a 2,000 hectares (4,900 acres) section as Bellevue Station, on which he ran sheep.

In 1868, on the Bellevue portion, the Norths built a four-roomed family residence and a Governess' residence with school room, guest bedroom and head stockman's room. An old slab hut was retained as the kitchen in a service wing. Outside bathrooms and toilets were built. In 1868–1869, the Queensland Government resumed the eastern half of Wivenhoe Run for subdivision and closer settlement, but the Norths were allowed to keep the lease of western half, the Bellevue Selection, under pre-emptive selection rights. Livestock was changed from sheep to cattle in 1870. In 1872, the Bellevue lease was purchased by Alexander Dunbar Campbell and John Hay. Five Deeds of Grant were issued. The earliest sections of Bellevue Homestead appear to date from the 1870s. None of the 1860s buildings have survived, with the older parts of the present homestead most likely constructed after the North family transferred the Bellevue leasehold to Campbell and Hay in 1872.

1880 saw the Certificate of Title purchased by Henry Grosvenor Simpson, Bellevue, and Alexander Dunbar Campbell from Sydney. Campbell became the sole owner in 1883; however, Henry Simpson and wife lived at and managed Bellevue Station from the 1870s to the 1890s. The Simpsons' three children were born at Bellevue Homestead. In 1884, James Taylor MLA, who lived in Clifford House, Toowoomba, and owned Cecil Plains and several other cattle properties, purchased Bellevue for his son, George Condamine (Con) Taylor and his wife Edith Maud (née Harris, born at Newstead House in Brisbane in 1865, daughter of George Harris MLC).

Two years later the Brisbane Valley railway line extended from Lowood to Esk with a goods platform station built at the entrance to Bellevue cattle station. In 1887, Evelyn Maud Condamine Taylor was born at Bellevue Homestead followed by Cecile Taylor's birth at Bellevue Homestead in 1891.

During the Taylors' occupancy, the 1893 Brisbane River flood washed away the mud walls of Bellevue Homestead. The walls were then clad outside with cedar weatherboards and inside with hoop pine boards covered with hessian (scrim) and wallpaper. Joan Taylor was born at Bellevue Homestead in 1897. On 6 February 1899, Con Taylor died at the homestead.

=== 20th century ===
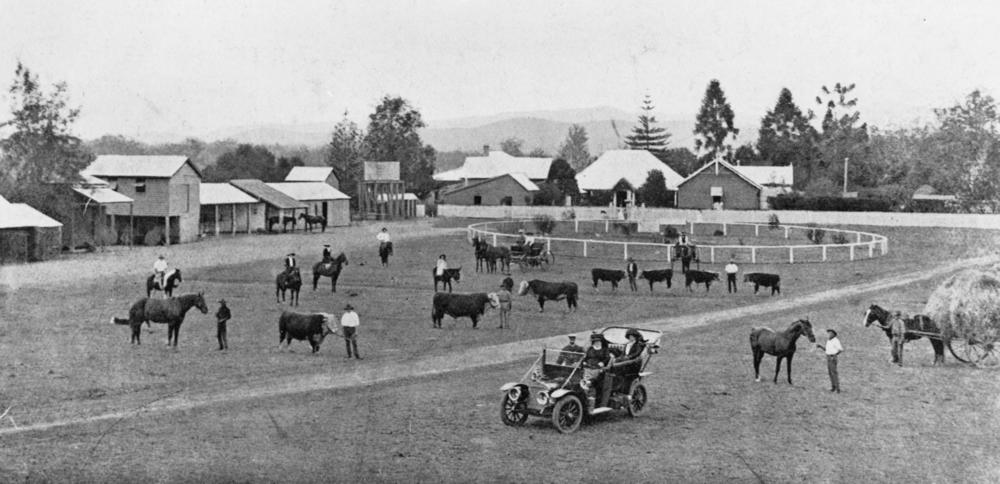
Station showring, 1912

In the early decades of the twentieth century, Bellevue Homestead was the social centre of the district. At its peak, c. 1910, the station comprised over 5,600 hectares (14,000 acres), with a Hereford stud of national renown. The property remained in the extended Taylor family until the early 1950s.

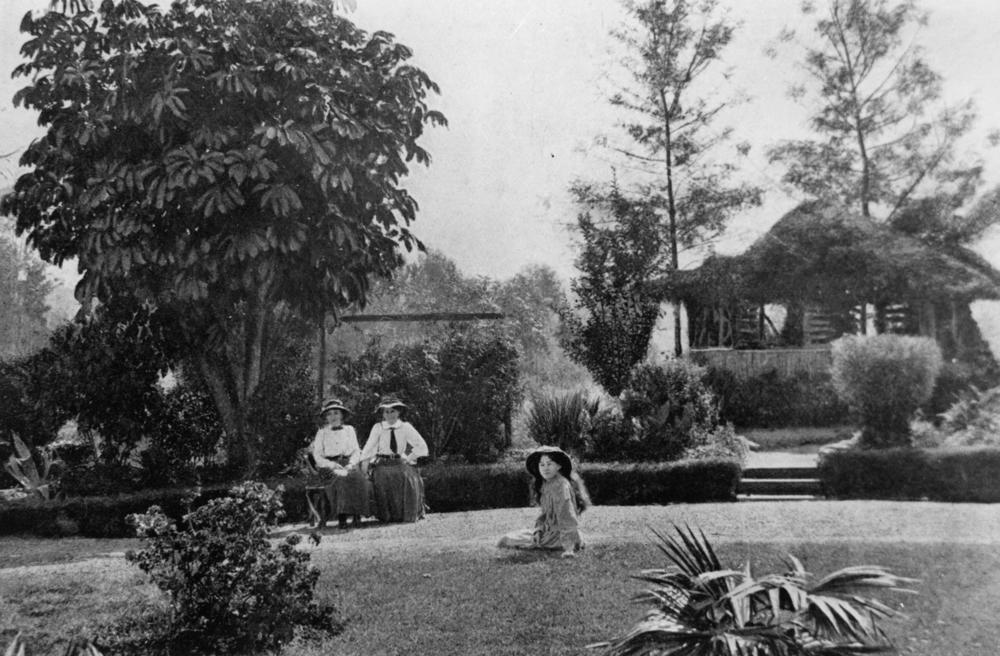
The well-manicured lawn and gardens, 1912

In 1901, widow Edith Maud Taylor married Charles Lumley Hill, Member of the Queensland Legislative Assembly, owner of several large cattle properties in Queensland, Northern Territory and Western Australia. Between 1902 and 1904 the Lumley Hills established a Hereford cattle stud by purchase of the Durandur stud, which dated back to the first imports of Herefords to the Cressy stud in Tasmania.

In 1903–1904 the Lumley Hills extended the homestead, adding a new dining room, guest suite, and servants quarters. Earlier sections of the house were renovated also.

In 1905, the name of Bellevue railway station and post office changed from Bellevue to Coominya. Charles Lumley Hill died in 1909. Nephew, Colin Hill, continued to manage Bellevue property until 1925.

The modification of the guest house and service wing occurred in 1920 for a visit by HRH Prince Edward, Prince of Wales. In 1925, Edith Maud Lumley Hill died and was buried in Toowong Cemetery, Brisbane. In the same year Bellevue was purchased by her daughter, Mrs Evelyn Watt (née Taylor) of Sydney.

In 1950, Evelyn Watt died. Christopher Alexander White and son purchased the property the following year, only to quickly sell it to Kenneth McLean. In 1953, the Hereford stud was sold. Bellevue was purchased by Valentine and Mary Crowe in 1965.

In 1975 Bellevue was resumed by the Queensland Co-Ordinator General, as part of the Wivenhoe Dam project. In the same year the homestead and associated buildings were acquired by the National Trust of Queensland, and between 1975 and 1980 were removed to nearby Coominya township, established in 1905 on part of the Bellevue selection. The Trust is restoring the complex to its 1904–1910 appearance. From 1980 to 2004, the National Trust opened Bellevue Homestead to the public for tours.

=== 21st century ===
Between 2004 and 2007 Bellevue Homestead was purchased and operated by Ken and Tanya Bullen from Toowoomba. In 2007, Bellevue Homestead was purchased by John and Laurel Dingle from Coominya and was operated by them until the sale of the property to the current owner (Christina James) in 2019.

== Description ==
Bellevue Homestead is located opposite Coominya railway station, close to the original entrance to the property. It consists of three interconnected dwellings with an attached service wing and separate farm buildings. The main farmhouse and guest house face northeast and are encircled by verandas, with a spine of kitchen, stores, servants' hall and laundry attached at right angles, forming a T-shaped plan. A cottage, previously a school house and governess' residence, is attached on the south-east forming a southern courtyard, and a row of barns and stables is located on the southwest. All buildings, with the exception of the hay loft, are single-storeyed and sit on timber stumps.

The main house comprises two chamferboard buildings which have corrugated iron hipped roofs and are joined by an enclosed verandah breezeway. The older main farmhouse has a projecting gable porch to the southwest and northeast entrances with a decorative timber barge board, truss and finial, and timber shingles are visible under the corrugated iron sheeting. The plan consists of three bedrooms and a drawing room or parlour with a central hall. The side verandahs have been enclosed to expand the rooms through large archways, the northwest being enclosed with very wide cedar chamferboards. Some rooms are in the process of restoration and show different layers of the building's fabric, including pit sawn framing with mortice and tenon joints and hand-finished lining boards. Decorative features include painted woodgrain in the hall, hand painted wall paper, pressed metal ceilings in the drawing room, carved timber fireplace surrounds, casement windows, some of which have coloured glass inserts, step out bays and pressed metal window hoods.

The attached guest house (a 1903–1904 extension) has a projecting gable porch to the northeast with decorative timber arch brackets, barge board, finial and diagonally boarded gable. The verandahs have dowel balustrade, lattice valance and timber arch brackets. The plan consists of a dining room, a smoking room and a two-roomed guest suite. These are accessed from an enclosed verandah entrance hall with entrance doors at both ends with sidelights and fanlight of etched coloured glass. All rooms have fretworked cedar ceiling roses. The dining room has a metal-lined wine store cupboard and its walls are panelled in cedar with silky oak inserts to a dado with full length vertical tongue-and-groove hoop pine boards above and along the 30-foot (9.1 m) ceiling. The tiled fireplace has a carved timber surround, and all timber is oiled/stained. The dining room also has remnants of gas fittings from the time the Homestead made its own gas from carbide, and remnants of electrical fittings from the time the Homestead generated its own electricity. All rooms have step out bays with timber shutters and internal doors have fanlights.

The service wing consists of a kitchen that was originally a single-roomed slab hut, now weather-boarded on three sides but retaining the original adze-trimmed split slab wall on the fourth side, to which have been added extensions of a store, food preparation room, servants' dining and entertainment hall and laundry. The kitchen has a corrugated iron gable roof with a verandah to the courtyard, and a scullery attached to the back and three pressed metal ridge ventilators. Timber shingles are visible under the corrugated iron sheeting and the interior has single-skin cedar board walls and a large brick fireplace with wood-burning stove, hot water donkey and a charcoal grill with dripping collection tray. A modern kitchen has been installed in one room.

On the other side of the courtyard facing the service wing, the cottage has an L-shaped plan and consists of a series of rooms added at different times. The weatherboard building has a corrugated iron gable roof with a bay to the northwest, surmounted by a gable, and verandas northeast and northwest.

A row of weatherboard farm buildings with corrugated iron gable roofs is located to the southwest. The farm buildings consist of a meat room, coach house, tack room, five slip rail stables and a two-storey hay loft. The stables have sawn cross cut timber and earth floors. The grounds include a circular drive with gardens to the north, overlooking a private dam positioned the same distance that the Brisbane River was from the house at its original location. The floor plan of the restored homestead is shown below.

== Heritage listing ==
Bellevue Homestead was listed on the Queensland Heritage Register on 21 October 1992 having satisfied the following criteria.

The place is important in demonstrating the evolution or pattern of Queensland's history.

An example of a large, evolving timber homestead complex, illustrating in form, fabric and decoration the lifestyle of the turn-of-the-century Queensland squattocracy.

Association with early European settlement of the Brisbane River Valley and the development of the pastoral industry in Queensland.

The place demonstrates rare, uncommon or endangered aspects of Queensland's cultural heritage.

Surviving evidence of timber building techniques from the 1870s.

The place is important in demonstrating the principal characteristics of a particular class of cultural places.

An example of a large, evolving timber homestead complex, illustrating in form, fabric and decoration the lifestyle of the turn-of-the-century Queensland squattocracy.

The place is important in demonstrating a high degree of creative or technical achievement at a particular period.

Surviving evidence of timber building techniques from the 1870s.

== See also ==
The Somerset Region contains a significant number of large residences in the Brisbane Valley that have been restored to their original state when built in the 19th century. Many are still lived in and can be visited as a part of the living history of the early settlement of Queensland.

In addition to the Bellevue Homestead at Coominya, other restored dwellings in the Somerset region are the Esk Heritage (Lars Anderson) House in Esk, Caboonbah Homestead, the home of Henry Plantagenet Somerset, Cressbrook Station at Toogoolawah, continuously owned by the McConnell family from the early 1840s to the present (not open to the public), Ringsfield House in Nanango, Stonehouse in Moore and the Convent, now the Heritage Centre, at Yarraman.
