= Charles Lilley =

Australian politician

The Honourable Sir Charles Lilley
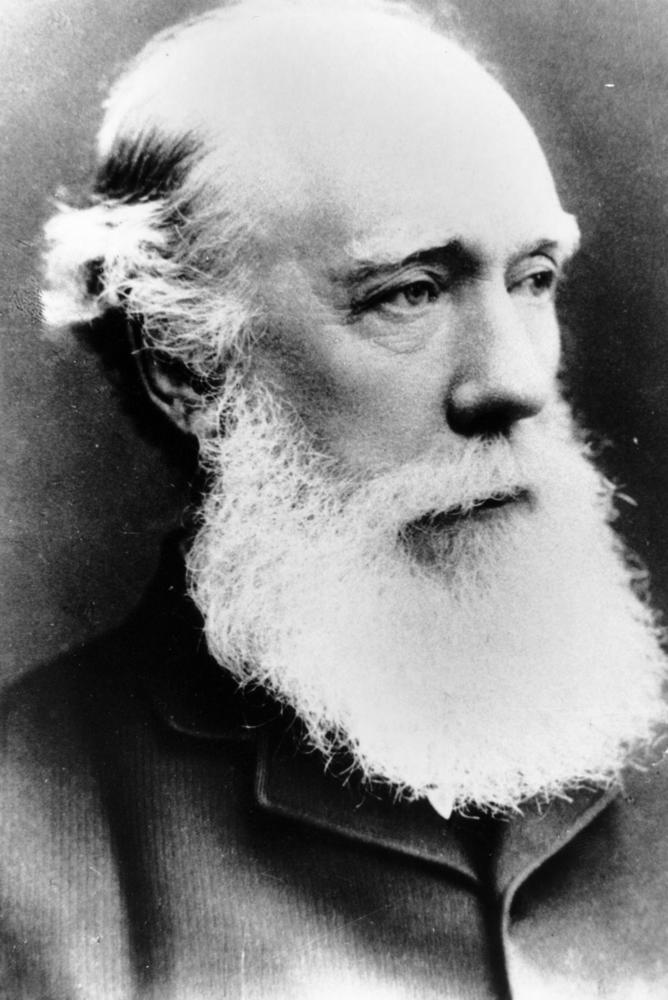

4th Premier of Queensland
- In office 25 November 1868 – 2 May 1870
- Preceded by: Robert Mackenzie
- Succeeded by: Arthur Hunter Palmer
- Constituency: Hamlet of Fortitude Valley

Member of the Queensland Legislative Assembly for Hamlet of Fortitude Valley
- In office 1 May 1860 – 25 November 1873
- Preceded by: New seat
- Succeeded by: Seat renamed to Fortitude Valley

Member of the Queensland Legislative Assembly for Fortitude Valley
- In office 25 November 1873 – 14 February 1874
- Preceded by: Seat renamed from Hamlet of Fortitude Valley
- Succeeded by: Francis Beattie

2nd Chief Justice of Queensland
- In office 25 June 1879 – 13 March 1893
- Preceded by: James Cockle
- Succeeded by: Samuel Griffith

Personal details
- Born: 27 August 1827 Newcastle upon Tyne, England
- Died: 20 August 1897 (aged 69) Brisbane, Queensland
- Resting place: Toowong Cemetery
- Spouse: Sarah Jane Jeays
- Relations: Joshua Jeays (father-in-law)
- Occupation: Barrister, Judge

Sir Charles Lilley (27 August 1827 – 20 August 1897) was a Premier and Chief Justice of the Supreme Court of Queensland. He had a significant influence on the form and spirit of state education in colonial Queensland which lasted well into the 20th century.

== Early life ==
Lilley was born in Newcastle upon Tyne, England, the son of Thomas Lilley and his wife Jane, née Shipley. Lilley was raised by his maternal grandfather and was educated at St Nicholas Parish School. Intending to study law, Lilley became articled to Newcastle solicitor, William Lockey Harle. Lilley was sent to the London office and studied at University College, London for two years. He gave this up, enlisted in the army and, while stationed at Preston, Lancashire, lectured on temperance and industry. This brought him into disfavour with his superior officers. Lilley spent 28 days in cells on a charge of being absence without leave. Friends purchased his honourable discharge.

== Politics ==
Lilley was prominent in the movement for separation from New South Wales. After Queensland separated, Lilley was elected by a majority of only three votes as the Member for Hamlet of Fortitude Valley to that state's first Legislative Assembly. At the time, Lilley had formed the Queensland Liberal Association in an attempt to introduce political parties to the Legislative Assembly. Lilley held the seat of Fortitude Valley to February 1874, and was then returned for the seat of North Brisbane.

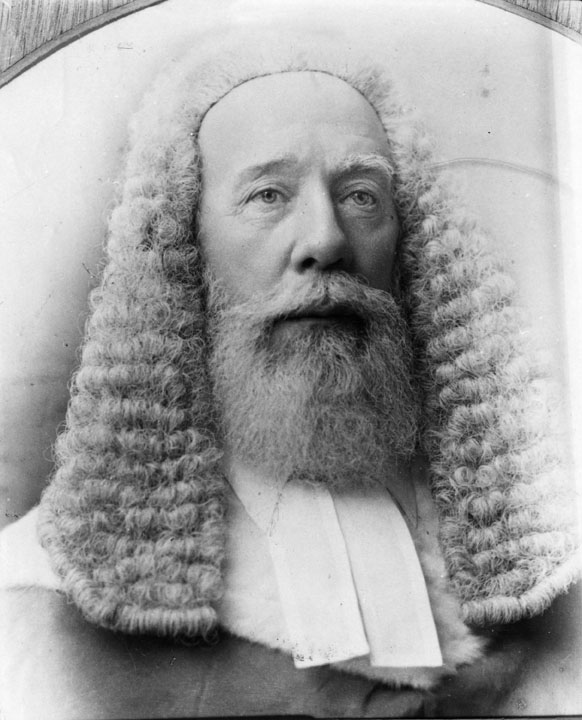
Lilley in courtroom attire

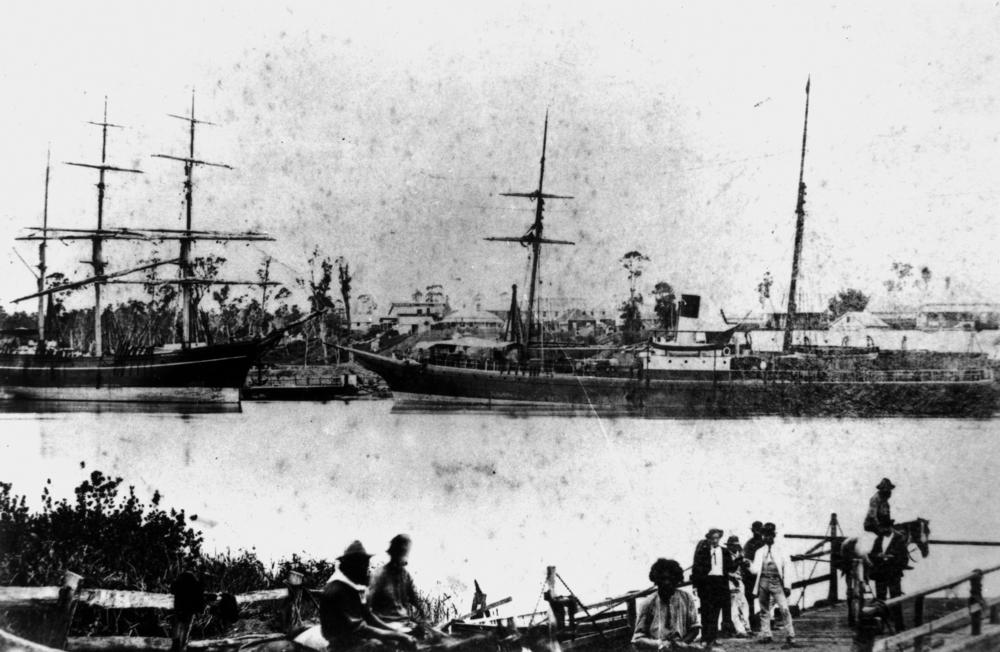
Governor Blackall in Maryborough, Queensland, c. 1870

Lilley's strong interest in education was a significant factor in the establishment of Brisbane Grammar School where the Lilley Gold Medal and the Lilley Silver Medal are named in his honour. The Lilley Centre opened in 2010 is also named after him. In 1891 he was chairman of a commission investigating the establishment of a university in Brisbane. In 1893, Lilley resigned his position as Chief Justice after Sir Thomas McIlwraith questioned publicly some of Lilley's financial transactions, and stood unsuccessfully against McIlwraith in the electorate of Brisbane North.

== Later life ==
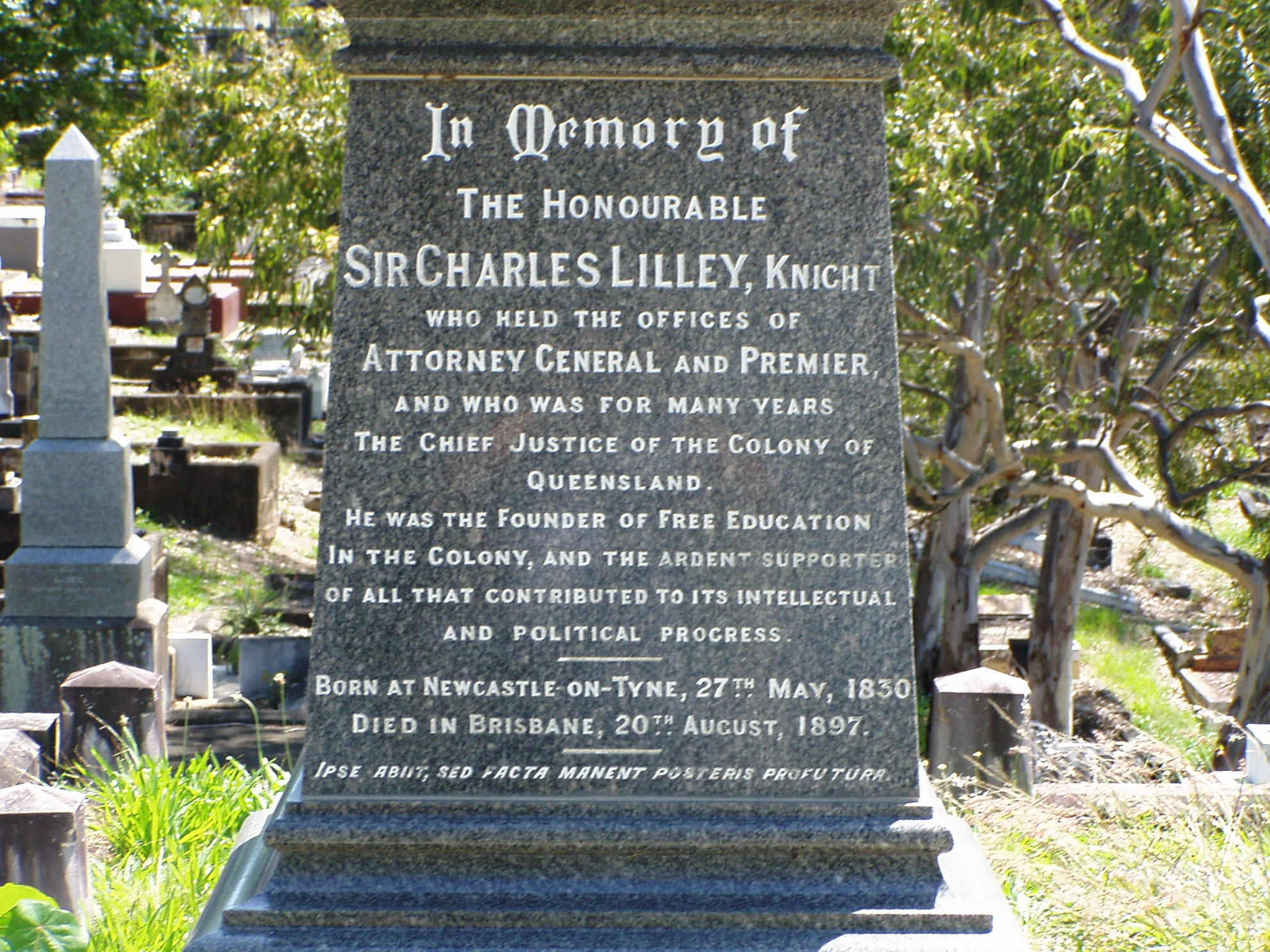
Monument at the burial site of Sir Charles Lilley at Brisbane's Toowong Cemetery

In January 1881 he was elected president of Brisbane's Johnsonian Club. He was knighted in May 1881 and after first declining the honour, he reconsidered and accepted the honour later that year.

Lilley had a severe illness in 1896 and died in 1897.

== Legacy ==
The Federal electorate of Lilley is named after him.

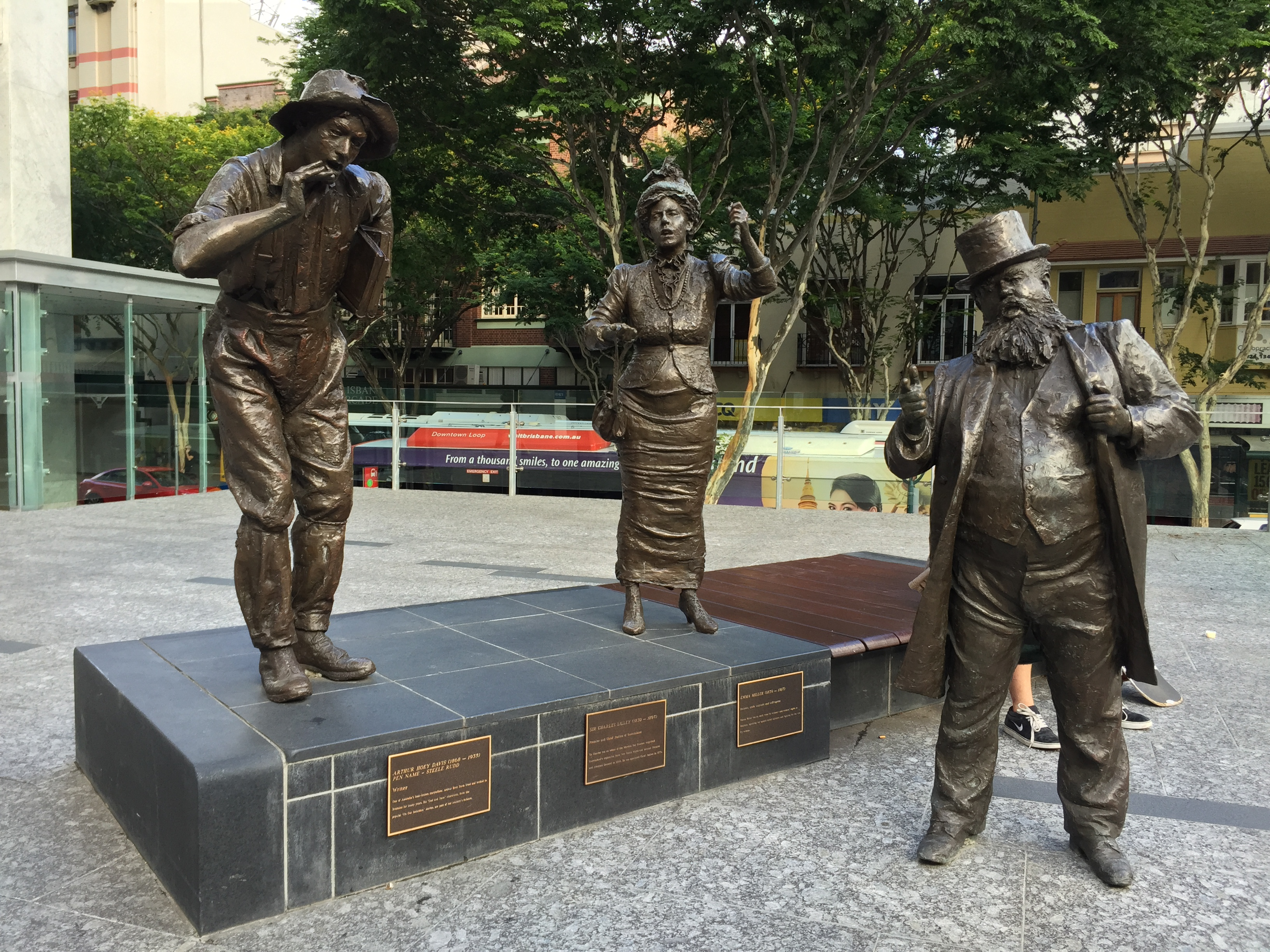
Sir Charles Lilley statue in King George Square, Brisbane

There is a statue of Sir Charles Lilley at the Speakers' Corner in King George Square in Brisbane.

== Family ==
Lilley married Sarah Jane Jeays in 1858 and was survived by a large family including:

- Edwyn Mitford (1859–1911)
- Charles Bedell (1860–1918)
- Annie Mary (1862 – ?)
- Walter Preston (1863–1916)
- Harold Bedell (1864–1901)
- Arthur Shipley (1866–1948)

== See also ==
- Judiciary of Australia
- List of Judges of the Supreme Court of Queensland
- Members of the Queensland Legislative Assembly, 1860–1863; 1863–1867; 1867–1868; 1868–1870; 1870–1871; 1871–1873; 1873–1878

Political offices
Preceded by Robert Mackenzie	Premier of Queensland; 1868–1870	Succeeded by Arthur Palmer
Parliament of Queensland
New seat	Hamlet of Fortitude Valley; 1860–1873	Succeeded by Seat renamed to Fortitude Valley
Preceded by Seat renamed from Hamlet of Fortitude Valley	Fortitude Valley; 1873–1874	Succeeded by Francis Beattie
Legal offices
Preceded by James Cockle	Chief Justice of Queensland; 1879–1893	Succeeded by Samuel Griffith
