= John Walsh (Australian politician) =

Australian politician

Member of the Queensland Legislative Assembly for Cook
- In office 5 December 1878 – 30 October 1883 Serving with Frederick Cooper
- Preceded by: New seat
- Succeeded by: John Hamilton

Personal details
- Born: John Walsh; 1842 County Galway, Ireland
- Died: 13 February 1893 (aged 50 or 51) Randwick, New South Wales, Australia
- Resting place: Waverley Cemetery
- Spouse: Margaret Jane Clohesy (m.1867)
- Occupation: Storekeeper

John Walsh (1842 – 13 February 1893) was a politician in Queensland, Australia. He was a Member of the Queensland Legislative Assembly.

== Early life ==
Walsh was born in Oughterard, County Galway, Ireland. He married Margaret Jane Clohesy on 28 December 1867.

== Career ==
Walsh was a storekeeper in Cooktown, Queensland, 1874–79, and a storekeeper in Smithfield, Cairns, 1877. He became Mayor of Cooktown, 1876–77. He represented the electoral district of Cook from 5 December 1878 to 30 October 1883. As member for Cook he lobbied for a rail link to Cooktown to support the gold mining in the district.

He went on to become a railway contractor and investor in New South Wales, 1884.

== Later life ==
Walsh died on 13 February 1893 in Randwick, Sydney. His funeral was held at Our Lady of the Sacred Heart Catholic Church in Randwick after which he was buried in Waverley Cemetery.

Parliament of Queensland
New seat	Member for Cook; 1878–1883; Served alongside: Frederick Cooper	Succeeded by John Hamilton
