= John Hargreaves (Queensland politician) =

Member of the Queensland Legislative Assembly

Member of the Queensland Legislative Assembly for Cook
- In office 27 Aug 1904 – 19 Jan 1907
- Preceded by: John Hamilton
- Succeeded by: Henry Douglas

Personal details
- Born: John Henry Hargreaves; 1839 Gravesend, Kent, England
- Died: 19 January 1907 (aged 68) Cooktown, Queensland, Australia
- Resting place: Lost at sea
- Party: Ministerialist
- Spouse: Mahala Gee (m.1875 d.1905)
- Occupation: Builder

John Henry Hargreaves (1839 – 19 January 1907) was a member of the Queensland Legislative Assembly.

== Biography ==
Hargreaves was born in Gravesend, Kent, the son of John Henry Hargreaves Snr. and his wife Charlotte (née Furner). He arrived in Queensland for a goldfields expedition and then established a timber and building business in Cooktown around 1878.

On 26 April 1875 he married Mahala Gee (died 1905) in Townsville and together had four sons and three daughters. He drowned on the government-owned ketch, the Pilot, which went missing during the 1907 Cooktown cyclone. His body was not recovered but a memorial to him is at the Cooktown Cemetery.

== Public career ==
At the 1904 Queensland state election, Hargreaves won the seat of Cook for the Ministerialists, defeating the Labour candidate, Mr Le Vaux by two votes. As it was only four months before the 1907 Queensland state election when he died, no by-election was held.

Hargreaves had previously been a councilor on the Shire of Cook and was its Mayor from 1901 until 1904.

Parliament of Queensland
Preceded by John Hamilton	Member for Cook; 1904–1907	Succeeded by Henry Douglas
