= Thomas McWhannell =

Australian politician

Thomas McWhannell (17 March 1844 – 17 March 1888) was a politician and sheep grazier in Queensland, Australia. He was a Member of the Queensland Legislative Assembly for the Gregory District (1882–1888).

== Early life ==
McWhannell was born 17 March 1844 at Lochearnhead, Perthshire, Scotland, to sheep farmers Duncan and Jean McWhannell. He was Presbyterian. He attended secondary school at Perth Academy and was educated further at Andersonian University, Glasgow.

He arrived in Queensland with his brother James Cooper McWhannell in 1861.

He married Jessie McWhannell (née Morgan) 12 March 1979 at All Saints Church, Petersham, New South Wales. They had one son, Rodney(1881–1954), and two daughters, Isobel and Jessie.

McWhannell's brother James married McWhannell's wife's sister Fanny.

== Pastorlist ==
McWhannell and his brother were squatters before purchasing the following properties as sheep graziers: Rodney Downs at Aramac (70,000 sheep), and Headingly, Undilla, Stoney Plains and Oban on the Barkly Tableland (35,000–40,000 sheep).

== Politics ==
On 20 February 1882, Charles Lumley Hill, the Member of the Legislative Assembly for Gregory, resigned. McWhannell won the resulting by-election unopposed on 21 March 1882. He retained his seat in the 1883 election (again unopposed) and held it until his death on 21 March 1888. His death did not trigger a by-election as the 1888 election was to be held in April–May 1888.

He was also President of the Graziers Association. He was the first Chairman of the Aramac Divisional Board.

== Later life ==
In January 1888, McWhannell indicated he would retire from politics due to ill health. In February 1888 he was in Sydney staying at the home of his mother-in-law receiving medical treatments for kidney disease and dropsy in his feet.

McWhannell died 17 March 1888 in Ashfield, Sydney, New South Wales, Australia. He was buried in the Anglican section of the Waverley Cemetery in Sydney. His wife Jessie remained in Sydney and died at Strathfield on 21 August 1927; she was buried with her husband in Waverley Cemetery.

McWhannell was described as a man of "shrewd commensense and quiet but firm expression of the opinions he held".

== Legacy ==
McWhannell Street in Aramac is named after him.

== See also ==
- Members of the Queensland Legislative Assembly: 1878–1883; 1883–1888
