= Austin Chapman =

Australian politician (1864–1926)

The Honourable Sir Austin Chapman KCMG
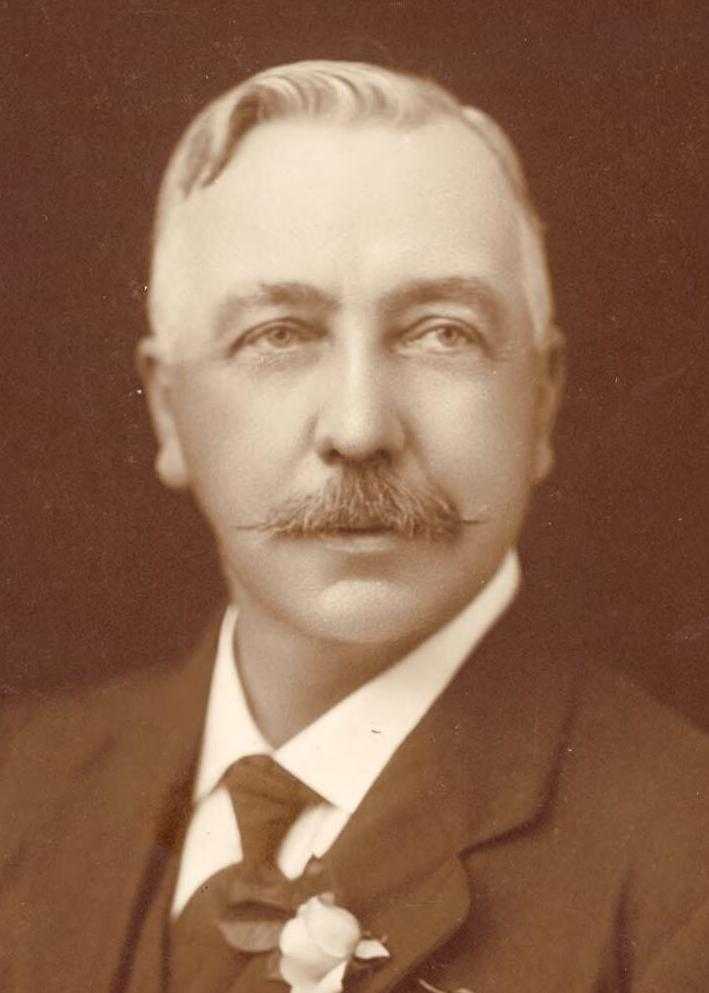

Minister for Health
- In office 9 February 1923 – 26 May 1924
- Prime Minister: Stanley Bruce
- Preceded by: Walter Massy-Greene
- Succeeded by: Herbert Pratten

Minister for Trade and Customs
- In office 9 February 1923 – 26 May 1924
- Prime Minister: Stanley Bruce
- Preceded by: Arthur Rodgers
- Succeeded by: Herbert Pratten
- In office 30 July 1907 – 13 November 1908
- Prime Minister: Alfred Deakin
- Preceded by: William Lyne
- Succeeded by: Frank Tudor

Postmaster-General of Australia
- In office 5 July 1905 – 30 July 1907
- Prime Minister: Alfred Deakin
- Preceded by: Sydney Smith
- Succeeded by: Samuel Mauger

Minister for Defence
- In office 24 September 1903 – 27 April 1904
- Prime Minister: Alfred Deakin
- Preceded by: James Drake
- Succeeded by: Anderson Dawson

Member of the Australian Parliament for Eden-Monaro
- In office 29 March 1901 – 12 January 1926
- Preceded by: New seat
- Succeeded by: John Perkins

Personal details
- Born: Austen Chapman; 10 July 1864 Bong Bong, Colony of New South Wales
- Died: 12 January 1926 (aged 61) Sydney, Australia
- Party: Protectionist (1901–1909); Liberal (1909–1917); Nationalist (1917–1926)
- Spouse: Catherine O'Brien (m. 1894)
- Relations: Albert Chapman (brother)
- Children: 4, including John
- Occupation: Company director

Sir Austin Chapman KCMG (10 July 1864 – 12 January 1926) was an Australian politician who served in the House of Representatives from 1901 until his death in 1926. He held ministerial office in the governments of Alfred Deakin and Stanley Bruce, serving as Minister for Defence (1903–1904), Postmaster-General (1905–1907), Minister for Trade and Customs (1907–1908, 1923–1924), and Minister for Health (1923–1924).

== Early life ==
Chapman was born on 10 July 1864 in Bong Bong, New South Wales. He was the son of Monica (née Cain; also spelt Kean or Kein) and Richard Chapman, his father being a wheelwright and publican. His mother was born in Ireland. His given name was spelled "Austen" until 1897.

Chapman attended the state school in Marulan until the age of 14, when he was apprenticed to a saddler working in Goulburn and Mudgee. By 1885 he was operating Chapman's Hotel in Bungendore, close to the eventual site of Canberra. Chapman moved to Sydney in 1887 and went into partnership with Edward William O'Sullivan in an auctioneering firm, of which he was managing partner. He was also the proprietor of the Emu Inn on Bathurst Street. His partnership with O'Sullivan was dissolved in 1889, and he subsequently established the Royal Hotel in Braidwood.

== Early political involvement ==
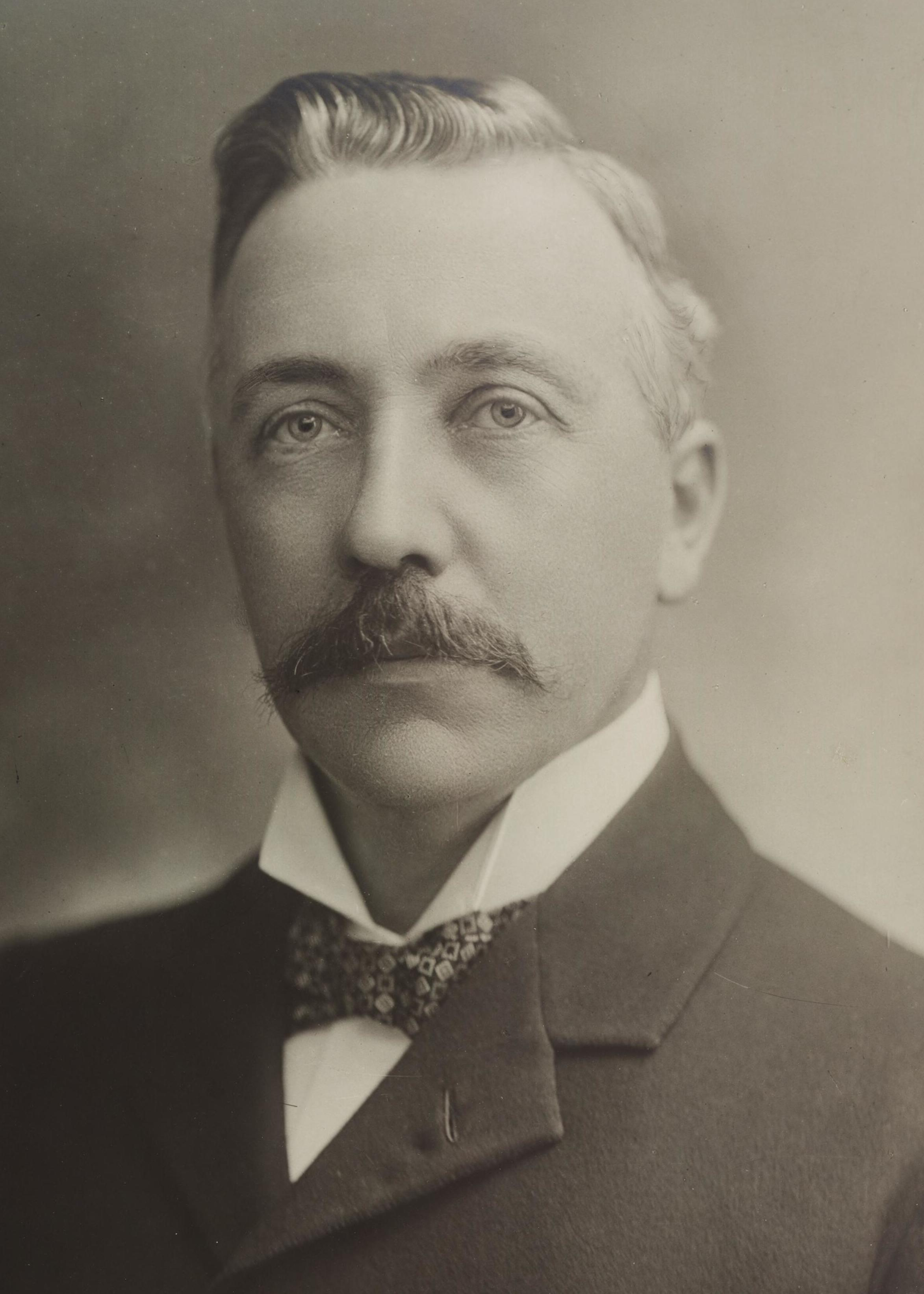
Chapman c. 1907/08

In 1891 Chapman was elected to the New South Wales Legislative Assembly as MLA for Braidwood. He was an active supporter of federation of the Australian colonies. After his election to federal parliament he was succeeded in the seat of Braidwood by his brother Albert Chapman.

Chapman was elected to the House of Representatives at the inaugural 1901 federal election, winning the seat of Eden-Monaro as a Protectionist candidate. He was re-elected on nine occasions, twice running unopposed. He joined the new Liberal Party upon its creation in 1909 and the Nationalist Party upon its creation in 1917.

== Party politics and ministerial service ==
Chapman was a close friend of Prime Minister Edmund Barton and was chosen as the inaugural government whip in 1901. Barton relied on him for management of the Protectionist MPs in parliamentary divisions, at a time when the government had a minority and was reliant on Free Trade Party or Australian Labor Party (ALP) support to pass legislation.

In 1903, following Barton's retirement, Chapman was appointed Minister for Defence in the new government formed by Alfred Deakin, shortly before the Defence Act 1903 introduced by his predecessor James Drake was passed into law. He remained in office until the government's defeat in 1904. Chapman faced a number of challenges as the colonial forces continued their integration into the Australian Army, including delays in payment which led Tasmanian soldiers to openly strike in February 1904 in front of Chapman and Edward Hutton.

Chapman was appointed Postmaster-General when Deakin returned as prime minister in 1905. In that capacity he was a strong supporter of a national Penny Post scheme. Chapman also served as chairman of the royal commission into old-age pensions, which reported in 1906. He was appointed Minister for Trade and Customs in a ministerial reshuffle in 1907. In that role he introduced regulations for a standard wheat bag of 200 pounds (91 kg), which became known as the "Chapman sack". He did not return to the ministry in Deakin's third government, due to a severe stroke he suffered in 1909 which paralysed one arm.

After the defeat of the government's proposal at the 1917 Australian conscription referendum, Chapman was a leader of moves to force the resignation of Billy Hughes as Nationalist leader and prime minister. Victorian MP James Boyd unsuccessfully moved a motion calling on Chapman or Alexander Poynton to form a new caretaker government in place of Hughers. In January 1918 Chapman and William Irvine seriously considered siding with an ALP no-confidence motion in Hughes, but were dissuaded by threats of a snap election.

In the early 1920s Chapman became an advocate of the new state movement. He supported the admission of the Riverina as a separate state, at the time supporting the abolition of state parliaments in favour of a single national parliament and the merger of state government departments into federal departments. His views brought him close to Country Party leader Earle Page and he appeared at some Country Party conferences, although he did not join the parliamentary Country Party.

Following the 1922 federal election, which resulted in a hung parliament, Chapman was again among the Nationalist MPs who agitated for the removal of Hughes. He consulted with Page and supported S. M. Bruce as Hughes' successor. After Bruce and Page formed a a coalition government in 1923, Chapman was appointed Minister for Trade and Customs for a second time and Minister for Health, as one of only four members of cabinet with prior ministerial experience. He resigned from cabinet in May 1924 due to ill health, and was appointed as a Knight Commander of the Order of St Michael and St George (KCMG) in the 1924 Birthday Honours.

Upon Chapman's retirement from the ministry, Henry Gullett wrote in The Sunday Times that he "had his meddlesome, clever fingers in more federal political pies than any other member who has sat in the House", but described him as more a politician than statesman and not one of the "giants of the federal field".

== Advocacy for Canberra ==
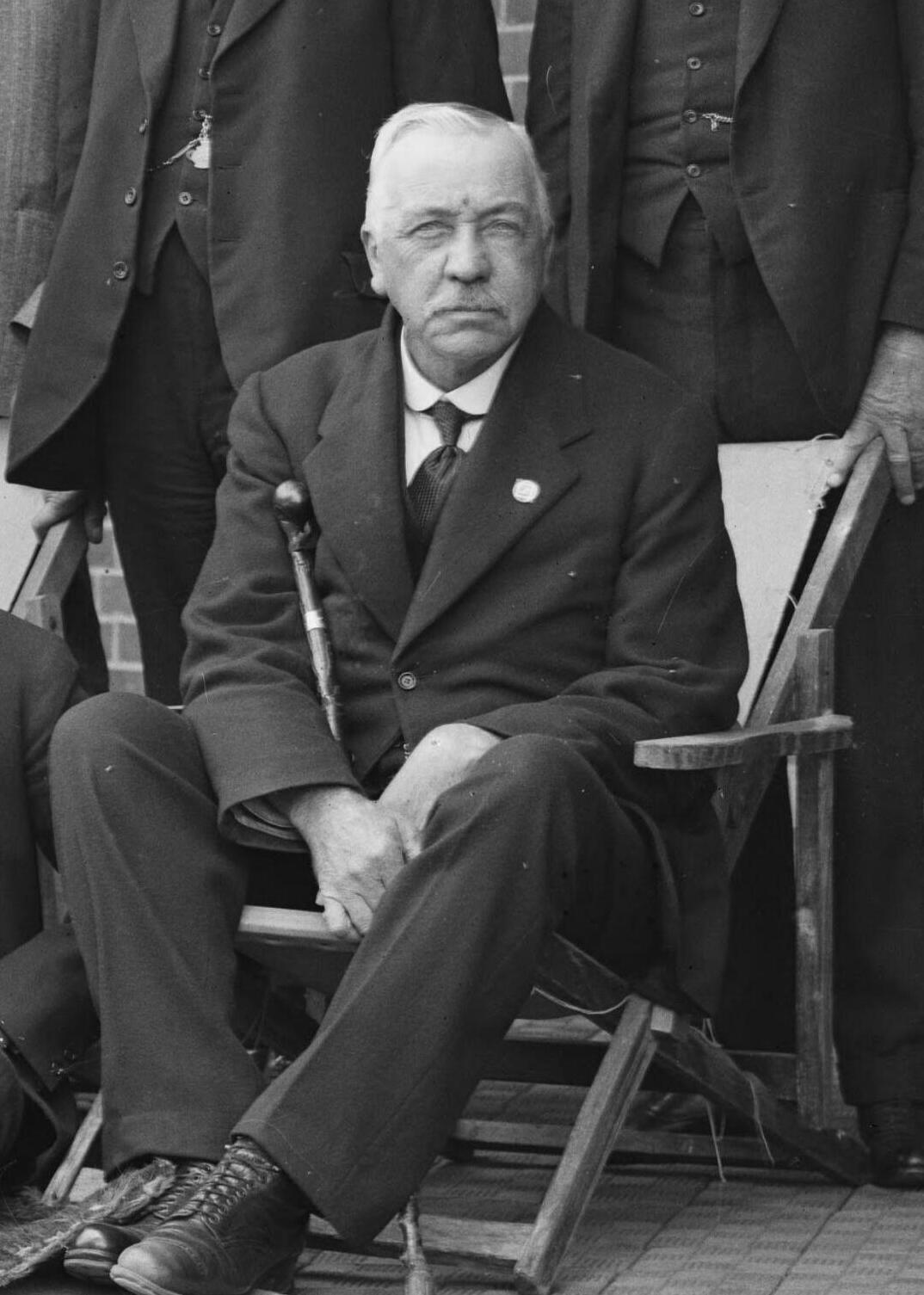
Chapman in 1924 at the first cabinet meeting in Canberra

Chapman had a significant role during the selection of Australia's national capital site, Canberra. A strong advocate for the rival site of Dalgety—legislated as the capital site by the Seat of Government Act 1904—he stated in August 1906 that, "I will defend Dalgety to the end. Any change from the selection already made can only be achieved over my political corpse."

In early 1908, he conceded that Canberra was "the second best site, but Dalgety easily stands first." As the process finally reached its conclusion, later in 1908, Chapman was suffering ill health. In his absence, although he had been paired for the ballots so as not to prejudice the outcome, at the ninth ballot Dalgety went down to Yass-Canberra by 39 votes to 33.

However, once Canberra had been selected, Chapman strenuously advocated the development of the site on the Molonglo River near Queanbeyan, which like Dalgety was in his electorate. He became "a fanatical, and yet an effective, advocate of the transfer of the federal capital to Canberra", at a time when there was pressure on the federal government to postpone construction activities and remain in Melbourne for reasons of cost. The success of his efforts benefited many of his friends who owned land in the area, and also greatly boosted trade in Queanbeyan, the nearest town to the site. He was still MP for Eden-Monaro at the time of his death, which occurred in 1926 before he could sit in the first Parliament House in Canberra, which opened in May 1927.

== Personal life ==
In 1894, Chapman married Catherine O'Brien, the daughter of a cattle station owner. The couple had four children including James Austin Chapman and John Austin Chapman who both became distinguished soldiers. He died of cerebrovascular disease in Sydney on 12 January 1926, aged 61. The Canberra suburb of Chapman was named after him.

Chapman was one of the few Roman Catholic MPs outside of the Labor Party during his political career. In 1902, while accompanying Edmund Barton to the coronation of Edward VII and Alexandra, he received an audience before Pope Leo XIII in Rome.

Political offices
Preceded by James Drake	Minister for Defence; 1903–1904	Succeeded by Anderson Dawson
Preceded by Sydney Smith	Postmaster-General; 1905–1907	Succeeded by Samuel Mauger
Preceded by William Lyne	Minister for Trade and Customs; 1907–1908	Succeeded by Frank Tudor
Preceded by Arthur Rodgers	Minister for Trade and Customs; 1923–1924	Succeeded by Littleton Groom
Preceded by Walter Massy-Greene	Minister for Health; 1923–1924	Succeeded by Herbert Pratten
New South Wales Legislative Assembly
Preceded by Alexander Ryrie	Member for Braidwood; 1891–1901	Succeeded by Albert Chapman
Parliament of Australia
New parliament	Member for Eden-Monaro; 1901–1926	Succeeded by John Perkins
