= Electoral district of Cook =

State electoral district of Queensland, Australia

Cook Queensland—Legislative Assembly
- Electoral map of Cook, 2017
- State: Queensland
- MP: David Kempton
- Party: Liberal National
- Namesake: James Cook
- Electors: 33,912 (2020)
- Area: 196,836 km^{2} (75,998.8 sq mi)
- Demographic: Remote
- Coordinates: 13°34′S 143°28′E
Electorates around Cook:
Gulf of Carpentaria	Torres Strait	Coral Sea
Gulf of Carpentaria	Cook	Coral Sea
Traeger	Hill	Barron River; Mulgrave

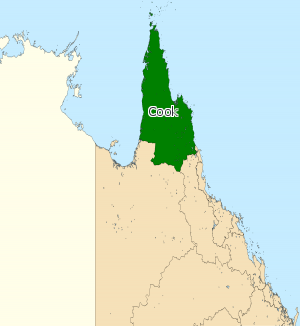
Electoral map of Cook, 2008

Cook is an electoral district represented in the Legislative Assembly of the Australian state of Queensland. Cook covers the vast Cape York Peninsula north of Cairns, including the resort town of Port Douglas and the Torres Strait Islands.

The seat is named after British navigator James Cook, who charted the coast and landed on Possession Island – one of the Torres Strait islands – in 1770.

Since 2024 the member for Cook has been David Kempton of the Liberal National Party.

== History ==
=== 1883 election ===
In the 1883 election, there were four candidates for the (then) two-member electorate. They were:

- Thomas Campbell
- Frederick Cooper (one of the sitting members)
- John Hamilton
- Charles Lumley Hill (a former member in Gregory)

Cooper and Hamilton were elected, but there were allegations of "ballot stuffing", specifically that there were too many votes cast at the California Gully and Halpin's Creek polling stations given the number of electors. The unsuccessful candidates, Campbell and Hill, petitioned to overturn the ballot. In December 1883, arrests were made in connection with the ballot stuffing. On 4 March 1884, the Elections and Qualifications Committee determined that Frederick Cooper should not be elected and that Thomas Campbell should be elected instead.

=== 1884 by-election ===
On 4 August 1885, Thomas Campbell resigned after having been declared insolvent. Charles Lumley Hill won the resulting by-election on 16 September 1885.

=== 1888 election ===
At the 1888 election, Cook returned to being a single-member electorate. Of the two sitting members, Hamilton contested the seat but Hill did not, saying that he was retiring from politics. However, Hill did not retire, but instead contested the election in Port Curtis, but he was unsuccessful. Hamilton was elected in Cook.

== Members for Cook ==
First incarnation (1876–1878, 1 member)
Member	Party	Term
William Edward Murphy	Unaligned	1876–1878
Second incarnation (1878–1888, 2 members)
Member	Party	Term
John Walsh	Unaligned	1878–1883
Frederick Cooper	Unaligned	1878–1884
John Hamilton	Ministerialist	1883–1888
Thomas Campbell	Unaligned	1884–1885
Charles Lumley Hill	Unaligned	1885–1888
Third incarnation (1888–present, 1 member)
Member	Party	Term
John Hamilton	Ministerialist	1888–1904
John Hargreaves	Ministerialist	1904–1907
Henry Douglas	Ministerialist / Opposition / Independent Opposition / Ministerialist / Liberal	1907–1915
Henry Ryan	Labor	1915–1929
James Kenny	Country and Progressive National	1929–1935
Harold Collins	Labor	1935–1950
Carlisle Wordsworth	Country	1950–1953
Bunny Adair	Labor	1953–1957
Bunny Adair	Queensland Labor	1957–1963
Bunny Adair	Independent	1963–1969
Bill Wood	Labor	1969–1972
Edwin Wallis-Smith	Labor	1972–1974
Eric Deeral	National	1974–1977
Bob Scott	Labor	1977–1989
Steve Bredhauer	Labor	1989–2004
Jason O'Brien	Labor	2004–2012
David Kempton	Liberal National	2012–2015
Billy Gordon	Labor	2015
Billy Gordon	Independent	2015–2017
Cynthia Lui	Labor	2017–2024
David Kempton	Liberal National	2024–present

== Election results ==
2024 Queensland state election: Cook
Party	Candidate	Votes	%	±%
Labor	Cynthia Lui	8,744	33.34	−6.68
Liberal National	David Kempton	8,728	33.28	+9.18
Katter's Australian	Duane Amos	5,158	19.67	+2.45
One Nation	Peter Campion	1,832	6.98	+0.35
Greens	Troy Miller	1,765	6.73	+1.69
Total formal votes		26,227	95.72	+0.03
Informal votes		1,172	4.28	−0.03
Turnout		27,399	74.88	−4.91
Two-party-preferred result
Liberal National	David Kempton	14,419	54.98	+11.24
Labor	Cynthia Lui	11,808	45.02	−11.24
Liberal National gain from Labor		Swing	+11.24	
