= Thomas Campbell (Australian politician) =

Australian politician (1845–1885)

Thomas Joseph Campbell
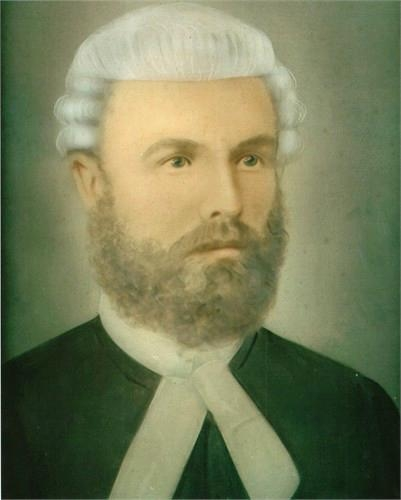

Member of the Queensland Legislative Assembly for Cook
- In office 4 March 1884 – 4 August 1885 Serving with John Hamilton and Sir Samuel Griffith
- Preceded by: Frederick Cooper
- Succeeded by: Charles Hill

Personal details
- Born: Thomas Joseph Campbell; 1845 Maghery, County Armagh, Northern Ireland
- Died: 6 November 1885 (aged 39–40) Townsville, Queensland
- Resting place: West End Cemetery, Townsville
- Spouse: Mary Hanley (m. 1873)
- Relations: Terence Lafferty, BA Sydney University, Director Townsville Technical College
- Occupation: Teacher/Headmaster and Barrister

Thomas Joseph Campbell (1845 – 6 November 1885) was a politician in colonial Queensland. He was a member of the Queensland Legislative Assembly from 1884 to 1885, representing the electorate of Cook.

== Early life ==
Campbell was the son of John and Catherine Campbell (née Johnson).

== Politics ==
In August 1883 at a public meeting in Mackay, Queensland, Campbell condemned the policies of the then Premier, Sir Thomas McIlwraith, and informed those present that he had great faith in Sir Samuel Griffith who was subsequently elected Premier of Queensland in November 1883.

Campbell was declared insolvent on 27 July 1885 and he tendered his resignation from the parliament. As had occurred on a previous occasion when a member was declared insolvent, it was thought proper for the Queensland Parliament to move that the seat be declared vacant by reason of the insolvency of the member. On 4 August 1885 the then Premier, Samuel Griffith, moved: "That the seat of Thomas Campbell hath become and is now vacant by reason of the insolvency of the said Thomas Campbell since his election and return to serve in this House as one of the members for the electoral district of Cook." The question was put and passed.

== Later life ==
Thomas Campbell's headstone at West End Cemetery, 2012

Campbell died in Townsville at the Imperial Hotel on 6 November 1885, aged 40 when he was visiting North Queensland on a court case and was buried in the West End Cemetery in Townsville. According to The Gympie Times, "he had been laid up at the Imperial Hotel for three days with an attack of asthma, but on Friday he was seized with convulsive fits, which continued until his death, the cause of which is said to have been Bright's disease" and that he was "a fine scholar and a man of great natural ability and application - as is shown by the fact that whilst fulfilling his responsible scholastic duties, he, quite unaided, managed to qualify himself for admission to the bar".

== Family ==
Wife Mary (née Hanley), circa 1915

Parliament of Queensland
Preceded by Frederick Cooper	Member for Cook; 4 March 1884 – 4 August 1885; Served alongside: John Hamilton	Succeeded by Charles Hill
