= Samuel Wood Brooks =

Australian politician

Member of the Queensland Legislative Assembly for Fortitude Valley
- In office 1 May 1886 – 12 May 1888 Serving with John McMaster
- Preceded by: Francis Beattie
- Succeeded by: John Watson

Personal details
- Born: Samuel Wood Brooks; 29 August 1840 Beeston, Nottinghamshire, England
- Died: 9 February 1915 (aged 74) New Farm, Queensland, Australia
- Resting place: Toowong Cemetery
- Spouse: Hannah Walker (m.1864 d.1927)
- Occupation: Newspaper proprietor

Samuel Wood Brooks (29 August 1840 – 9 February 1915) was a missionary and member of the Queensland Legislative Assembly.

== Biography ==
Brooks was born in Beeston, Nottinghamshire, to parents Francis Beattie and his wife Susannah (née Hannah). He attended school in Nottinghamshire and became a Wesleyan Missionary Student by 1863. He did missionary work in Fiji from 1865 but he was found to be having a relationship with a neighboring planter's wife and had to pay his own way back to Sydney in 1875.

In Sydney, Brooks became a private school owner and was a partner in Brentnall Bros and Broola, Merchants in 1880. He came to Brisbane and worked for the Brisbane Telegraph writing for the Brisbane Courier. He became the proprietor of the Queensland Figaro and the Moreton Mail in 1896. He was the Commissioner of the Brisbane Hospital and President of the Queensland Press Association and the Brisbane School of Arts.

On 29 November 1864, he married Hannah Walker (died 1927) in Sydney and together had two sons and one daughter. Brooks died at New Farm, Brisbane in February 1915 and buried in the Toowong Cemetery.

== Political career ==
Brooks was the member for Fortitude Valley in the Queensland Legislative Assembly from 1886 until 1888.

Parliament of Queensland
Preceded by Francis Beattie	Member for Fortitude Valley; 1886–1888; Served alongside: John McMaster	Succeeded by John Watson
