= Albert Chapman =

Australian politician

Albert Edward Chapman (3 June 1872 – 1945) was an Australian politician.

He was born at Marulan to wheelwright and publican Richard Chapman and Monica Cain. He attended the local public school and then St Patrick's College in Goulburn before becoming a schoolteacher. From 1894 he worked as an auctioneer and agent with his brother, Austin Chapman. He was elected to the New South Wales Legislative Assembly in 1901 as the Progressive member for Braidwood, succeeding his brother who had transferred to federal politics, but in 1904 he retired due to the reduction in the size of the Assembly. From 1917 to 1918 he served in the Australian Imperial Force as a private. Unmarried and childless, Chapman died some time in 1945.

New South Wales Legislative Assembly
Preceded by Austin Chapman	Member for Braidwood; 1901–1904	Abolished
