= 1883 Queensland colonial election =

Elections were held in the Australian state of Queensland between 10 August 1883 and 30 October 1883 to elect the members of the state's Legislative Assembly.

== Key dates ==
Due to problems of distance and communications, it was not possible to hold the elections on a single day. The elections were held in seven sets:

1. Nominations: 10 August. Polling: 17 August. Electorates: Aubigny, Blackall, Dalby, Logan, Mackay, Maryborough (2 members), Mulgrave, Normanby, Port Curtis, Rockhampton (2 members)
2. Nominations: 18 August. Polling: 21 August. Electorates: Bundamba, Enoggera (2 members), Fortitude Valley, Ipswich (2 members), North Brisbane (2 members), Oxley, Rosewood, South Brisbane (2 members)
3. Nominations: 16 August (10 August for Bowen). Polling: 23 August. Electorates: Bowen, Leichhardt (2 members), Stanley (2 members)
4. Nominations: 18 August. Polling: 21 August. Electorates: Bulimba, Clermont, Fassifern, Gympie, Maranoa, Moreton, Northern Downs, Townsville, Wide Bay (2 members)
5. Nominations: 4 September (11 September for Carnarvon, 18 September for Drayton & Toowoomba, Warwick). Polling: 1 October. Electorates: Burnett, Carnarvon, Darling Downs (2 members), Drayton & Toowoomba (2 members), Warwick
6. Nominations: 4 September. Polling: 5 October. Electorates: Balonne, Burke, Gregory, Kennedy (2 members), Mitchell, Warrego
7. Nominations: 11 September. Polling: 30 October. Electorates: Cook (2 members)

== See also ==
- Members of the Queensland Legislative Assembly, 1883–1888
