= John Hamilton (Queensland politician) =

Australian politician

Member of the Queensland Legislative Assembly for Gympie
- In office 15 November 1878 – 7 September 1883
- Preceded by: James Kidgell
- Succeeded by: William Smyth

Member of the Queensland Legislative Assembly for Cook
- In office 30 October 1883 – 27 August 1904 Serving with Frederick Cooper, Thomas Campbell, Charles Hill
- Preceded by: John Walsh
- Succeeded by: John Hargreaves

Personal details
- Born: John Dinwoodie; 19 August 1841 Melbourne, Colony of New South Wales
- Died: 7 December 1916 (aged 75) Brisbane, Queensland, Australia
- Resting place: Toowong Cemetery
- Party: Ministerialist
- Occupation: Gold miner, Amateur doctor

John Hamilton (19 August 1841 – 7 December 1916), also known as John Dinwoodie, was an Australian politician.

== Early life ==
He was born in Melbourne to saddler John Dinwoodie and Janet, née McFarlane. He was sent to a private tutor in England before travelling to Rockhampton with the intention to become a pastoralist. He instead became a gold miner at the Calliope gold rush and moved to Gympie in 1867, where he became a magistrate under the name John Hamilton. He also practiced as a doctor despite his lack of qualifications, and in 1877 was a surgeon to the hospital at the Hodgkinson gold rush, where he attracted publicity with a public dispute with the local warden and a successful defamation case after allegations that he seduced the daughter of a friend of the local editor.

== Politics ==
In 1878 he was elected to the Legislative Assembly of Queensland for Gympie and supported Thomas McIlwraith's conservative group. In 1883 he changed seat to Cook, winning the election amid allegations of vote rigging.

Hamilton supported the North Queensland separatist movement and continued to support McIlwraith's conservative successors, becoming a significant but occasionally rebellious backbencher, successfully opposing the attempted reduction of parliamentary salaries in 1893 and defeating the nomination of Alfred Cowley as Speaker in 1899. In 1903 he lost his post as government whip and in 1904 lost his seat to a Labour candidate.

== Later life ==
Following his defeat he retired, and died in 1916 at the Royal Brisbane Hospital, having never married and was buried at Toowong Cemetery.

Parliament of Queensland
Preceded by James Kidgell	Member for Gympie; 1878–1883	Succeeded by William Smyth
Preceded by John Walsh	Member for Cook; 1883–1904; Served alongside: Frederick Cooper, Thomas Campbell, Charles Hill	Succeeded by John Hargreaves
