= Joshua Josephson =

Australian politician

Joshua Frey Josephson (1815 – 26 January 1892) was a judge and politician in colonial New South Wales, Solicitor-General of New South Wales 1868 to 1869.

Josephson was born in Hamburg, Germany, the son of Jacob Josephson and his wife Emma Wilson, a widow née Moss. Josephson arrived in New South Wales in 1820.

Josephson was elected a member for Braidwood in the New South Wales Legislative Assembly on 13 December 1864, a seat he held until 3 September 1869. He was appointed Solicitor-General of New South Wales from 27 October 1868 to 9 September 1869 in the 2nd government of John Robertson. He then became a District Court Judge.

Josephson died in Bellevue Hill, New South Wales on 26 January 1892. He was survived by four sons and eight daughters of his first wife, a daughter of his second wife Katerina Frederica née Schiller (married April 1868, died 1884), and by his third wife Elizabeth Geraldine, née Brenan.

New South Wales Legislative Assembly
Preceded by Henry Milford	Member for Braidwood; 1864–1869	Succeeded by Michael Kelly
Political offices
Preceded by Robert Isaacs	Solicitor General; 1868 – 1869	Succeeded by Julian Salomons
