= Francis Beattie (Queensland politician) =

Australian politician

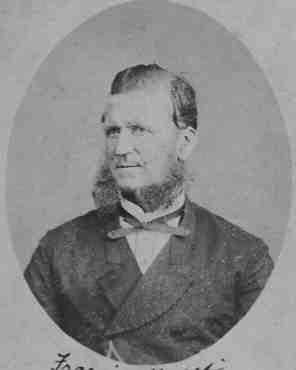

Member of the Queensland Legislative Assembly for Fortitude Valley
- In office 25 February 1874 – 26 November 1878
- Preceded by: Charles Lilley
- Succeeded by: Ratcliffe Pring
- In office 28 May 1879 – 16 April 1886 Serving with John McMaster
- Preceded by: Ratcliffe Pring
- Succeeded by: Samuel Brooks

Personal details
- Born: Francis Beattie; 29 August 1829 Dumfries, Scotland
- Died: 16 April 1886 (aged 64) Brisbane, Queensland, Australia
- Resting place: Toowong Cemetery
- Spouse: Janet Ross (m.1850 d.1887)
- Occupation: Hatter

Francis Beattie (29 August 1829 – 16 April 1886) was a hatter and member of the Queensland Legislative Assembly.

== Biography ==
Beattie was born in Dumfries, Scotland to parents Francis Beattie and his wife Susannah (née Hannah). He attended school in Carlisle, Cumberland and became a sailor as a boy. In 1849, whilst in a new Zealand port, there was a disturbance amongst the crew and the captain of the ship refused to proceed but Beattie took charge and navigated the vessel to Port Phillip where he gained work as a pilot. During the Canoona gold rush he sailed to Keppel Bay and later visited Brisbane. He finally settled in Brisbane in 1862, arriving on the Maryborough.

In 1850 he married Janet Ross (died 1887) in Brisbane, and together had five sons and five daughters. A member of the Grand United Order of Oddfellows, he died April 1886. His funeral proceeded from his Bowen Hills residence to the Toowong Cemetery.

== Political career ==
Beattie was an alderman in the Brisbane Municipal Council from 1868 until 1871 and then 1873 until 1874. He was appointed Chairman of the Booroodabin Divisional Board and President of the Joint Board of the United Municipality. He was also superintendent of the Brisbane fire brigade from 1870 until 1882.

He was also the member for Fortitude Valley in the Queensland Parliament from 1874 until his 1878 and 1879 until his death in 1886.

Parliament of Queensland
Preceded by Charles Lilley	Member for Fortitude Valley; 1874–1878	Succeeded by Ratcliffe Pring
Preceded by Ratcliffe Pring	Member for Fortitude Valley; 1879–1886; Served alongside: John McMaster	Succeeded by Samuel Brooks
