= Merion Moriarty =

Australian politician

Merion Marshall Moriarty
- Born: 1794; County Cork, Ireland
- Died: 10 January 1864 (aged 70); New South Wales
- Education: University of Edinburgh
- Spouse: Annie Orpen (1816-1864)
- Children: Edward Moriarty; Abram Moriarty
- Parent(s): Sylverius Moriarty; Lydia Hinton
- Relatives: William Moriarty
- Engineering career
- Discipline: politician

Merion Marshall Moriarty (1794 – 10 January 1864) was an Irish-born Australian politician.

He was born in County Cork to Vice-Admiral Sylverius Moriarty and Lydia Hinton. He joined the Royal Navy in 1807, travelling to Copenhagen, the Mediterranean and the West Indies. In 1814 he was promoted lieutenant, and he retired in 1815. On 15 October 1816 he married Anne Orpen, with whom he had nine children. He studied medicine at the University of Edinburgh, qualifying in 1821, and practised at Dublin. In 1843 he migrated to New South Wales to serve as portmaster and harbourmaster; he retired in 1857. In 1860 he was elected to the New South Wales Legislative Assembly for Braidwood; he held the seat until his death in Sydney in 1864. His son Abram briefly represented New England and Macleay in 1858.

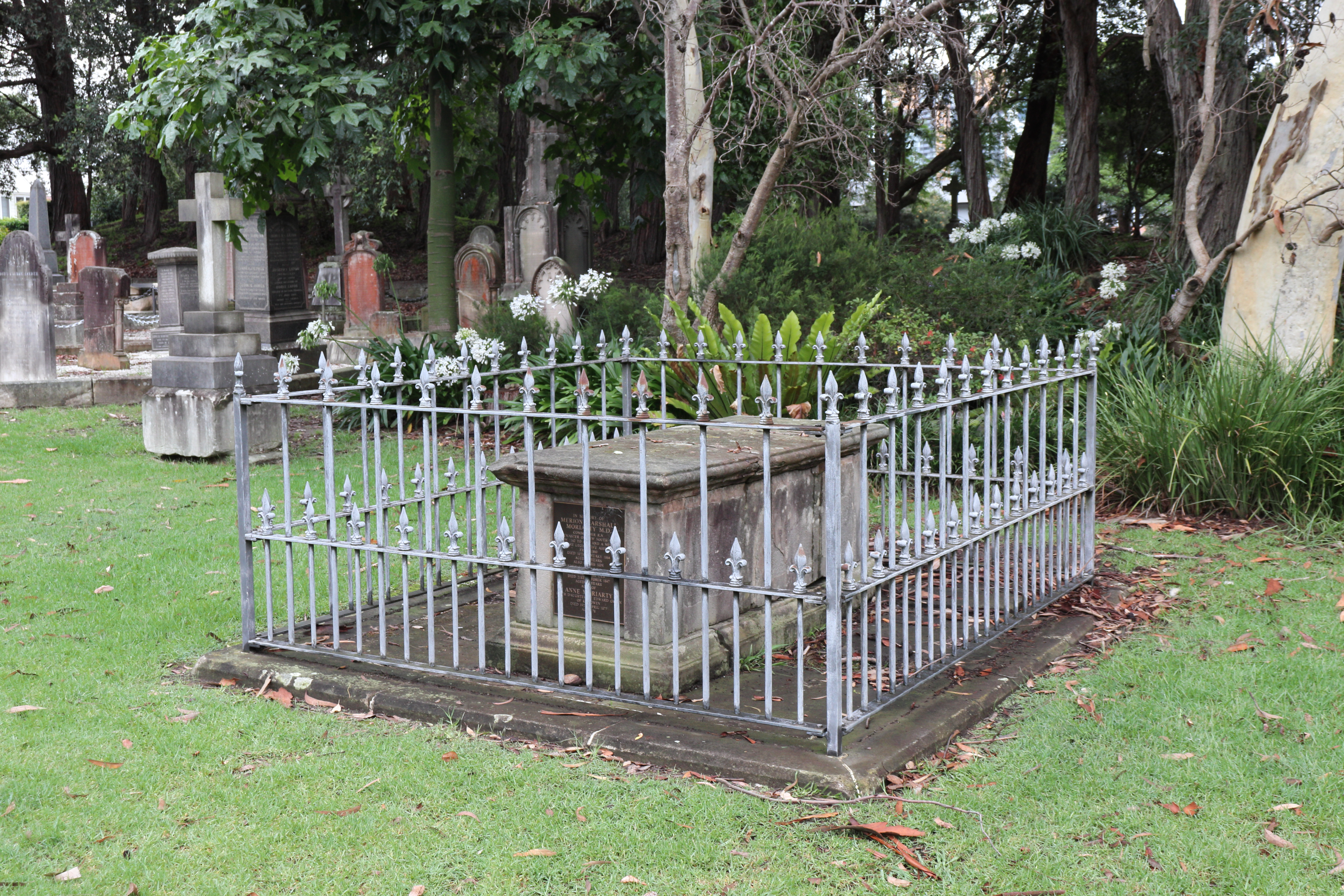
Moriarty's grave

New South Wales Legislative Assembly
Preceded by Frederick Cooper	Member for Braidwood; 1860–1864	Succeeded by Henry Milford
