= Edward Greville (Australian politician) =

Australian politician

Edward Greville (1822 – 9 July 1903) was a politician in colonial New South Wales (a state of Australia from 1901).

Greville was born in Bristol, England, the son of Charles Greville and his wife Agnes, née Cole and emigrated to Victoria (Australia) around 1852. Around 1853 he moved to New South Wales.

Greville was a member for Braidwood in the New South Wales Legislative Assembly from 17 October 1870 to 9 November 1880. He was subsequently appointed Commissioner of Land Titles for that colony. He originated and was the editor of the "Yearbook of Australia," a standard work of reference on all matters relating to Australia. On 30 August 1892 he was summoned to the New South Wales Legislative Council by the third Dibbs ministry, a position he held until his death.

New South Wales Legislative Assembly
Preceded by Michael Kelly	Member for Braidwood; 1870–1880	Succeeded by Alexander Ryrie
