= Henry Milford =

Australian politician in Queensland and New South Wales (1833–1888)

Member of the New South Wales Legislative Assembly for Braidwood
- In office 3 February 1864 – 10 November 1864
- Preceded by: Merion Moriarty
- Succeeded by: Joshua Josephson

Member of the Queensland Legislative Assembly for Rockhampton
- In office 6 December 1869 – 7 June 1870
- Preceded by: Archibald Archer
- Succeeded by: Alexander Fyfe

Personal details
- Born: Henry John Bede Milford; 1 January 1833 Clifton, Bristol, England
- Died: 29 February 1888 (aged 55) Charters Towers, Queensland, Australia
- Resting place: Charters Towers Pioneer Cemetery
- Spouse: Catherine Charlotte Dick (m.1856 d.1884)
- Occupation: Solicitor

Henry John Bede Milford (1 January 1833 – 29 February 1888) was a politician in Queensland, Australia. He was a Member of both the New South Wales Legislative Assembly and the Queensland Legislative Assembly.

== Early life and career ==
Born in England the youngest son of Samuel Milford, Milford moved to Sydney, Australia, with his parents in 1843. He became an articled clerk before being admitted as a solicitor in 1855. He practised in Sydney until 1867. He was married to Catherine Charlotte Dick and had three sons and a daughter. Their son Ernest Alexander Milford (19 December 1858 – 2 October 1942), was a lawyer in Queensland and New South Wales.

== Politics ==
He represented the electoral district of Braidwood in the New South Wales Legislative Assembly from 3 February 1864 to 10 November 1864.

He represented the electoral district of Rockhampton from 6 December 1869 to 7 June 1870. Winning the seat in a by-election, he resigned before ever taking his seat.

== Later life ==
Milford died in hospital on 29 February 1888, according to the Charters Towers Daily Herald (2 March 1888), of "excess drink and exposure".

Parliament of New South Wales
Preceded by Merion Moriarty	Member for Braidwood; 1864–1864	Succeeded by Joshua Josephson
Parliament of Queensland
Preceded by Archibald Archer	Member for Rockhampton; 1869–1870	Succeeded by Alexander Fyfe
