= Frederick Augustus Cooper =

Politician from New South Wales, Australia

Frederick Cooper

Member of the New South Wales Legislative Assembly for Braidwood
- In office 20 June 1859 – 14 July 1860
- Preceded by: New seat
- Succeeded by: Merion Moriarty

Member of the Queensland Legislative Assembly for Cook
- In office 5 December 1878 – 4 March 1884 Serving with John Walsh, John Hamilton
- Preceded by: New seat
- Succeeded by: Thomas Campbell

Personal details
- Born: Frederick Augustus Cooper; 8 August 1834 Sydney, New South Wales, Australia
- Died: 12 November 1908 (aged 74) Melbourne, Victoria, Australia
- Resting place: Boroondara General Cemetery
- Spouse: Margaret Dalton Watson
- Occupation: Barrister

Frederick Augustus Cooper (8 August 1834 – 12 November 1908) was an Australian politician who was a Member of both the New South Wales Legislative Assembly, and the Queensland Legislative Assembly.

== Personal ==
Cooper was born in Sydney to Robert and Sarah May Cooper. He married Margaret Dalton Watson in Bendigo, Victoria, Australia on 16 April 1883, the daughter of mining magnate John Boyd Watson, with whom he had six daughters.

== Career ==
Cooper was 24 when he was elected to the New South Wales Legislative Assembly as the member for Braidwood at the 1859 election, but served for only one year before resigning, to accept an appointment as a sub-commissioner of goldfields. He was initially at Kiandra, however an inquiry had found he had committed errors, including illegal acts, as a result of his inexperience and he was transferred to Araluen. In the Legislative Assembly Bowie Wilson, the member for Goldfields South, criticised the then Secretary for Lands, John Robertson for not dismissing Cooper. Cooper resigned as sub-commissioner shortly after Wilson had been appointed Secretary for Lands. Cooper opposed Wilson at the Goldfields South by-election in November 1863, but received less than 10% of the vote.

He was called to the bar in New South Wales and Queensland in 1864. He was admitted to the bar in Victoria in 1883 and also practised in New Zealand.

He was a practicing barrister in Cooktown in North Queensland from 1874 and on 5 March 1878 was elected to the Queensland Legislative Assembly as the member for Cook, which included Cooktown. He served until 4 March 1884 when his re-election in October 1863 was overturned by the Committee of Elections and Qualifications, following allegations of "ballot stuffing", as there were too many votes cast at the California Gully and Halpin's Creek polling stations given the number of electors.

== Death ==
Cooper died in Melbourne on 12 November 1908.

New South Wales Legislative Assembly
New seat	Member for Braidwood; 1859–1860	Succeeded by Merion Moriarty
Parliament of Queensland
New seat	Member for Cook; 1878–1884; Served alongside: John Walsh, John Hamilton	Succeeded by Thomas Campbell
