= Michael Kelly (Australian politician) =

Australian politician

Michael William Kelly was an Australian politician.

He was a storekeeper at Braidwood before entering politics. In 1869 he was elected in a by-election to the New South Wales Legislative Assembly for Braidwood. He was re-elected at the general election later that year, but this result was overturned due to electoral irregularities and he was defeated at the subsequent by-election in 1870.

New South Wales Legislative Assembly
Preceded by Joshua Josephson	Member for Braidwood; 1869–1870	Succeeded by Edward Greville
