= Electoral district of Braidwood =

State electoral district of New South Wales, Australia

Braidwood was an electoral district of the Legislative Assembly in the Australian state of New South Wales, one of 62 new districts created established under the Electoral Act 1858 (NSW), in the 1858 redistribution. Braidwood was named after and included the town of Braidwood. It replaced parts of the districts of United Counties of Murray and St Vincent and the Southern Boroughs. In 1904 it was largely absorbed into the district of Queanbeyan. The balance of the district went to the new district of The Clyde.

== Members for Braidwood ==
Member	Party	Period
Frederick Cooper	None	1859–1860
Merion Moriarty	None	1860–1864
Henry Milford	None	1864–1864
Joshua Josephson	None	1864–1869
Michael Kelly	None	1869–1870
Edward Greville	None	1870–1880
Alexander Ryrie	None	1880–1887
Alexander Ryrie	Protectionist	1887–1891
Austin Chapman	Protectionist	1891–1901
Albert Chapman	Progressive	1901–1904

== Election results ==
1901 New South Wales state election: Braidwood
Party	Candidate	Votes	%	±%
Progressive	Albert Chapman	640	43.2	−29.9
Independent Liberal	Richard Higgins	483	32.6	
Independent Liberal	Patrick O'Brien	223	15.0	
Independent Liberal	Frederick Gordon	70	4.7	
Independent Liberal	Ebenezer Henry	46	3.1	
Independent Liberal	Alexander Fraser	15	1.0	
Independent	Walter Horberry	3	0.2	
Independent	Bartholomew O'Sullivan	2	0.1	
Ind. Progressive	John Kenny	1	0.07	
Total formal votes		1,483	95.6	−3.5
Informal votes		69	4.5	+3.5
Turnout		1,552	71.1	+18.7
Progressive hold				
