= Thomas Wilson (Queensland politician) =

Australian politician (1865–1933)

The Honourable Thomas Wilson
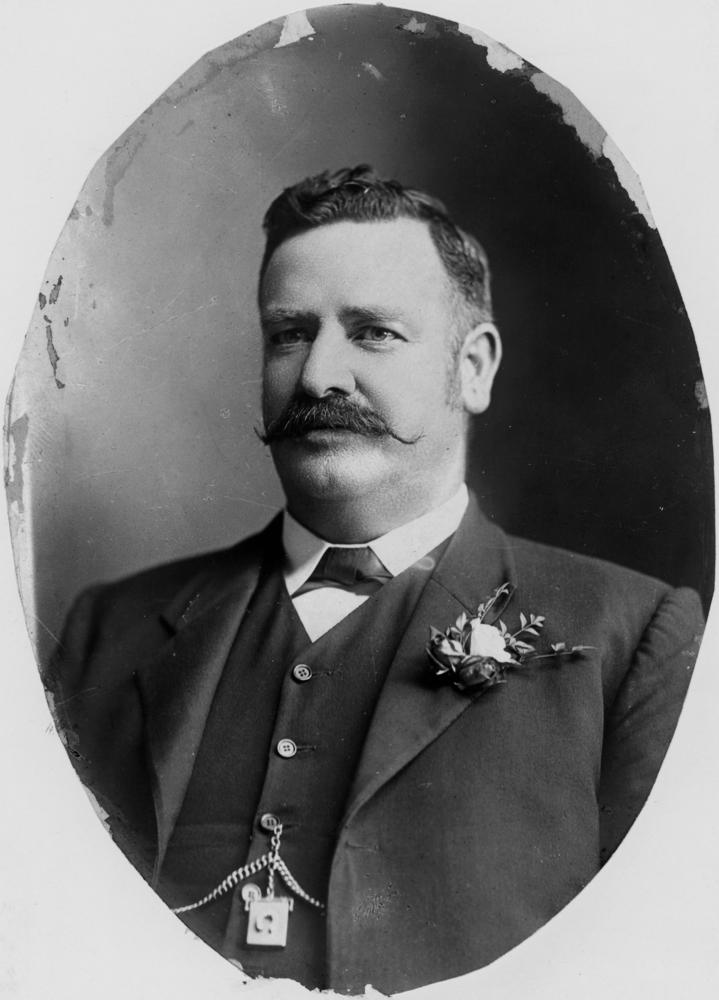
- Thomas Wilson - 1915

36th Mayor of Brisbane
- In office 1909–1909
- Preceded by: Charles Buchanan
- Succeeded by: John Hetherington
- In office 1925–1925
- Preceded by: Maurice Barry
- Succeeded by: William Jolly

Member of the Queensland Legislative Assembly for Fortitude Valley
- In office 1 April 1916 – 19 May 1933
- Preceded by: David Bowman
- Succeeded by: Samuel Brassington

Personal details
- Born: Thomas Wilson; 5 May 1865 Riddells Creek, Victoria, Australia
- Died: 19 May 1933 (aged 68) Brisbane, Queensland, Australia
- Resting place: Toowong Cemetery
- Party: Labor
- Spouse: Emma Brown (m.1890 d.1952)
- Occupation: Miner

Thomas Wilson (5 May 1865 – 19 May 1933) was an Australian miner and a member of the Queensland Legislative Assembly. He was also Mayor of Brisbane in 1909 and 1925.

== Biography ==
Wilson was born in Riddells Creek, Victoria, to parents James Wilson and his wife Mary (née McLean). He was educated in Riddells Creek. As a young man, he left home to work in the primary industries and later as a shearer in the Riverina district. He then worked at the Cobar copper mine and came to Queensland in 1884 where he invested in mining and pastoral pursuits.

In 1890 he married Emma Brown (died 1952) in Rockhampton and together had two sons and two daughters. He was a keen sportsman and a member of the Tattersalls Club. Wilson died in office in May 1933, and was accorded a state funeral which proceeded from his New Farm residence to the Toowong Cemetery.

== Public career ==
Wilson was associated with the Labour Party from its very early days of existence. He was an alderman on the Brisbane City Council, winning the ward of Merthyr in 1905 and holding it for the next sixteen years. During that time he was a member of the Brisbane Metropolitan Water and Sewerage Board. In 1909 he was Mayor of Brisbane and held the distinction of welcoming Lord Kitchener when he visited Brisbane on New Year's Day, 1910. In 1925 he was once again Mayor for a short period.

Following the death of David Bowman in 1916, Wilson won the seat of Fortitude Valley in the Queensland Legislative Assembly. He held the seat until his death in 1933, and was Minister for Public Instruction from 1925 until 1929. As minister he initiated many reforms for the welfare of school children and a lasting tribute to his name was the Wilson Ophthalmic School at Windsor. The Wilson Hospital was a specialised facility where eye diseases in children from country Queensland could be diagnosed and treated.

Civic offices
Preceded by Charles Buchanan	Mayor of Brisbane; 1909	Succeeded by John Hetherington
Preceded by Maurice Barry	Mayor of Brisbane; 1925	Succeeded by William Jolly
Parliament of Queensland
Preceded by David Bowman	Member for Fortitude Valley; 1916–1933	Succeeded by Samuel Brassington
