= Thomas Proe =

Australian politician (1852-1922)

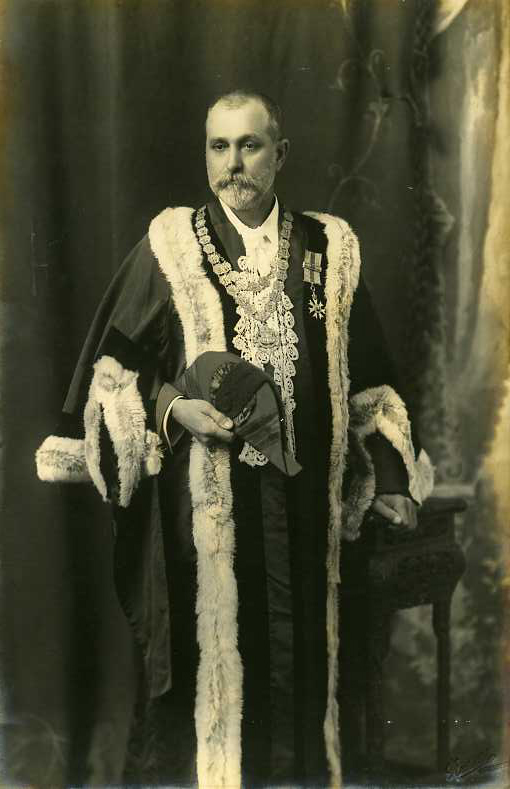
- Thomas Proe in his mayoral robes – 1905

30th Mayor of Brisbane
- In office 1901–1901
- Preceded by: James Robinson
- Succeeded by: Leslie Corrie
- In office 1905–1905
- Preceded by: Thomas Rees
- Succeeded by: John Crase

Personal details
- Born: Thomas Proe; 1852 Wigan, Lancashire, England
- Died: 17 December 1922 (aged 69 or 70) Brisbane, Queensland, Australia
- Resting place: Toowong Cemetery
- Spouse: Mary Strasburg (m.1881 d.1924)
- Occupation: Engineer, Publican

Thomas Proe (1852–1922) was an alderman and mayor of Brisbane, Queensland, Australia.

== Personal life ==
Thomas Proe was born in 1852 at Wigan, Lancashire, England, the son of Thomas Proe and Jane Beckman.

He came to Queensland in 1876 and married Mary Strasburg (daughter of Frederick Strasburg and Frederica Mundt) in Brisbane in 1881. They had seven children:

- Frederick Thomas (born 1882, died 1886)
- Ethel Mary (born 1884, died 1888)
- Martha Jane Jubilee (born 1887, married John McClew MacGibbon in 1928)
- Bertha (born 1889, married Hector Marwick in 1915)
- Eveline Mary (born 1893)
- Victor Thomas (born 1897, married Mabel Annie Sinnamon in 1921)
- Cara May Gladys (born 1901, married Lancelot Walter Trout in 1925)

Proe died on 17 December 1922 at his residence "Wyralla", Mark street, New Farm, aged 71 years. He is buried in Toowong Cemetery. His wife died in 1924 and is buried with him.

== Business life ==
Thomas Proe trained as an engineer in England, but in Brisbane he became a publican. He owned the Osborne Hotel and later Royal George Hotel, Ann Street, Fortitude Valley.

== Public life ==
Thomas Proe was served as an alderman of the Brisbane Municipal Council from 1895 to 1905. He was mayor of the Brisbane Municipal Council in 1901 and again in 1905 as mayor of the Brisbane City Council (Brisbane having become a city in 1903). His service to the council, included

- Finance Committee 1895, 1899, 1902, 1904
- Legislative Committee 1895, 1899, 1902, 1903
- Works Committee 1896, 1900–1903, 1905
- Parks Committee 1896, 1900–1901
- Health Committee 1900–1901
- Special (Ferries) Committee 1900–1901
- Building Act Committee 1901
- Special Sewerage Committee 1905
- Member of Board of Waterworks 1905

During his term as mayor, Brisbane was in 1901 visited by the Duke and Duchess of Cornwall and York (later King George V and Queen Mary). In recognition of his work for that occasion, he was appointed a Companion of the Order of St Michael and St George (CMG) 15 May 1901.

Thomas Proe was president for some years of the Licensed Victuallers' Association, a member of the Brisbane Metropolitan Water Board, and a member of the Amalgamated Society of Engineers.

He was also a member of the Masons.

== See also ==
- List of mayors and lord mayors of Brisbane
