= Mayor Porter =

Mayor Porter may refer to:

- John Clinton Porter, 33rd mayor of Los Angeles from 1929 to 1933.
- Robert Porter (mayor)
- James E. Porter (1857–1946), mayor of Kansas City, Kansas from 1910 to 1913.
- Nelson Davis Porter (1863-1961), mayor of Ottawa, Canada from 1915 to 1916
- DeForest Porter (1840–1889) mayor of Phoenix, Arizona Territory
