= Doggetts Cottage =

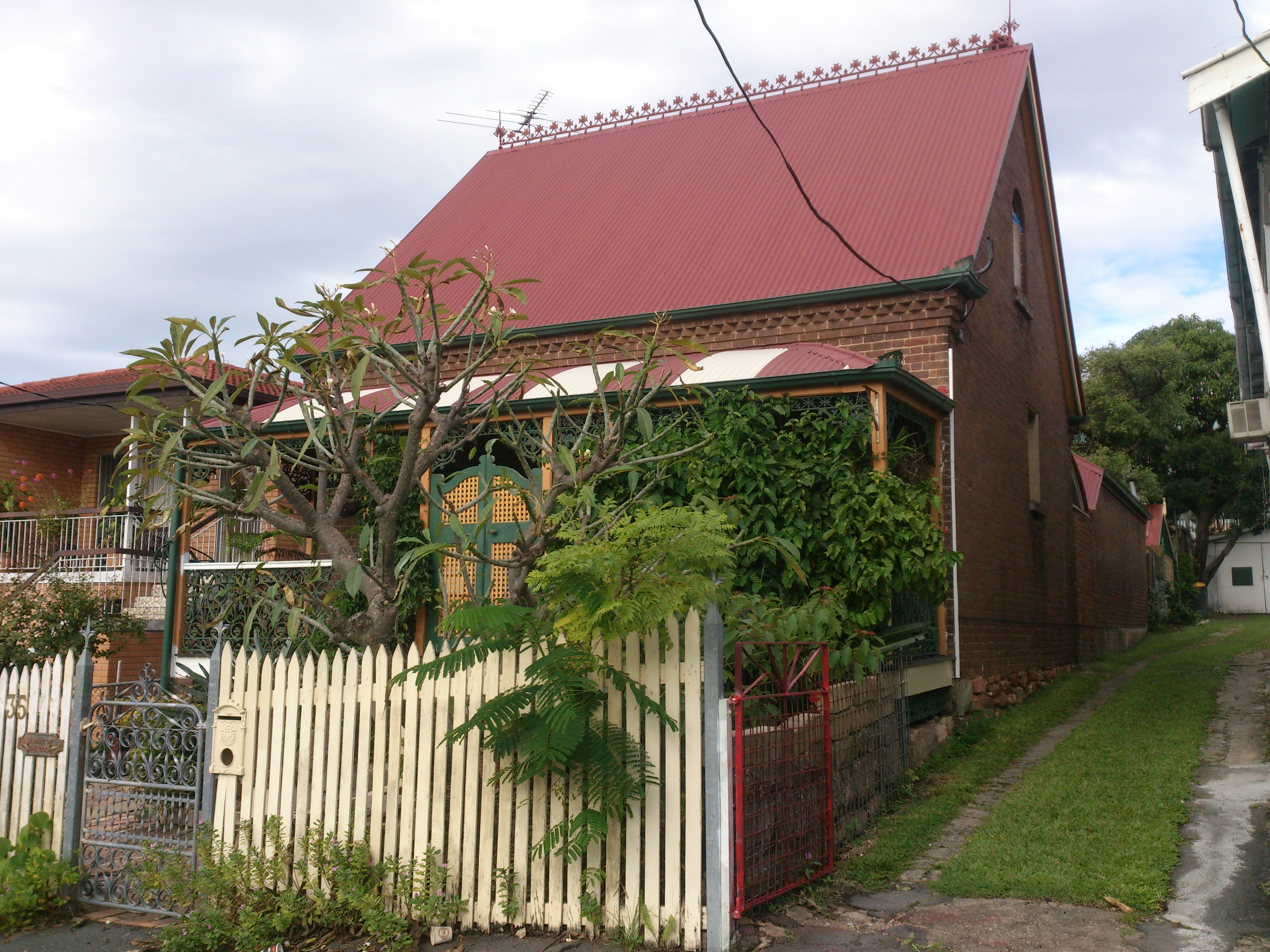

- Location within Queensland Location within Australia
- 27.4604°S 153.0389°E
- Location: 33 Arthur Street, Fortitude Valley, City of Brisbane, Queensland, Australia

History
- Design period: 1870s–1890s (late 19th century)
- Built: c. 1880
- Built for: Harry Doggett

Queensland Heritage Register
- Official name: Doggetts Cottage
- Type: state heritage (built)
- Designated: 21 October 1992
- Reference no.: 600258
- Significant period: 1880s (fabric); 1880s–1920s (historical)
- Significant components: kitchen/kitchen house, stables, well, attic, residential accommodation – main house
- Builders: Harry Doggett

Doggetts Cottage is a heritage-listed cottage at 33 Arthur Street, Fortitude Valley, City of Brisbane, Queensland, Australia. It was built c. 1880 by Harry Doggett. It was added to the Queensland Heritage Register on 21 October 1992.

== History ==
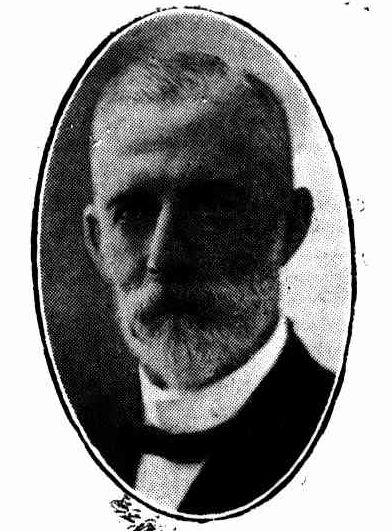
Harry Doggett, mayor of Brisbane 1913

This single-storeyed brick house was built about 1880 by Harry Doggett, bricklayer and builder, as his family home. Doggett was active in civic affairs and was elected mayor of the Town of Brisbane in 1913.

Although he died in 1927, the house remained in the family until the 1970s. From 1983 to 1988 it was used as offices for the Martin Agency who carried out alterations. The roofspace was opened up and a new kitchen and bathroom were installed on the verandah. The stables were also enlarged. The property has now returned to its original use as a family home.

== Description ==
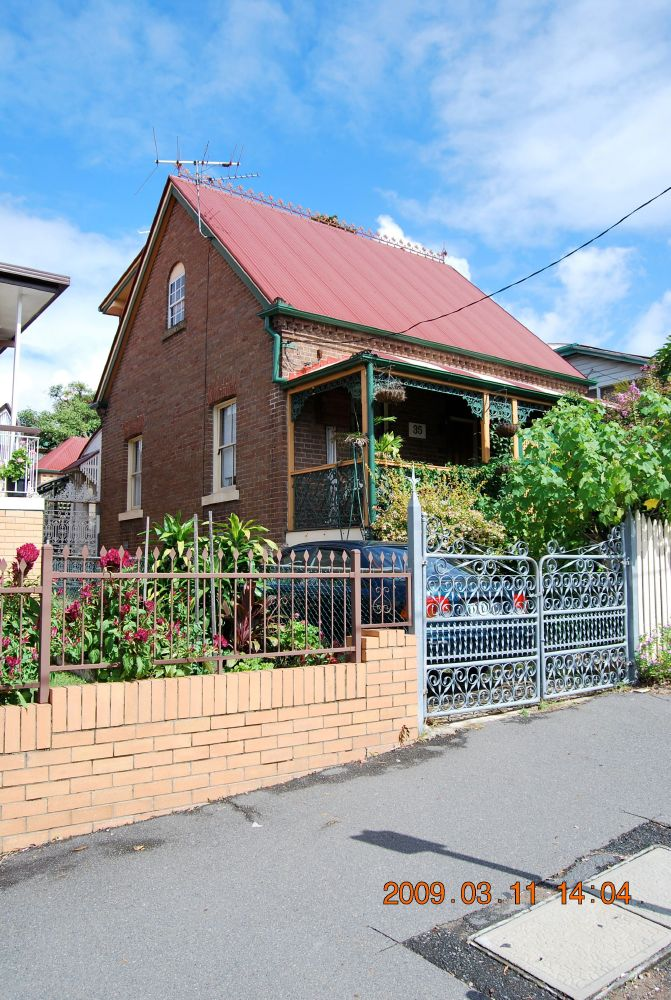
Doggetts Cottage, 2009

Built on tuff foundations, Doggetts Cottage is a four-roomed single-storeyed brick house with a detached kitchen wing at the rear. It has a steeply pitched gable roof of corrugated iron.

The convex roofed verandahs across the front and back have square timber posts and stick balusters. The exterior walls exhibit fine brickwork and decorative features such as a string course below the eaves in diagonally laid bricks.

The interior consists of four main rooms and a new kitchen and bathroom on what was the rear verandah leading to the kitchen wing, which is now used for other purposes. Internal walls and ceilings are plastered and the original cedar joinery includes a mantelpiece. A modern staircase leads to the attic in the roof space.

The original timber stables are located along the rear fence line and two wells can be found in the back yard.

== Heritage listing ==
Doggetts Cottage was listed on the Queensland Heritage Register on 21 October 1992 having satisfied the following criteria.

The place is important in demonstrating the evolution or pattern of Queensland's history.

As being typical of houses built by artisans as their own home, demonstrating both the skill of the master builder and pride in his craft.

The cottage's character is enhanced by the ornate designs, workmanship, and prestigious materials used.

For the surviving stables, wells and kitchen wing which combine to provide a rare glimpse of a tradesman's domestic environment in the late nineteenth century.

As the family home Mayor Doggett after whom the neighbouring street was named.

The place demonstrates rare, uncommon or endangered aspects of Queensland's cultural heritage.

For the surviving stables, wells and kitchen wing which combine to provide a rare glimpse of a tradesman's domestic environment in the late nineteenth century.

The place is important in demonstrating the principal characteristics of a particular class of cultural places.

As being typical of houses built by artisans as their own home, demonstrating both the skill of the master builder and pride in his craft.

The Cottage features timber construction, detailed workmanship and decorative elements typical of the period.

The place is important because of its aesthetic significance.

For the high quality materials, workmanship and decorative detailing evident throughout, enhancing its cottage character.

The place has a special association with the life or work of a particular person, group or organisation of importance in Queensland's history.

As the family home of Mayor Doggett after whom the neighbouring street was named.

== See also ==
- List of mayors and lord mayors of Brisbane
