= Booroodabin Division =

Former Local Government Area

Coordinates: 27.44429°S 153.04255°E

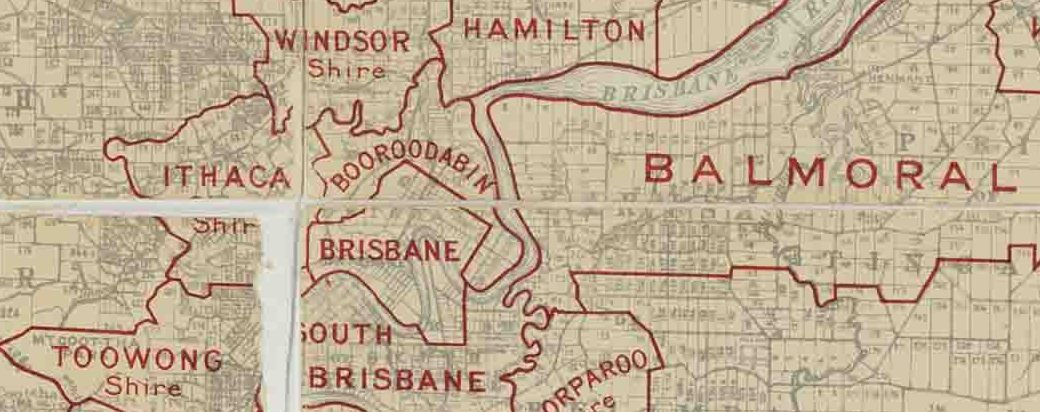
Map of Booroodabin Division and adjacent local government areas, March 1902

Booroodabin Division is a former local government area of Queensland, Australia, located in inner northern Brisbane immediately north of the Brisbane CBD today. It existed from 1879 to 1903.

== History ==
Booroodabin Division came into existence on 11 November 1879 with a population of 3462, as one of the original divisions created by the Divisional Boards Act 1879.

On 13 Jan 1903, the Booroodabin Division was abolished and absorbed into Town of Brisbane.

== Chairmen ==
From the inception of the division, the elected aldermen chose one of their number to be chairman for the ensuing year. The election normally took place in late January or February.

Year	Chairman	Notes
1880–1881	James Cowlishaw	Member of the Queensland Legislative Council from 1878–1922
1881–1886	Francis Beattie	Member for Fortitude Valley in 1874–1878 and 1879–1886
1886–1887	Andrew Dath	
1887–1888	Peter Mallon	
1888–1889	Andrew Dath	Second term
1889–1890	Peter Morrison Campbell	Campbell was reelected in the annual 1890 chairman election and then resigned the following month, citing "lack of leisure time."
1890–1891	Joseph Peirson	
1891–1892	Benjamin Robert Bale	Chairman of the Shire of Yeerongpilly in 1911–1913
1892–1894	George Down	Appointed acting chairman before the 1892 election. Mayor of Brisbane in 1915-1916
1894–1895	William Stevenson	
1895–1896	Benjamin Robert Bale	Second term
1896–1897	George Down	Second term
1897–1898	Thomas Welsby	Member for Brisbane North in 1911–1912 and Merthyr in 1912–1915
1898–1899	Andrew Dath	Third term
1899–1900	William Murray Thompson	Mayor of Brisbane in 1907
1900–1901	Thomas Welsby	Second term
1901–1902	Benjamin Robert Bale	Third term
1902–1903	George Down	Third term

== Population ==
Year	Population	Notes
1879	3,462	
1881	2,292	
1886	5,197	
1891	6,853	
1901	8,489	
