= Harry Diddams =

Australian printer and politician

Harry John Charles Diddams CMG
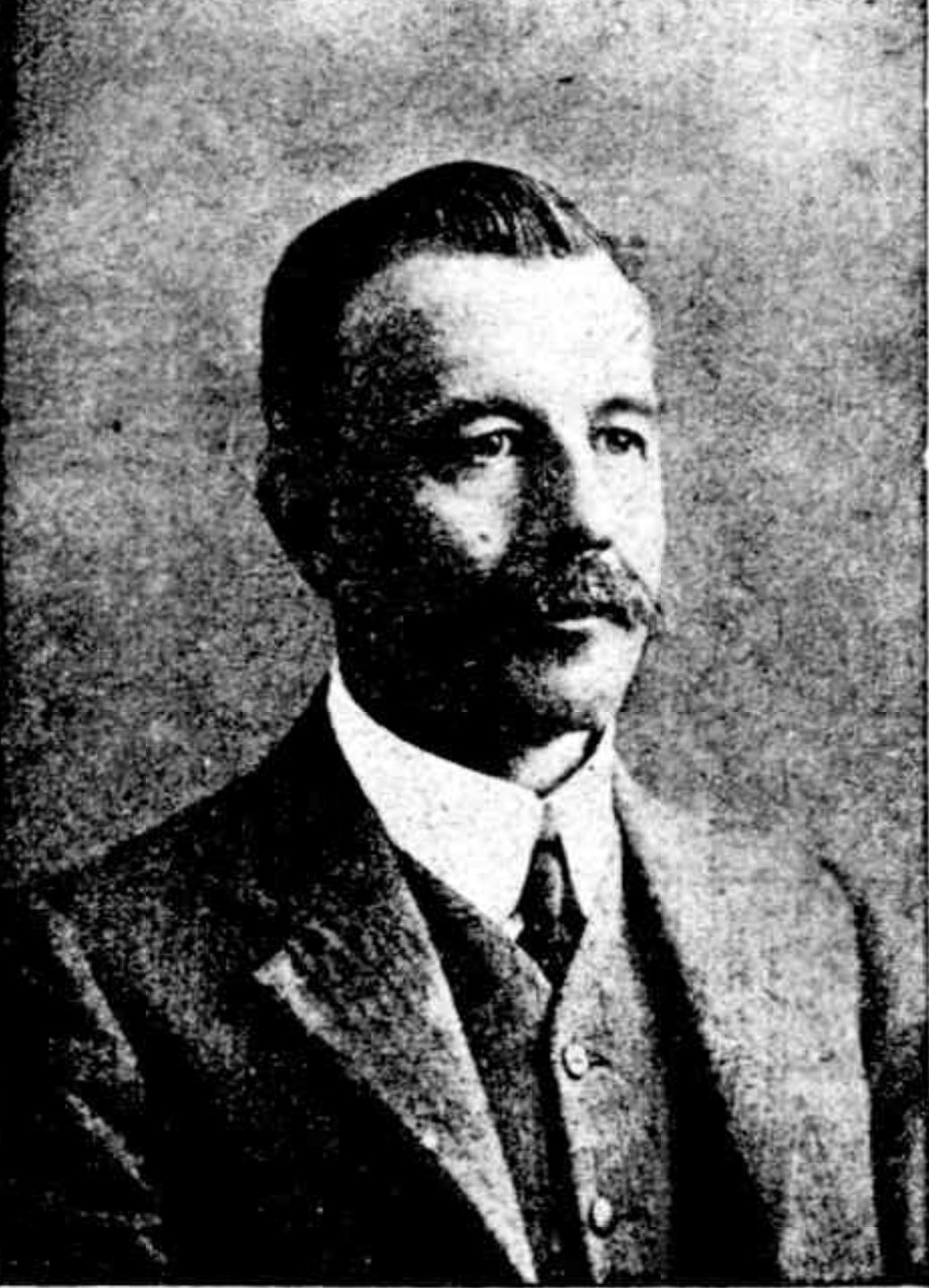
- Harry Diddams, Mayor of Brisbane, 1911

38th Mayor of Brisbane
- In office 1911 and from 1921 – 1924
- Preceded by: John Hetherington
- Succeeded by: Alfred John Raymond 1912, Maurice Barry 1924

Personal details
- Born: Harry John Charles Diddams; 26 April 1864 Coniston Cottage, Parnell, Auckland, New Zealand
- Died: 11 March 1929 (aged 73) Sydney, New South Wales, Australia
- Resting place: Toowong Cemetery, Brisbane
- Spouse: Henrietta Gibbs Hicks (m1895)
- Occupation: Master Printer, Politician

Harry John Charles Diddams CMG (26 April 1864 – 11 March 1929) was a master printer and politician in Brisbane, Queensland, Australia. He served two terms as Mayor of the City of Brisbane before its amalgamation with surrounding local authorities into Greater Brisbane in 1925.

== Family life ==
Harry John Charles Diddams was born on 26 April 1864 to John William Diddams and Lydia Mary (née Flower) at Coniston Cottage, Parnell in Auckland, New Zealand. His father was a widower when he married Lydia Flower and there was an elder son, William Henry, born 1855 in Ulverstone Registration District, Lancashire, England to John and Sarah (née Blackhall), who died in 1856. Harry was described in a report of his wedding as "the second son". New Zealand birth records indicate that he was the eldest of five children from his father's second marriage.

He married Henrietta (Hettie) Gibbs Hicks, third daughter of the late Robert McCall Hicks, on 17 April 1895 at All Saints Church, East St Kilda, Victoria.

== Employment ==
Harry served his apprenticeship as a compositor on the Auckland Star in his home city. In 1881, he moved to Melbourne where he joined the printing firm of McCarron, Bird & Co.

== Politics ==
Harry Diddams first attempt to enter local politics came in January 1907 when he opposed the sitting alderman in the South Ward of the Town of Toowong where he was living in Ashton Street. The incumbent was returned comfortably.

In August 1907, a casual vacancy arose on the Brisbane Municipal Council through the resignation of the Alderman for West Ward. Although still resident in Toowong, Diddams was qualified as the owner of a business in Brisbane's business district (Adelaide Street), was nominated by several prominent businessmen and appointed by Council. He remained an alderman from 1907–1921 and served on many of the Committees of Council. Harry Diddams served two terms as Mayor of Brisbane; first in 1911 and then 1921–1924.

The first term, during which Diddams also served as President of the Local Authorities Association of Queensland, coincided with the Coronation of King George V. When he was named a Companion of the Order of st Michael and St George in the New Year's Honours List of 1912, His Worship explained that "the citizens of Brisbane are honoured equally" and "every local authority member ... participates in the honour paid to me". A columnist on the Truth offered a more cynical view.

In 1916, Diddams' role on Council included representing the town on the ANZAC Commemoration Executive charged by the State Government with the organisation of a suitable public remembrance of the events of the previous April.

=== 'Later Rome' ===
In 1923, the city marked the centenary of the expedition of John Oxley to the Brisbane River. Then mayor, Diddams' celebrated the event with a speech in which he notably designated Brisbane to be a 'Later Rome'. An excerpt of the speech is below:

“By the kindly act of Nature our city is blessed with a site of supreme beauty, while our near environment of mountain, river, and shore, forms a very paradise of delight—a wonderland of promise. Our river is the greatest commercial river in the Commonwealth, and destined, we are convinced, to maintain its supremacy. We seem to our selves like Rome for situation, but a later Rome with a greater destiny….” —Mayor H.J. Diddams (2 December 1923)

== Later life ==
In January 1929, Harry sailed 'home' to New Zealand aboard the Aorangi to visit his sister, Mrs Fred Kenderdine, of Remuera. On the return journey to Brisbane, he fell ill and was admitted to a private hospital in Sydney where he died on 11 March 1929.

Harry Diddams' body was returned to Brisbane and on 16 March 1929 his funeral procession left from Albert Street outside the (new) Brisbane City Hall. His coffin was carried to the vehicle by former Mayors of Brisbane honouring their colleague. At Toowong Cemetery he was interred with wife Hettie and their daughter Lorna.
