= George Down =

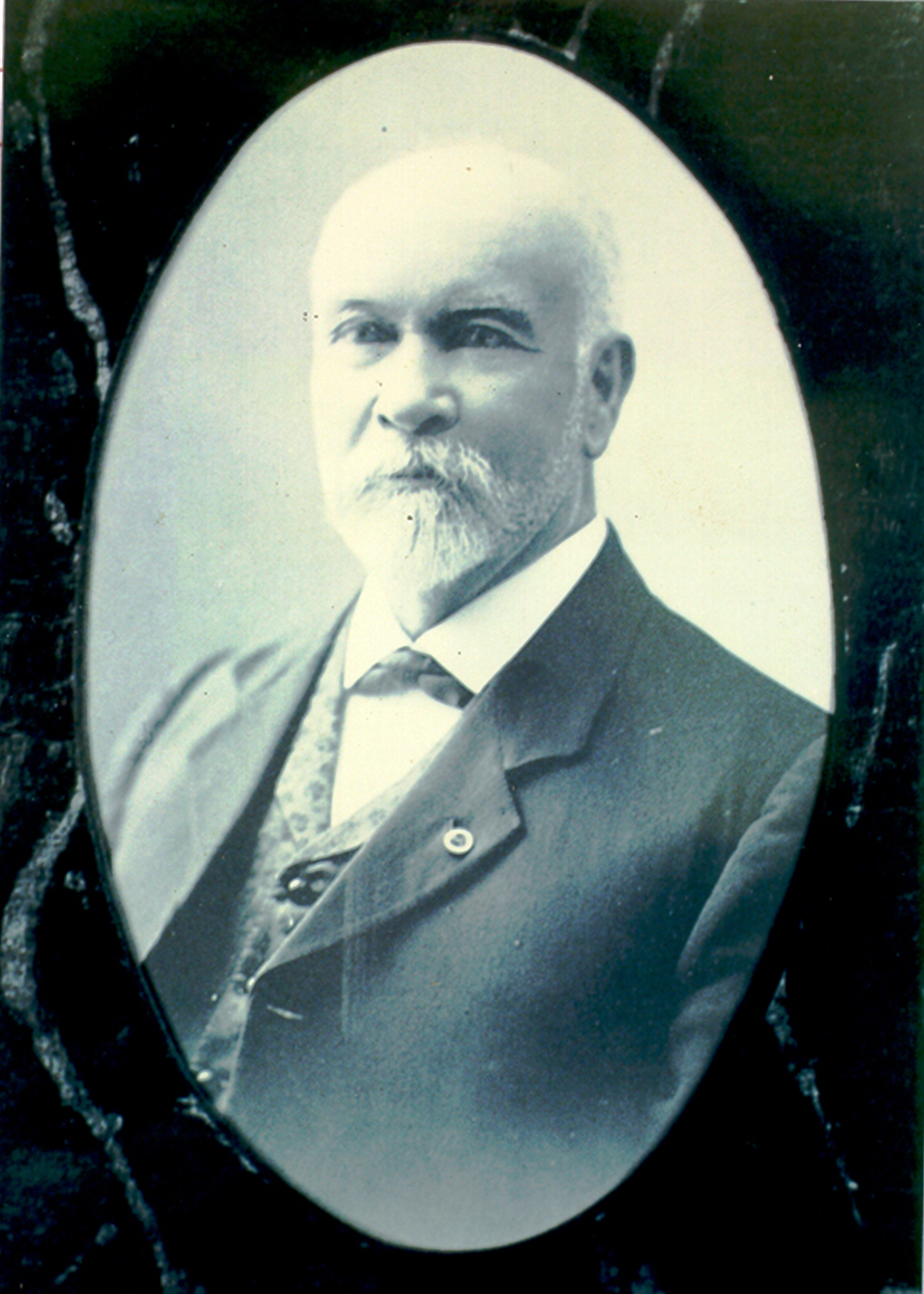
George Down Mayor of Brisbane 1915

George Down (12 July 1847 – 8 July 1934) was an accountant and politician in Brisbane, Queensland, Australia. He began his civic career when he became part of the Booroodabin Divisional Board in 1880 and remained a member 1903. In that year the board became absorbed into the Town of Brisbane. On 31 March 1903 after a legislative change the Town of Brisbane became the City of Brisbane. He was Mayor of Brisbane from 1903 to 1916.

In addition to his duties on the Brisbane City Council, he was one of the first trustees of the Brisbane Cricket Ground. He was also treasurer of the Local Authorities Association and the secretary of the Queensland Protestant Federation. George was also a very keen musician; he was choir master of the Fortitude Valley Methodist Church and "in the 80's was the pillar and mainstay of the Bowen Hills Musical Society" He conducted the Choral Union in the first Queensland inter-city Eisteddfod, which was held in Brisbane in 1888, and was treasurer of the 1913 Brisbane Eisteddfod.

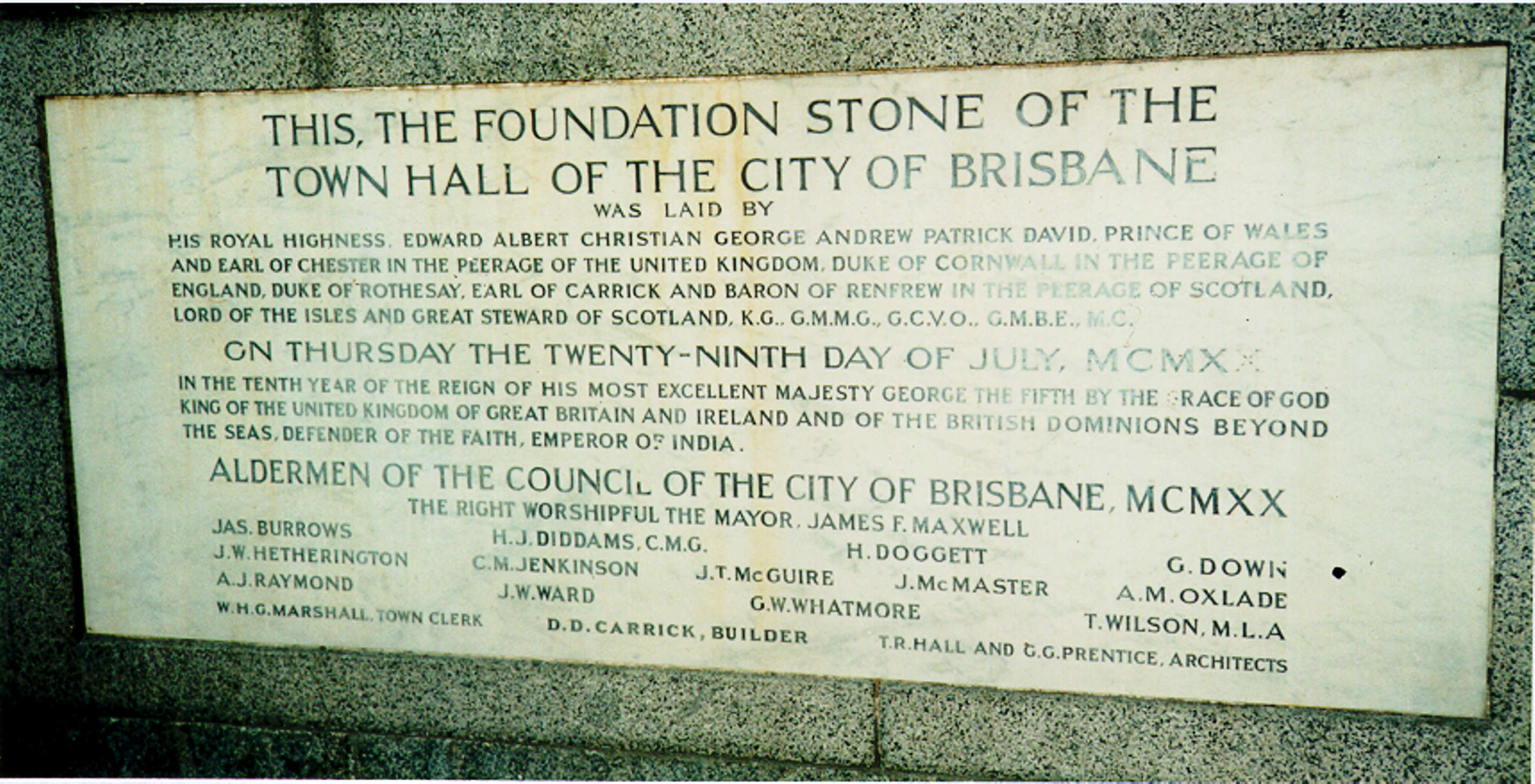
Brisbane City Hall foundation stone George Down's name appears on the right hand side

He was 87 years old when he died in July 1934.
