= Edward Baines =

Edward Baines may refer to:

- Edward Baines (1774–1848), nonconformist English newspaper editor and Member of Parliament
- Edward Baines (1800–1890), his son, also a nonconformist English newspaper editor and Member of Parliament
- Edward Joseph Baines (1815–1880), alderman and mayor of the Brisbane Municipal Council
