= 1912 New Year Honours =

George V's appointments

The New Year Honours 1912 were appointments by King George V to various orders and honours to reward and highlight good works by members of the British Empire. They were announced on 29 December 1911.

== Order of the Bath ==
=== Knight Grand Cross (GCB) ===
Military Division

- General Count Maresuke Nogi, Imperial Japanese Army. (Honorary)

=== Knight Commander (KCB) ===
Civil Division

- Sir Charles Prestwood Lucas, K.C.M.G., C.B.

=== Companion (CB) ===
Civil Division

- Major John Grey Baldwin.
- Edmund Kerchever Chambers, Esq.
- Henry Ernest Fitzwilliam Comyn, Esq.
- Sir Melville Leslie Macnaghten.
- William Francis Marwood, Esq.
- Charles Henry Lawrence Neish, Esq.
- Arthur Newsholme, Esq., M.D.
- Andrew Muter John Ogilvie, Esq.
- James Duncan Stuart Sim, Esq.
- Alfred Walter Soward, Esq.
- William Gibbs Turpin, Esq.
- Archibald Edwards Widdows, Esq.

== Order of Saint Michael and Saint George ==
=== Knight Grand Cross (GCMG) ===
- Sir George Ruthven Le Hunte, K.C.M.G., Governor and Commander-in-Chief of the Colony of Trinidad and Tobago.

=== Knight Commander (KCMG) ===
- Sir Edward Albert Stone, Knight, Lieutenant-Governor of the State of Western Australia.
- His Honour Colonel John Morison Gibson, K.C., LL.D., Lieutenant-Governor of the Province of Ontario.
- Joseph Pope, Esq., C.V.O., C.M.G., I.S.O., Under Secretary of State for External Affairs, Dominion of Canada.
- George Vandeleur Fiddes, Esq., C.B., C.M.G., Assistant Under Secretary of State, Colonial Office.
- George Townsend Fenwick, Esq., C.M.G., Unofficial Member of the Legislative Council of the Colony of Trinidad and Tobago.
- The Honourable Thomas Watt, C.M.G., Member of the House of Assembly of the Union of South Africa.
- His Highness Suleiman bin Almerhum Raja Musa, C.M.G., Sultan of Selangor. (Honorary)
- Rear-Admiral the Honourable Alexander Edward Bethell, C.M.G., Director of Naval Intelligence.

=== Companion (CMG) ===
- Thomas Cooper Boville, Esq., Deputy Minister of Finance of the Dominion of Canada.
- John Frank Brown, Esq., Member of the Provincial Council and of the Executive Committee of the Transvaal Province, Union of South Africa.
- Horace Archer Byatt, Esq., Commissioner and Commander-in-Chief for the Somaliland Protectorate.
- Douglas Graham Campbell, Esq., General Adviser to the Government of Johore.
- Harry John Charles Diddams, Esq., Mayor of the City of Brisbane.
- William Francis Joseph Fitzpatrick, Esq., Chairman of Railway Commissioners for Victoria.
- The Honourable Alexander Hean, Minister of Lands and Works of the State of Tasmania, and recently Acting Premier, of that State.
- Edbert Ansgar Hewett, Esq., Unofficial Member of the Executive and Legislative Councils of the Colony of Hong Kong.
- Major Richard Abercrombie Irvine, Provincial Commissioner, Northern Territories of the Gold Coast.
- Thomas Orr, Esq., Member of the House of Assembly of the Union of South Africa.
- Lieutenant-Colonel David Prain, C.I.E., F.R.S., Director of the Royal Botanic Gardens, Kew.
- Daniel Woodley Prowse, Esq., K.C., LL.D., Author of "A History of Newfoundland".
- Colonel Alfred William Robin, C.B., Adjutant-General to the New Zealand Military Forces.
- Tan Jiak Kim, Esq., Unofficial Member of the Legislative Council of the Straits Settlements.
- Maurice Edward Wingfield, Esq., recently Acting Colonial Secretary of the Colony of the Gambia.
- Salim bin Khalfan, Liwali of Mombasa. (Honorary)
- Milne Cheetham, Esq., Councillor of Embassy in His Majesty's Diplomatic Service attached to His Majesty's Agency and Consulate-General at Cairo.
- James Frederick Roberts, Esq., His Majesty's Consul-General at Barcelona.
- Donald Andreas Cameron, Esq., His Majesty's Consul-General at Alexandria.
- Henry Fountain, Esq., Principal Clerk in the Board of Trade.
- James McIver MacLeod, Esq., His Majesty's Consul at Fez.

== Royal Victorian Order ==
=== Knight Commander (KCVO) ===
- The Hon. Sidney Robert Greville, C.V.O., C.B.
- The Hon. Arthur Henry John Walsh, C.V.O.

=== Member, 4th Class ===
- Bertram Mackennal, Esq., A.R.A.
