= Alfred John Raymond =

Australian merchant and politician (1856–1935)

Alfred Raymond JP
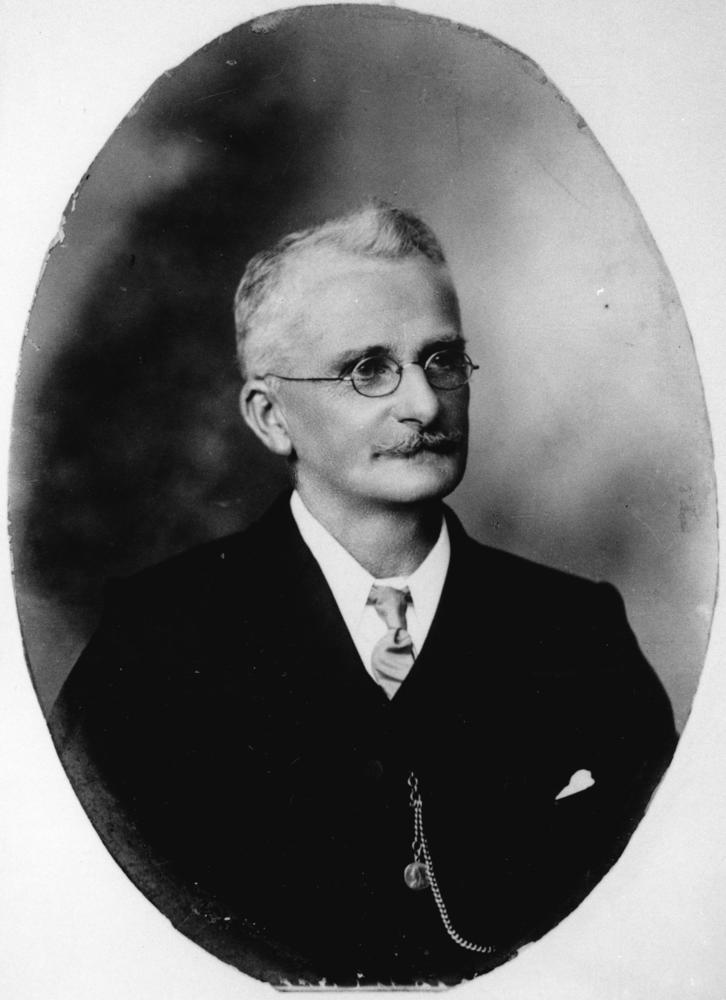
- Alfred John Raymond, 1915.

39th Mayor of Brisbane
- In office 1912–1912
- Preceded by: Harry Diddams
- Succeeded by: Harry Doggett

Personal details
- Born: Alfred John Raymond; 1 February 1856 Clifton, Bristol, England
- Died: 14 October 1935 (aged 79) Brisbane, Queensland, Australia
- Resting place: Toowong Cemetery
- Spouse(s): Elizabeth Paul (m.1878 d.1886), Jessie Catherine Shearer (m.1888 d.1933), May Evelyn Nott (née Wright) (m.1935 d.1969)
- Occupation: Carpenter, Timber merchant

Alfred John Raymond (1 February 1856 – 14 October 1935) was timber merchant and politician in Brisbane, Queensland, Australia. He was Mayor of Brisbane in 1912.

== Early life ==
Alfred was born in Clifton, Bristol, England to parents Henry George Raymond and Mary Ann (née Hewland), the fifth of eight children. The family lived at 16 Camden Terrace, Clifton.

Alfred like his father was a carpenter and builder by trade and was probably apprenticed to his father. Apart from this, we know little of his early life, other than that his family were staunch supporters of the Hope Chapel, a Congregational Church a few streets from their home. Alfred was a deeply devout man throughout his life and an active lay worker in the Congregational Church.

== Immigrating ==
In 1878, Alfred married Elizabeth (Bessie) Paul and they had two sons, Alfred (known as Fred, born 1879) and Leslie (born 1882). Elizabeth suffered from some illness, possibly tuberculosis, and it was advised that she move to a warmer climate for her health. So the family immigrated to Queensland on the "Duke of Buckingham", arrived at Cooktown on 27 January 1884 and then continued south to Brisbane.

In 1885–86, Alfred was a carpenter and living at Morrison's cottages, Stanley Street on the south side of Brisbane beside the river. In 2009, this is around the Kurilpa Point parkland beside the William Jolly Bridge.

However, it was not a happy time for the newly arrived Raymond family. Shortly after their arrival in Brisbane, their baby son Leslie died on 4 April 1884 and then exactly two years later (4 April 1886) Bessie died. Bessie and Leslie are buried together in Toowong Cemetery. Devastated by Bessie's death, Alfred is said to have returned to England with his surviving son Alfred (known as Fred), only to decide on returning that the climate was better in Brisbane and so he came back to Brisbane. However, there is no proof that these journeys took place, but equally there are no records of Alfred in Brisbane in years immediately after Bessie's death.

What is certain is that on 20 June 1888, Alfred remarries, to a Jessie Catherine Shearer, the Brisbane-born daughter of Thomas Shearer and Jessie (née Harrower), in the Wharf Street Congregational Church, Brisbane.

== Public life ==
In the 1890s, the Raymond family lived in "Avonmore", 22 Salstone Street, Kangaroo Point (Alfred's family home in Bristol was only a couple of blocks from the Avon River). It was while living at Salstone Street that Alfred became interested in politics and in 1894 he was elected as alderman for the ward of Kangaroo Point. Although South Brisbane was then a separate town to Brisbane, Kangaroo Point was curiously a ward of Brisbane and not of South Brisbane. The park at the end of Salstone Street is named Raymond Park in honour of Alfred John Raymond's contribution to Kangaroo Point. The house "Avonmore" burnt down on 4 November 2020 and the Brisbane City Council approved an application to demolish it in June 2021.

Alfred represented Kangaroo Point from 1894 to 1899 when he decided to resign from politics (reasons unknown). However, he was to return to local politics as alderman for Kangaroo Point again from 1902 to 1903, but was unexpected defeated in the elections of February 1904. He was again alderman from 1911 to 1924. He was mayor of Brisbane in 1912. He was extremely active in local politics and served on many committees:

- Works Committee: 1894–96, 1899, 1902, 1912, 1914, 1918–23
- Health Committee: 1895, 1899, 1911, 1915, 1918
- Parks Committee: 1896, 1899, 1902, 1911, 1914–15, 1921–23
- Ferries Committee: 1902
- Legislative Committee: 1897–98, 1911
- Finance Committee: 1898, 1911, 1913, 1915–16, 1919
- Building Act Committee: 1902
- City Organ and Theatres Committee: 1911
- Town Hall Special Committee: 1912–13, 1919–24
- City of Brisbane Incorporation Act Committee: 1912
- New Parks Special Committee: 1912–14
- Kennedy Wharf Special Committee: 1912
- City Engineer's Department Special Committee: 1912
- City Engineer's Office Staff Special Committee: 1912
- General Purposes Committee: 1913
- Wharfs Special Committee: 1913
- Ferries and Baths Committee: 1914–16
- Parks Special Committee: 1915
- Lighting Committee: 1918–23
- Markets Committee: 1919–21
- Vigilance Special Committee: 1919
- Entertainments Special Committee: 1920–21
- Works and Lighting Committee: 1923–24
- Parks and Gardens Committee: 1923–24

Raymond unsuccessfully contested the electoral district of Woolloongabba in the 1896 Queensland colonial election.

Alfred Raymond stood unsuccessfully for election as mayor of Brisbane City Council in 1924 on behalf of the United Party and the Queensland Women's Electoral League.

From 1902, Alfred Raymond was a Justice of the Peace.

Alfred Raymond was involved in promoting Bowkett Societies, where members pooled their funds to make loans to one another based on a lottery system.

== Timber merchant ==
In those times, being an alderman was not regarded as a full-time job and despite his many civic duties, Alfred was also kept very busy with his business as a timber merchant. The business operated from a number of locations over the years, including near the docks at South Brisbane (close to the Victoria Bridge, now the Flag Court at South Bank Parklands), Holman Street at Kangaroo Point (now Captain Burke Park), and later in Newstead near the Newstead Gasworks. In addition, Alfred also operated as a builder, buying land in new estates (now Brisbane's inner suburbs) and building houses upon them, then selling them to the expanding Brisbane population. In 1898, Alfred lost his right hand in an accident at his timber mill and photos taken of him later in life always position him carefully to hide that arm.

The timber mill at Newstead was virtually destroyed in a massive fire in August 1913. The fire was believed to have been started by children, but spread quickly through the timber yard. The fire brigade was summoned by the nearby tramway depot at about 5 am. When the firemen arrived, the flames were described as rising 100 feet into the air. Firemen were summoned from many stations: headquarters, Fortitude Valley, New Farm, Windsor, Milton, Hamilton and Ithaca. The firemen worked desperately to prevent the fire spreading to adjacent premises, finally quelling the fire around 6 pm. The damage was estimated at 30,000 pounds.

== Church life ==
In addition to his civic duties and his business, Alfred was also an active participant in the Congregational Church (in particular the Wharf Street congregation). He attended many Congregational Church conferences (meetings where policy and other issues were discussed) and was for some time the President of the Congregational Union in Queensland. In June 1920, he and his wife Jessie attended the Congregational Council held in Boston, USA.

Alfred was a very religious man, who took his family to church twice every Sunday. He was a strict father and a strong believer in doing what he thought was right. He did not drink, but did keep a bottle of sherry at home for guests who did not share his views. He thought it was a man's responsibility to look after his extended family; apparently he supported some of his wife Jessie's family. He thought all men were equal regardless of race or colour; he said that there was no man of any colour for whom he would not stop to say Good Morning. He was a good singer.

== Home and family life ==
Around 1900, Alfred decided to move to a newer, larger home "Clifton" at 178 River Terrace (corner of Walmsley Street) at Kangaroo Point, opposite the Kangaroo Point Cliffs. The house was named after Alfred's suburb back in Bristol. The move was prompted partly because he was now prospering in his business and partly because his marriage to Jessie had by then produced six children (Henry 1889, Ruby 1891, Archie 1893, Evelyn 1895, Elsie 1897, Harold 1899) in addition to his son Fred from his first marriage. Although Ruby and Elsie both died young, by 1900, there were five children to be accommodated and, as it would turn out, there would be three more children born at the new home (Ethel 1901, Jessie 1904, Wilfred 1906).

"Clifton" was a large wooden Queensland-style home. Being a timber merchant and builder, Alfred was able to have a large home. It was said to have a hall big enough for a game of children's cricket, could accommodate two live-in servants in addition to the family, and many years later the house was sold and converted into ten flats. Late in the 20th century, the house was relocated to Pullenvale (and converted back to a family home) so that the now-valuable River Terrace site could be redeveloped (but in 2009 it remains a vacant block.)

Alfred and Jessie experienced many of the sadnesses of parents of this era, losing their youngest child Wilfred to infantile paralysis (polio) and their son Archie to a sniper's bullet in World War I. Their daughter Ethel was keen to work outside the home as a "business girl" (clerical work); however, Alfred did not approve of this plan and Ethel remained at home where (perhaps as a compromise) she acted as secretary and chauffeur to her father (who had by then lost his right hand).

== Later in life ==
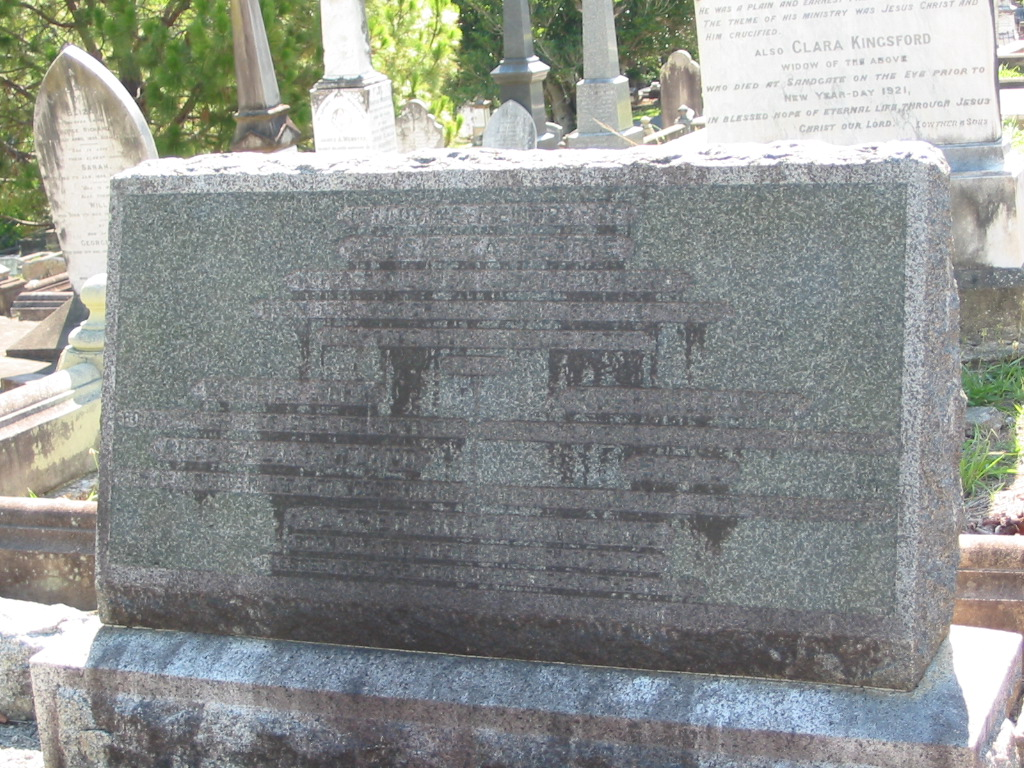
Alfred's headstone in Toowong Cemetery (now unreadable)

As an alderman for many years, Alfred had been involved in the planning for Brisbane's "new" city hall to replace the Brisbane Town Hall then in Queen Street. Alfred's name appears on the foundation stone laid in 1920 among the list of aldermen.

In the 1920s (perhaps after he retired from politics), Alfred and Jessie and some of their children went to England to visit Alfred's family. The journey also included a visit to son Archie's war grave in the Flat Iron Copse Cemetery, Mametz near Albert, France.

Although he had retired from politics by then, Alfred and Jessie were included in the guests at the opening of the Brisbane City Hall by the Duke and Duchess of York in 1930, one of Brisbane's biggest gala occasions.

Jessie died in 1933 following many years of heart trouble. In January 1935, Alfred (then 78 years old) scandalised his family by marrying his third wife, May Evelyn Nott (née Wright). May was in her late fifties and was the widow of Frederick Lancelot Nott, a Queensland parliamentarian. However, many believed that, after Jessie's death, Alfred had become very lonely living on his own in his large house at River Terrace, as his children had by then all married and established their own homes. The marriage was short-lived however, as Alfred died that same year on 14 October 1935. He was buried in Toowong Cemetery with his second wife Jessie and their three young children: Ruby, Elsie and Wilfred.

His third wife May survived Alfred by many years, dying in 1969. Her ashes were placed in the grave of her first husband Frederick Lancelot Nott at South Brisbane Cemetery.

== See also ==
- List of mayors and lord mayors of Brisbane
