= Alfred Hubbard (mayor) =

English-born Australian politician

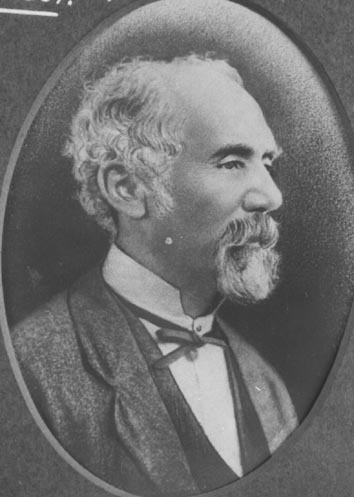

13th Mayor of Brisbane
- In office 1877–1878
- Preceded by: Richard Kingsford
- Succeeded by: John Heal

Personal details
- Born: Alfred Hubbard; 1812 England
- Died: 2 February 1887 (aged 74 or 75) Southport, Queensland, Australia
- Resting place: Southport Cemetery
- Spouse: Elizabeth
- Occupation: Shopkeeper

Alfred Hubbard (c. 1812 – 1887) was an alderman and mayor of Brisbane Municipal Council.

== Personal life ==
Alfred Hubbard was born in England about 1812–1813, the son of Nathaniel and Rebecca Hubbard.

Alfred arrived in Brisbane in about 1860.

In 1875, Alfred Hubbard was living as a freeholder in Wharf Street, Brisbane.

Alfred Hubbard died aged 74 years on 2 Feb 1887 at his residence "The Poplars" at Labrador, Southport, Queensland following an illness of 2 years; he was survived by his widow Elizabeth.

== Business life ==
In 1871 Alfred Hubbard was a shopkeeper in Queen Street.

In 1876 at the Brisbane Exhibition, Alfred Hubbard won second prize with his Little Wanzer in the sewing machine competition.

== Public life ==
In 1874 Alfred Hubbard was a member of the Brisbane Hospital Committee.

Alfred Hubbard served as an alderman of North Ward on the Brisbane Municipal Council from 1875 to 1879 and was elected mayor of Brisbane in 1877 – 1878.

He served on the following committees:

- Finance Committee 1875
- Legislative Committee 1875 – 1878
- Improvement Committee 1877, 1878

In 1876 Alfred Hubbard was sworn in as a magistrate in Brisbane.

In April 1879, Alfred Hubbard resigned as an alderman and from the Local Health Committee.
