= Richard Ash Kingsford =

Australian politician

Richard Kingsford
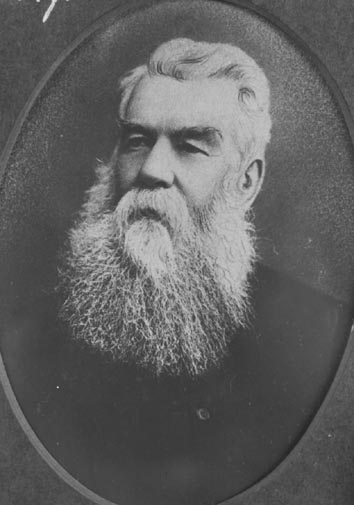

12th Mayor of Brisbane
- In office 1876–1876
- Preceded by: James Swan
- Succeeded by: Alfred Hubbard

Member of the Queensland Legislative Assembly for South Brisbane
- In office 26 May 1875 – 21 August 1883
- Preceded by: Thomas Blacket Stephens
- Succeeded by: Henry Jordan

Personal details
- Born: Richard Ash Kingsford; 2 October 1821 Canterbury, Kent, England
- Died: 2 January 1902 (aged 80) Brisbane, Queensland, Australia
- Resting place: Cairns Pioneer Cemetery
- Spouse(s): Sarah Southerden (m.1852 d.1890), Emma Jane Dexter (m.1892)
- Relations: Sir Charles Kingsford Smith (grandson)
- Occupation: Draper, Fruit grower, Poultry farmer

Richard Ash Kingsford (1821–1902) was an alderman and mayor of Brisbane Municipal Council, a Member of the Legislative Assembly of Queensland, Australia, and a mayor of Cairns, Queensland. He is the grandfather of the aviator Sir Charles Kingsford Smith

== Early life and education ==
Richard Ash Kingsford was born on 2 October 1821 in Canterbury, Kent, England, the son of John Kingsford and Mary Anne Walker.

In 1852, after marrying Sarah Southerden, his first wife, in the fourth quarter of 1851, Kingsford and his wife emigrated to Sydney and, ultimately, relocated to Brisbane in 1854.

== Career ==
=== Business life ===
Kingsford was a partner in a drapery business in Queen Street, Brisbane with his brother John in the 1860s. Later (around 1878), he had a poultry farm at the Springs, Tingalpa, east of Brisbane.

Daughter Catherine and her husband William Charles Smith, a bank manager, had moved to Cairns. In about 1883, Richard and Sarah Kingsford followed them there and established a fruit farm near Kuranda. In 1890, he bought the Hambledon sugar plantation from Thomas Swallow (father-in-law of Kingsford's daughter Caroline) and then leased it back to his sons Swallow Bros. Kingsford sold the plantation in 1897 to the Colonial Sugar Refining Company.

=== Public life ===
Kingsford was an alderman of the Brisbane Municipal Council from 1875 to 1876, serving as mayor in 1876. He served on the following council committees:

- Finance Committee 1875
- Improvement Committee 1876

Following the retirement of Thomas Blacket Stephens due to illness, in May 1875 Kingsford was elected by a large majority against the attorney-general, Ratcliffe Pring, for the South Brisbane seat in the Queensland Legislative Assembly, which he held until he lost it in the 1883 election.

Following his move to Cairns, he was elected chairman of the Cairns Divisional Board in 1884. On 28 May 1885, Cairns was declared a municipality and Kingsford was unanimously elected mayor by the aldermen at the council's first meeting on 22 July. He was mayor of Cairns 1885–86 and in 1889.

In 1888 Kingsford stood for election in the Cairns seat of the Queensland Legislative Assembly, but was defeated by Frederick Thomas Wimble, founder and editor of the Cairns Post.

== Personal life ==
Kingsford married Sarah Southerden in the December quarter of 1851 at Bridge, Kent, England. The Kingsfords emigrated to Sydney in 1852 and went on to Brisbane in 1854. Their marriage produced four children;

- Catherine Mary (b. 1857 in Brisbane)
- Emily Jane (b. 1859 in Brisbane)
- Caroline Elizabeth (b. 1861 in Brisbane)
- Richard Arthur (b. 1863 in Ashford, Kent)

Kingsford was a Baptist and a lay preacher and one of the founders of the Wharf Street Baptist Church, now the Baptist City Tabernacle.

Following the birth of Caroline in 1861, the family returned to England, where daughter Emily Jane died in 1862, and son Richard Arthur was born in 1863 (both in Ashford, Kent). They remained in England for a period and Richard, Sarah and the 3 surviving children were recorded in the 1871 census as living at Edenbridge, Kent. Richard's occupation was given as Australian Merchant. The family returned to Brisbane in October 1871.

On 17 April 1878, while living at The Springs, Tingalpa, his eldest daughter Catherine married William Charles Smith. Because of the confusions caused by having such a common name as Smith, the couple adopted the surname Kingsford-Smith (or Kingsford Smith) and were the parents of noted Australian aviator Sir Charles Kingsford Smith.

On 8 April 1885, daughter Caroline married William Swallow, son of Thomas Swallow in Port Melbourne, Victoria.

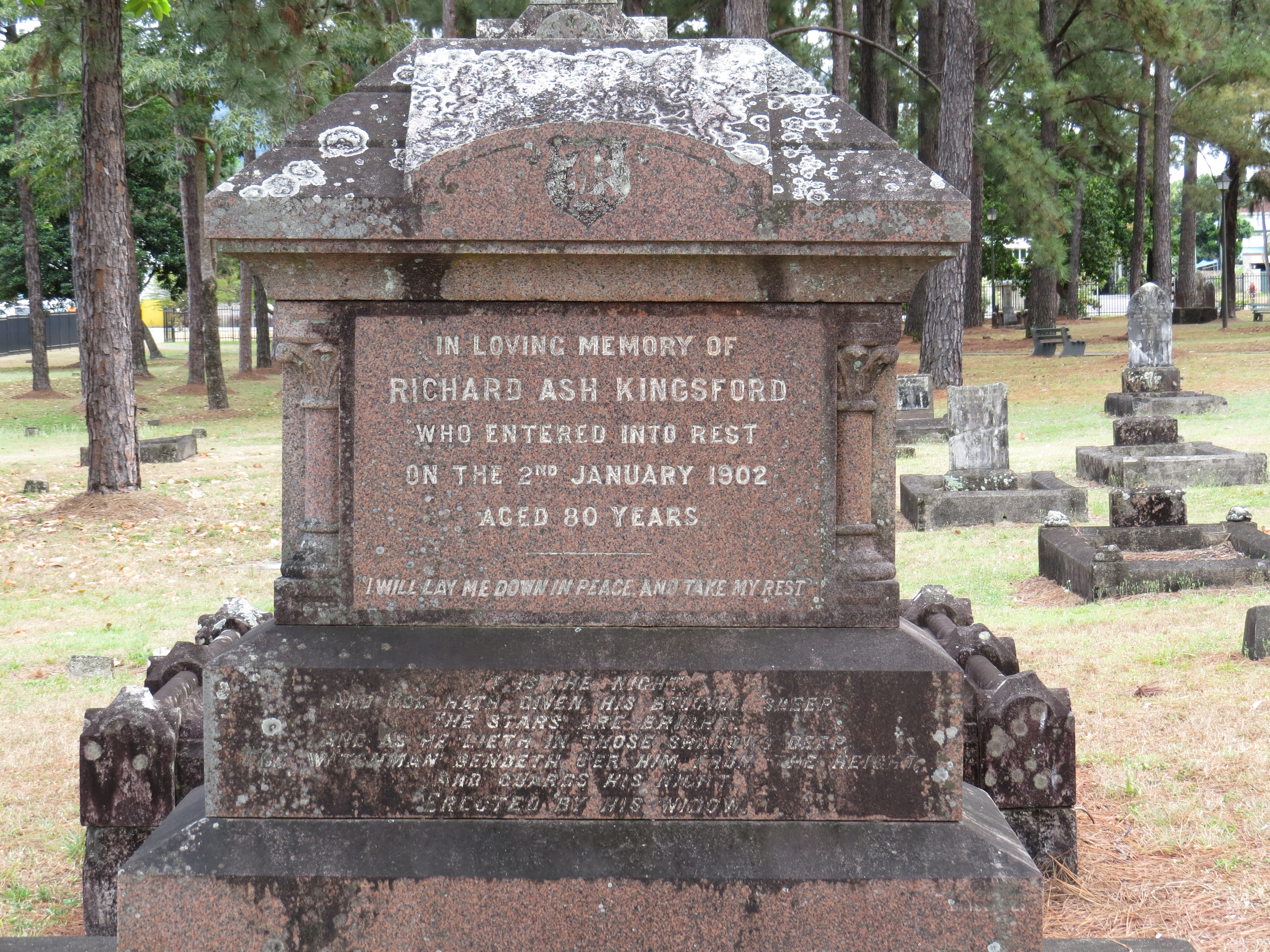
Headstone for Richard Ash Kingsford in McLeod Street pioneer cemetery, Cairns

Richard and Sarah moved to Cairns around 1883, where son-in-law William Smith was working as a bank manager. Some time after Kingsford's failure in the 1888 election in Cairns, the couple moved to Tasmania. Sarah died at Fairview House, Launceston, Tasmania on 13 September 1890.

On 31 August 1892, Kingsford remarried; his second wife being Emma Jane Dexter in Launceston, Tasmania. The couple had a daughter, Dorothy (b. 20 June 1893 in Tasmania).

Kingsford returned to Cairns in 1895 where he built a magnificent cedar and hardwood home called "Fairview" on the prominent Munros Hill in Mooroobool. It had 28 bedrooms and was completed in 1896. Kingsford spent his retirement in the home, until his death on 2 January 1902 at "Invicta", the residence of the Kingsford Smiths (his daughter and son-in-law) in Cairns, North Queensland, Australia at age 80. He was buried in the Cairns Pioneer Cemetery in McLeod Street.

Kingsford's widow Emma died on 8 September 1943 in Buenos Aires.

== Legacy ==
Kingsford Street in Mooroobool, Cairns is named after him, as is the main restaurant Kingsford's in the Cairns International Hotel.

His home Fairview in Cairns became the Z Experimental Station during World War II. The building was subsequently destroyed in a fire and in 1996 a 72-apartment complex with six three-storey buildings was constructed on the site.

== See also ==
- List of mayors and lord mayors of Brisbane

Civic offices
Preceded by James Swan	Mayor of Brisbane; 1876	Succeeded by Alfred Hubbard
Parliament of Queensland
Preceded by Thomas Blacket Stephens	Member for South Brisbane; 1875-1883	Succeeded by Henry Jordan
