= James Francis Maxwell =

Australian politician

James Maxwell
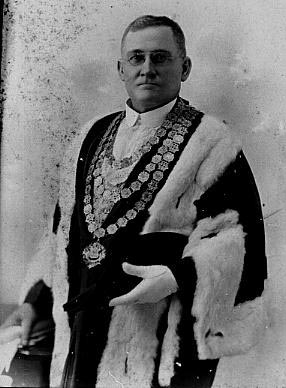
- James Maxwell in his mayoral robes, 1920.

43rd Mayor of Brisbane
- In office 1920–1921
- Preceded by: Charles Packenham Buchanan
- Succeeded by: Harry Diddams

Member of the Queensland Legislative Assembly for Toowong
- In office 9 October 1920 – 2 April 1938
- Preceded by: Edward Macartney
- Succeeded by: Harry Massey

Personal details
- Born: James Francis Maxwell; 1862 County Armagh, Ireland
- Died: 16 April 1941 (aged 78-79) Brisbane, Queensland, Australia
- Resting place: Toowong Cemetery
- Party: Queensland United Party
- Other party: Country and Progressive National Party, National
- Spouse: Alice Annie Letitia Davies (m.1890 d.1953)
- Occupation: Painter and decorator

James Francis Maxwell was a politician in Queensland, Australia. He was the mayor of the City of Brisbane and a member of the Queensland Legislative Assembly for Toowong.

== Early life ==
James Francis Maxwell was born in 1862 in County Armagh, Ireland, the son of Samuel Maxwell and his wife Matilda (née Stoops). On 23 July 1890 he married Alice Annie Letitia Davies at St Peter's Church at West End, Brisbane, the daughter of John Davies, the engineer and manager at the South Brisbane Gas Company who designed the (now heritage-listed) West End Gasworks.

== Politics ==
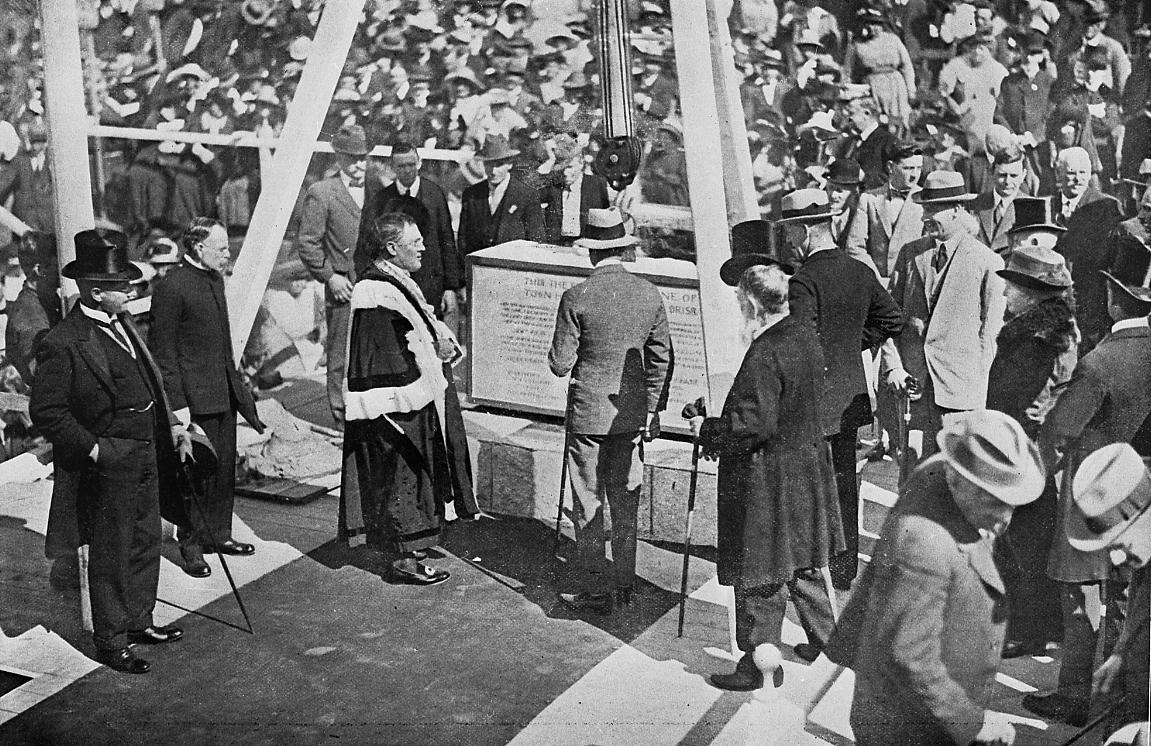
His Royal Highness the Prince of Wales and Lord Mayor James Francis Maxwell at the laying of the foundation stone, Brisbane City Hall 1920.

Maxwell was a member of the Toombul Shire Council and its chairman in 1904 and 1905.

Maxwell was the mayor of the City of Brisbane from 1920 to 1921.

Maxwell was elected to Queensland Legislative Assembly on 9 October 1920, for Toowong as a member of the National Party. He was re-elected on 15 May 1923 as a member for the Queensland United Party and then re-elected on 8 May 1926 as a member of Country and Progressive National Party. He did not contest the election of 2 April 1938.

Civic offices
Preceded by Charles Packenham Buchanan	Mayor of Brisbane; 1920–1921	Succeeded by Harry Diddams
Parliament of Queensland
Preceded by Edward Macartney	Member for Toowong; 1920–1938	Succeeded by Harry Massey
