= John Sinclair (mayor) =

Australian politician

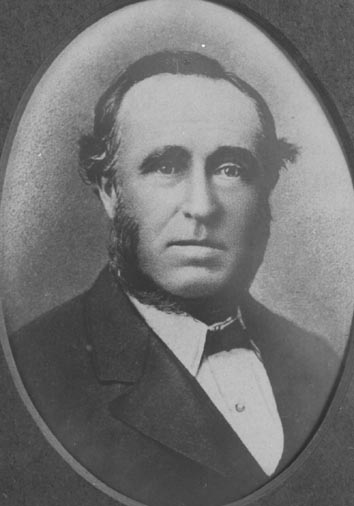

15th Mayor of Brisbane
- In office 1880–1881
- Preceded by: John Heal
- Succeeded by: Robert Porter

Personal details
- Born: John Sinclair; 8 December 1827 Govan, Lanarkshire, Scotland
- Died: 5 May 1906 (aged 78) Kangaroo Point, Queensland, Australia
- Resting place: Toowong Cemetery
- Spouse(s): Jane Kelman (m.1857 d.1872), Constance Isabel Georgina Geoghegan (m.1888 d.1893)
- Occupation: Engineer

John Sinclair (1827–1906) was an alderman and mayor of the Town of Brisbane in Queensland, Australia.

== Personal life ==
John Sinclair was born at Govan, Lanarkshire, Scotland on 8 December 1827, the son of John Sinclair and Jane Smith.

John Sinclair married Jane Kelman in Brisbane on 11 August 1857. They had several children (most of whom died in infancy):

- Jessie Jane Sinclair, born about 1859, married to George Robert Townsend on 23 February 1881
- John Sinclair, born in Brisbane on 10 May 1860, died 9 January 1863
- Christine Swan Sinclair, born in Brisbane on 2 April 1862, died in Brisbane on 7 January 1863
- Margaret Callander Sinclair, born in Brisbane on 18 December 1863
- James Swan Sinclair, born in Brisbane on 12 August 1865
- Jane Kelman Sinclair, born in Brisbane on 17 January 1867, died in Brisbane on 4 April 1867
- Matilda Maria Sinclair, born in Brisbane on 21 February 1869, died in Brisbane on 4 May 1869

His wife Jane died in Brisbane on 11 February 1872.

Tragically, two of the children who survived infancy died as young adults. His daughter Margaret died in Brisbane on 10 August 1886 aged 22 years from a cold that escalated into diphtheria. His son James died six months later; he drowned while droving cattle across Kyabra Creek at Euroongoola Station in Western Queensland on 27 February 1887 aged 21 years.

On 14 January 1888 in Brisbane, John Sinclair married again to Constance Isabel Georgina Geoghegan, the daughter of Thomas Geoghegan and Margaret Maria Hebden. They had two children:

- Arthur John Sinclair, born in Brisbane on 29 October 1888, married Rosa Gertrude Chuter on 16 November 1911
- Hazel Jean Sinclair, born in Brisbane on 13 April 1892, married John Lionel Barry on 3 June 1913

His second wife Constance died at their home, Delholm, Kangaroo Point on 21 May 1893.

Having lost both wives, John Sinclair spend his later years in poor health, living at his home, Delholm, at 393 Main Street, Kangaroo Point, attended by a housekeeper, a groom and a male nurse.

John Sinclair died at Kangaroo Point, Brisbane on 5 May 1906 aged 78 years and was buried in Toowong Cemetery, together with his second wife Constance and his two of his adult children Margaret and James.

== Business life ==
In 1854 John Sinclair came to Brisbane as engineer on the steamer Boomerang, which brought to Brisbane the news of the fall of Sevastopol and of the Eureka Stockade. Later he settled in Brisbane and worked as an engineer. In 1868 he was appointed as manager of Queensland Iron Works, owned by Robert R. Smellie. He was such a success as a manager in expanding the business that he became a partner in 1872 The iron shipbuilding branch of the business was responsible for building the Louisa, a cargo steamer that was used for trade along the Brisbane River between Ipswich and Moreton Bay.

== Public life ==
John Sinclair was an alderman of the Brisbane Municipal Council for the ward of Kangaroo Point from 1871 until 1874 when he retired. In 1876 he was elected again as alderman. He was mayor of the Brisbane Municipal Council in 1880 and 1881 and then retired again in 1882. However, he was elected again as alderman in 1886 and 1887, after which he finally retired from the council.

He served on the following committees:

- Finance Committee 1871, 1872, 1874, 1878, 1887
- Legislative Committee 1872–1874, 1876, 1877, 1879–1881, 1886, 1887
- Improvement Committee 1877, 1879–1881
- Brisbane Board of Waterworks 1879–1901
- Wharfage Committee 1881
- Town Hall Committee 1886
- Works Committee 1886

In Sept 1881, during his time as mayor, Brisbane received a royal visit from Prince Edward (later Duke of Clarence and Avondale and Earl of Athlone) and his brother Prince George (later George V of the United Kingdom). Assisted by his daughters Jessie and Margaret, John Sinclair entertained the royal party at a ball in the old Exhibition Building, a function of great brilliance.

== See also ==
- List of mayors and lord mayors of Brisbane
- Photo of John Sinclair, 1880
