= Brisbane Town Hall =

Brisbane Town Hall may refer to:

- Brisbane City Hall, the current building in Brisbane, Queensland, Australia
- First Brisbane Town Hall, the first town hall in Brisbane, Queensland, Australia (no longer extant)
