= James Swan (mayor of Brisbane) =

Australian politician

The Hon James Swan
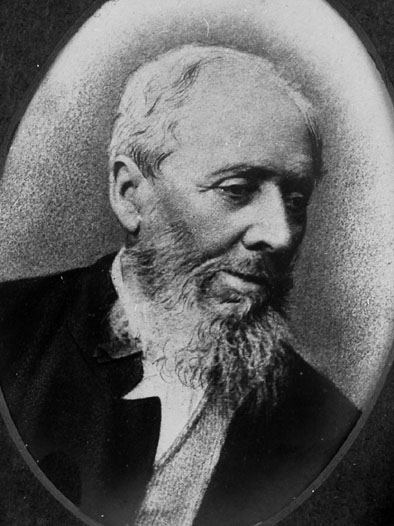

11th Mayor of Brisbane
- In office 1873–1875
- Preceded by: Edward Baines
- Succeeded by: Richard Kingsford

Member of the Queensland Legislative Council
- In office 18 April 1878 – 26 May 1891

Personal details
- Born: James Swan; 1811 Glasgow, Scotland
- Died: 1891 (aged 79–80) Red Sea off Port Said, Egypt
- Resting place: Burial at sea
- Spouse(s): Christina Mackay (m.1831 d.1888), Christina Meikle (m.1889 d.1929)
- Occupation: Printer, Newspaper proprietor

James Swan (1811–1891) was an alderman and mayor of the Brisbane Municipal Council and a Member of the Queensland Legislative Council.

== Personal life ==
James Swan was born in 1811 in Glasgow, Scotland, the son of Daniel Swan and Jennet McLaren. His father Daniel Swan was a private in the Highland Light Infantry who was killed in the Peninsular War. Jennet McLaren was a deaf mute, who was murdered in front of her son James in August 1823. James Swan was a devout Baptist.

In 1831, James married Christina Mackay, daughter of John and Christina Mackay. In 1837, James emigrated from Glasgow to Sydney with the Rev Dr John Dunmore Lang. In 1846, James Swan moved to Brisbane. James's wife Christina died aged 76 years at their home "Burnside" at Swan Hill (now Windsor), Brisbane on 27 January 1888 after a lingering illness and was buried in Toowong Cemetery.

James married again on 10 January 1889 to Christina Meikle, daughter of the late Thomas Meikle and Christina McCallum. James Swan died on 26 May 1891 on board the ship Jelunga while in the Mediterranean Sea bound for England. He was travelling with his wife for a 12-month visit. Aged 80 and in poor health when he commenced the trip, many doubted they would see him return, although his health had improved during the voyage. He was buried at sea off Port Said, Egypt but he was memorialised on his first wife's grave in Toowong Cemetery. James's second wife Christina died on 3 March 1929 aged 71 years. She was buried in Toowong Cemetery with her mother Christina Meikle (née McCallum).

== Business life ==
James Swan was apprenticed to the printing trade in Glasgow. On arrival in Sydney in 1837, he worked on Rev Dr John Dunmore Lang's newspaper, The Colonialist until it ceased publication in 1841. James then joined the staff of the Sydney Herald, but later left it to take up farming, where he did not do well.

In 1846, the Moreton Bay Courier was founded in Brisbane by Arthur Sidney Lyon, who persuaded James Swan to come to Brisbane and work on the newspaper. Lyon had money problems and about 18 months later, James Swan took over the newspaper. Lyon commenced a rival newspaper Free Press but James Swan competed vigorously and the Free Press had only a short life. In 1859, James sold the Moreton Bay Courier to Thomas Blacket Stephens who renamed it the Brisbane Courier.

James Swan was opposed to the use of convict labour in Queensland and to the grabbing of land by squatters. He also campaigned vigorously for the separation of Queensland to become a separate colony from New South Wales. James Swan owned much real estate in and around Brisbane including two hotels. After providing for his second wife, his will directed that his substantial estate was to be distributed to various charities with the bulk of it going to the Baptist Church.

== Politics ==
James Swan was an alderman of the Brisbane Municipal Council from 1872 to 1875 and was mayor from 1873 to 1875.

He served on the following committees:

- Legislative Committee 1873
- Improvement Committee 1873–1875
- Cab Inspection Committee 1875

He was a force behind the decision to build the Victoria Bridge, the first bridge over the Brisbane River.

James Swan was appointed to the Legislative Council of Queensland on 18 April 1878. Being a lifetime appointment, he served until his death on 26 May 1891.

== See also ==
- List of mayors and lord mayors of Brisbane

Civic offices
Preceded by Edward Baines	Mayor of Brisbane; 1873–1875	Succeeded by Richard Kingsford
