= William Andrew Seal =

Australian house painter and politician

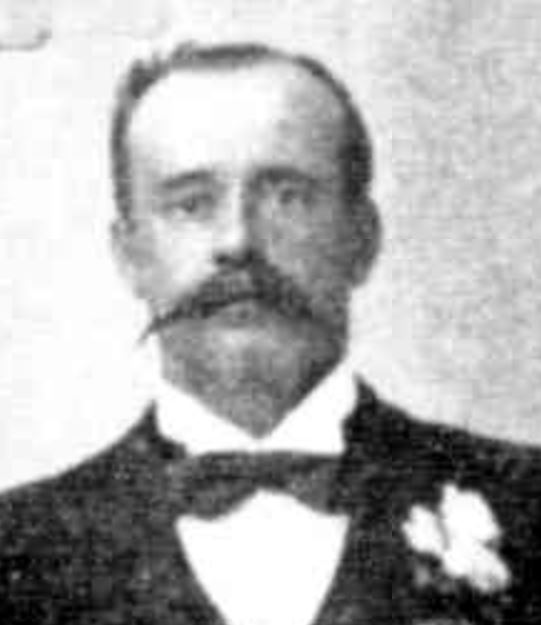
William Andrew Seal Former Lord Mayor of Brisbane

William Andrew Seal was a house painter and politician in Brisbane, Queensland, Australia. He was Mayor of Brisbane in 1899. He was born in Sydney in 1857 and died in Brisbane on 4 Sept 1904.

Born in Sydney in 1857 he also received his early education there. In 1863 his parents settled in Brisbane and when 14 years of age, Mr Seal entered the employ of Mr Harle of Edward Street under whose instruction he mastered all the requirements of the business of painter and decorator. At the age of 21 he commenced business on his own account in the district in which he lived, Fortitude Valley and his premises in Brunswick Street were for many years well known by the public. With undeviating perseverance he built a business that was closely associated with the development of Fortitude Valley.
