= Amelia Hetherington =

Australian philanthropist (1862-1939)

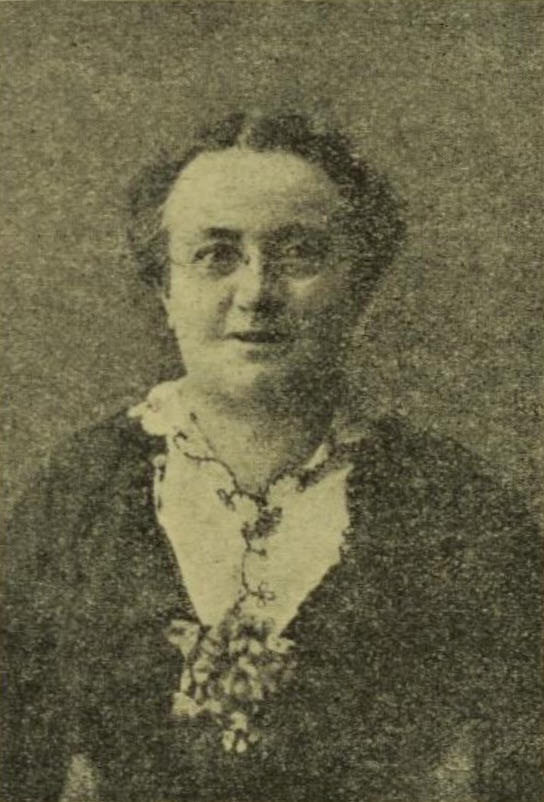
- Hetherington in 1916
- Born: Amelia Phillips; 8 October 1862; Dalby, Queensland
- Died: 25 September 1939 (aged 76); Kangaroo Point, Queensland
- Known for: philanthropic work during World War I
- Awards: Médaille d'Argent de la Réconnaissance Française

Amelia Hetherington (born Amelia Phillips, 8 October 1862 – 25 September 1939) was a philanthropist in Brisbane, Queensland, Australia. The French Government awarded her a Médaille d'Argent de la Réconnaissance Française or silver Medal of French Gratitude for her philanthropic work supporting the war efforts in France during World War I.

Hetherington was born in the Dalby district to Susan Wilkinson and George Phillip Phillips. She grew up in Dalby, until she moved with her family to North Ipswich where she attended school. She married John William Hetherington in Ipswich. They had a daughter and three sons. John became the Mayor of Brisbane in 1910, 1916 and 1917.

During World War I, Hetherington was president of the Kangaroo Branch of the Red Cross. In 1918 she was awarded the Médaille d'Argent de la Réconnaissance Française, or the silver Medal of French Gratitude for this work.

She died at her home in Kangaroo Point in 1939.
