= Charles Pakenham Buchanan =

Australian mayor and alderman; served two terms

Charles Buchanan
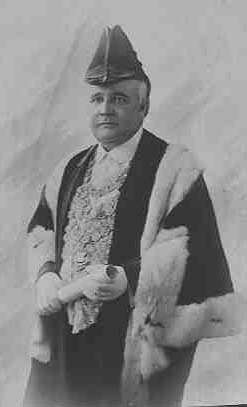
- Charles Pakenham Buchanan in his mayoral robes – 1919.

35th Mayor of Brisbane
- In office 1908–1908
- Preceded by: William Thompson
- Succeeded by: Thomas Wilson
- In office 1919–1919
- Preceded by: John McMaster
- Succeeded by: James Maxwell

Personal details
- Born: Charles Pakenham Buchanan; 9 November 1874 Brisbane, Queensland, Australia
- Died: 22 September 1924 (aged 49) Brisbane, Queensland, Australia
- Resting place: Toowong Cemetery
- Spouse: Elsie Waverley Newman (m.1899 d.1941)
- Occupation: Politician

Alderman Charles Pakenham Buchanan (9 November 1874 – 22 September 1924) was Mayor of Brisbane, Queensland, Australia from 1909 for two terms.

== Biography ==
Charles Pakenham Buchanan was born in Brisbane, Queensland, Australia on 9 November 1874 to John Alfred Buchanan (born Enniskillen, Fermanagh, Ireland 1843 – Brisbane 1886) and Jessie Jane Fraser (born Brisbane 14 December 1849 – Brisbane 1944).

He was educated at St. Joseph's College, Gregory Terrace in Brisbane. He attended the University of Sydney where he graduated with a B.A. in 1900.

He married Elsie Waverley Newman, daughter of the well known photographer John Hubert Newman in Sydney, New South Wales, Australia in 1899.

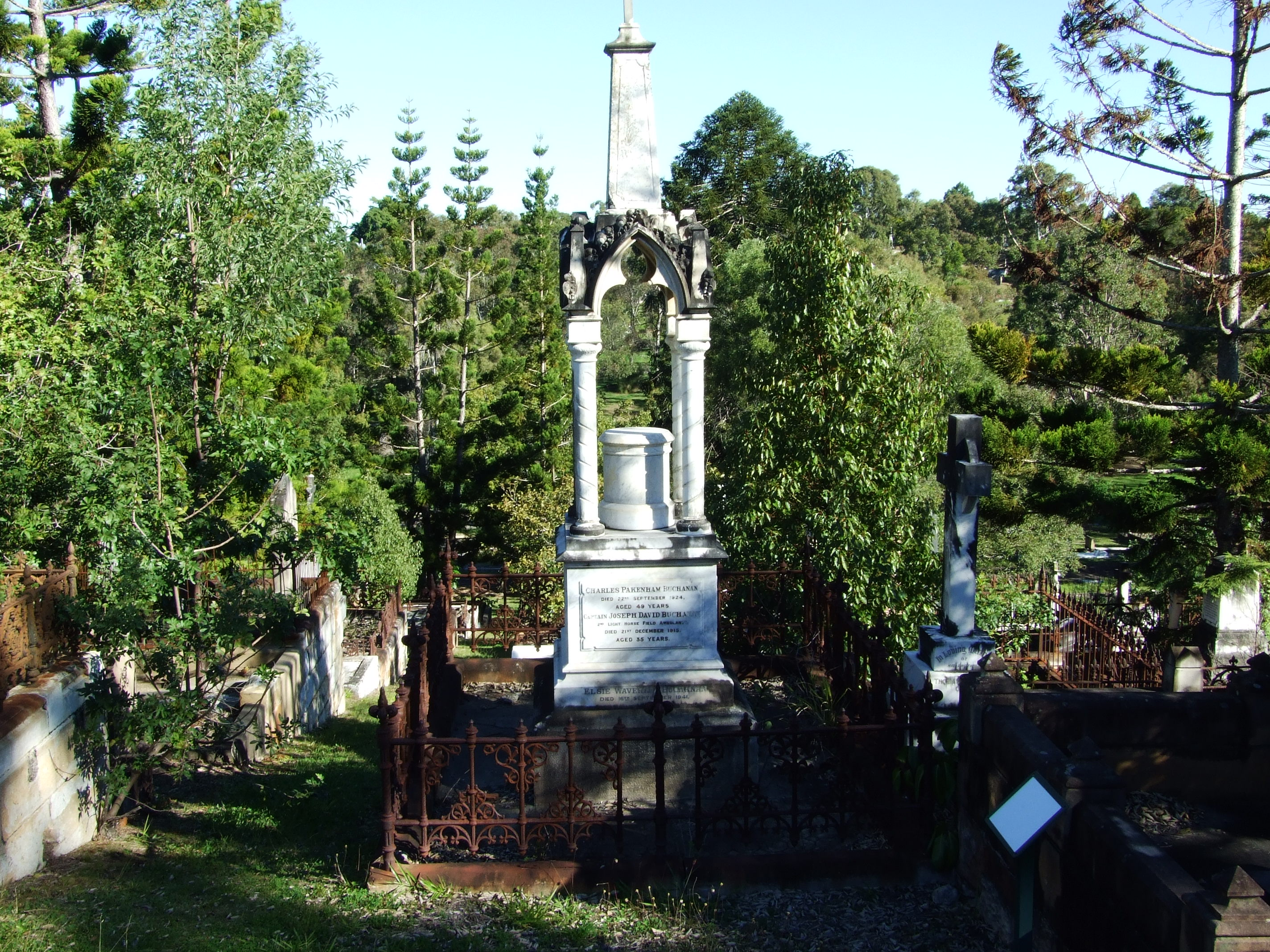
Monument at the burial site of Charles Pakenham Buchanan at Brisbane's Toowong Cemetery.

He had four sons (John Pakenham Buchanan, Reginald Patrick Pakenham Buchanan, Joseph MacKenzie Pakenham Buchanan and Hilary Packenham Buchanan) and 2 daughters (Marie Packenham Buchanan and Jean Jessie Pakenham Buchanan).

He was an alderman on the Brisbane City Council from 1904 – 1921. He was Mayor of Brisbane during two terms, from 1908 and from 1918 to 1919.

Charles Pakenham Buchanan died in Brisbane on 22 September 1924. He is buried in the Toowong Cemetery.

== Photographs ==
Alderman in 1908 Alderman in 1915 Charles in Academic dress

== Sources ==
- Buchanan, Charles Pakenham – Brisbane City Council Grave Location Search
