= Francis Murray (mayor) =

Australian politician

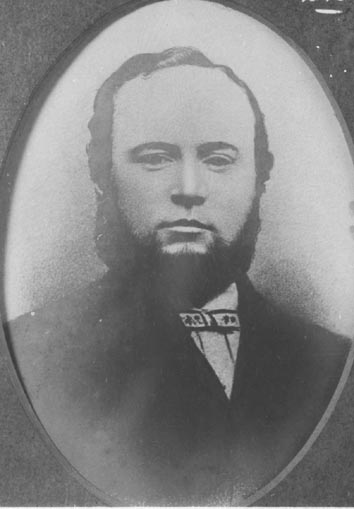

9th Mayor of Brisbane
- In office 1871–1871
- Preceded by: William Pettigrew
- Succeeded by: Edward Baines

Personal details
- Born: Francis Murray; 30 April 1838 Sydney, New South Wales, Australia
- Died: 15 August 1872 (aged 34) Maryborough, Queensland, Australia
- Resting place: Paddington Cemetery
- Spouse: Eliza Graham (m.1863)
- Occupation: Upholsterer, Undertaker, Money lender,

Francis Murray (1838–1872) was an alderman and mayor of the Brisbane Municipal Council.

== Personal life ==
Francis Murray was born in Sydney, 30 April 1838, son of Cornelius Murray and Mary Ann Freeman.

Francis married Eliza Graham on 11 June 1863 in Brisbane. They had the following children:

- Eliza Abigail (born Brisbane 2 Dec 1864, died Brisbane 18 June 1912)
- Alexander George (born Brisbane 2 Jan 1867, died Clifton 20 Nov 1933)
- Clara (born Brisbane 8 August 1868, died Brisbane 21 August 1959)
- Isabella Jane (born Brisbane 2 April 1870, died Brisbane 23 June 1870)
- Anna Maria (born Brisbane 6 June 1872 died Brisbane 23 October 1873)

Francis Murray died on 15 August 1872 at Maryborough, Queensland aged 34 years. His coffin was brought to Brisbane on the steamship "Lady Bowen" for the funeral at St Stephens Roman Catholic Cathedral and burial on 18 August 1872 at the Paddington Cemetery. He was survived by his widow and four children.

== Business life ==
Francis Murray was a cabinetmaker, upholsterer, undertaker, and money lender, owned shares in mining companies, and had a store in Queen Street.

== Public life ==
Francis Murray was an alderman from 1867 to 1872. He was mayor in 1871. His public service ended with his death.

He served on the following committees:

- Legislative Committee 1871.
- Finance Committee 1872.
- Improvement Committee 1871, 1872.

== See also ==
- List of mayors and lord mayors of Brisbane
