= Harry Doggett =

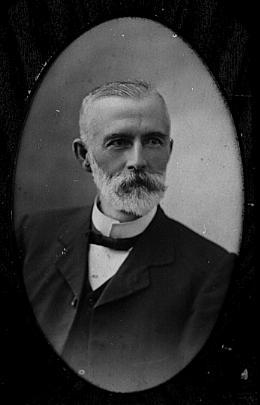
- Harry Doggett, 1917.

40th Mayor of Brisbane
- In office 1913–1913
- Preceded by: Alfred Raymond
- Succeeded by: Charles Jenkinson

Personal details
- Born: Henry Doggett; 11 January 1853 Bushey Heath, Hertfordshire, England
- Died: 16 June 1927 (aged 74) Brisbane, Queensland, Australia
- Resting place: Toowong Cemetery
- Spouse: Catherine Wood (m.1878 d.1921)
- Occupation: General contractor

Henry (Harry) Doggett (1853–1927) was a builder and mayor of the City of Brisbane in Queensland, Australia.

== Public life ==
Harry Doggett was an alderman of the Brisbane City Council in 1901 to 1904 representing the Valley ward and again from 1908 to 1924. He was mayor in 1913.

He served on the following council committees:

- Finance Committee 1901, 1903, 1908, 1909, 1911, 1912, 1914, 1916, 1918, 1920–1921
- Legislative Committee 1901
- Building Act Committee 1901, 1902
- Works Committee 1902–1904, 1908, 1910, 1913, 1915, 1917, 1919, 1921–1923
- Health Committee 1908–1912, 1914–1918, 1921–1924
- General Purposes Committee 1908, 1911, 1922–1923.
- Parks Committee 1902, 1903, 1910, 1911, 1916, 1919–1921
- Buildings & Alignment of Roads Committee 1909–1912, 1914, 1917–1924
- Town Hall Special Committee 1910–1917, 1919–1924
- City of Brisbane Incorporation Act Committee 1912–1915
- New Parks Special Committee 1912, 1913
- Markets Committee 1912, 1915–1923
- City Engineer's Office Staff Special Committee 1912
- Wharves Special Committee 1913
- Lighting Committee 1914, 1915, 1921–1923
- Ferries & Baths Committee 1902, 1917
- Entertainments Special Committee 1920–1921

== Personal life ==
Harry Doggett was born on 11 January 1853 at Bushey Heath, Hertfordshire, England, the son of John Doggett and his wife Mary Ann (née Barnett). He immigrated as a young child with his parents to Brisbane where they settled in Fortitude Valley. He married Catherine Wood in 1878 in Brisbane.

Harry Doggett built his own home at Arthur Street, Fortitude Valley. Now known as Doggetts Cottage, it is listed on the Queensland Heritage Register.

Doggett had been doing work on his home (Doggetts Cottage) when he died suddenly on Thursday 16 June 1927 aged 74 years. He was buried in Toowong Cemetery on Monday 20 June 1927. His wife predeceased him in 1921; he was survived by his son Albert Doggett.

== See also ==
- List of mayors and lord mayors of Brisbane
