= Robert Porter (Brisbane politician) =

Australian politician

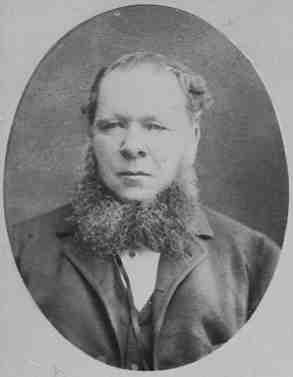

16th Mayor of Brisbane
- In office 1882–1882
- Preceded by: John Sinclair
- Succeeded by: Abram Byram

Personal details
- Born: 22 September 1825 London, England
- Died: 22 May 1902 (aged 76) Kangaroo Point, Queensland, Australia
- Resting place: Balmoral Cemetery
- Spouse: Sarah Martha Elizabeth Trowbridge (d. 1909)
- Children: 8
- Occupation: Contractor, mayor

Robert Porter (1825 – 1902) was an alderman and mayor of Brisbane Municipal Council, Queensland, Australia.

== Personal life ==
Robert Porter was born on 22 September 1825 in London, England.

Robert Porter married Sarah Martha Elizabeth Trowbridge (born about 1823–1824 in Salisbury, England). They arrived in Brisbane in 1860 and settled in the home, Corio, in Wharf Street, Kangaroo Point in which they lived for the rest of their lives. They had the following eight children:

- Sarah Jane Porter, born 1848 Folkestone, Kent, England, died 1937 Queensland
- Alice Edith Porter, born 1851 Kent, England, died Brisbane 1900
- Frederick Albert Lewis Porter, died 1946
- Marian Gertrude Porter, married to Thomas William Shackel in Brisbane on 3 December 1881, died 1937
- Flora Annie Porter, died 1943
- Catherine Ellen Porter, died 1943
- Mary Constance Porter, born in Brisbane on 6 September 1861, died 1934
- William Christopher Porter, born in Brisbane on 13 January 1865, died 1912

Robert Porter died at his home, Corio, Wharf Street, Kangaroo Point, Brisbane on 22 May 1902 aged 76 years. He had been ailing for some time prior to his death. He was buried at Balmoral Cemetery (also known as Bulimba Cemetery).

His wife Sarah died in March 1909.

== Business life ==
Robert Porter was a contractor, mostly in bridge and wharf construction in both the northern and southern parts of Queensland.

== Public life ==
Robert Porter was an alderman for the Ward of Kangaroo Point from 1867 (1868?) to 1870 and then again from 1880 to 1888 (1885?), during which time he was mayor in 1882. He served on the following committees:

- Improvement Committee 1868–1870, 1881.
- Legislative Committee 1868, 1869, 1882, 1884, 1888.
- Bridge Committee 1868–1870.
- Town Hall Committee 1868, 1869, 1885.
- Wharfage Committee 1881.
- Works Committee 1885, 1888.

In the Brisbane Municipal Council elections of 7 February 1888, Robert Porter was declared to have won the election for the East Ward by 5 votes. Voting at that time was done by crossing out the names of the undesired candidates. His opponent William McNaughton Galloway claimed that a number of votes were ruled informal by the returning officer because the voter had crossed out a part of his name but had crossed out all of the name of his opponent (Robert Porter); Galloway argued that these votes should have been counted as votes for him. The matter was adjudicated in the Supreme Court of Queensland on 15 February 1888 where the a panel of three judges decided that these disputed votes should be counted as votes for Galloway, thus electing him in the East Ward.

Robert Porter was a Member of Board of Waterworks 1893–1901, resigning only due to his failing health (he died in 1902).

Robert Porter was a Government representative on the Brisbane Fire Brigade Board for many years.

== See also ==
- List of mayors and lord mayors of Brisbane
