= Nelson D. Porter =

(1863–1961) Canadian businessman and politician; mayor of Ottawa

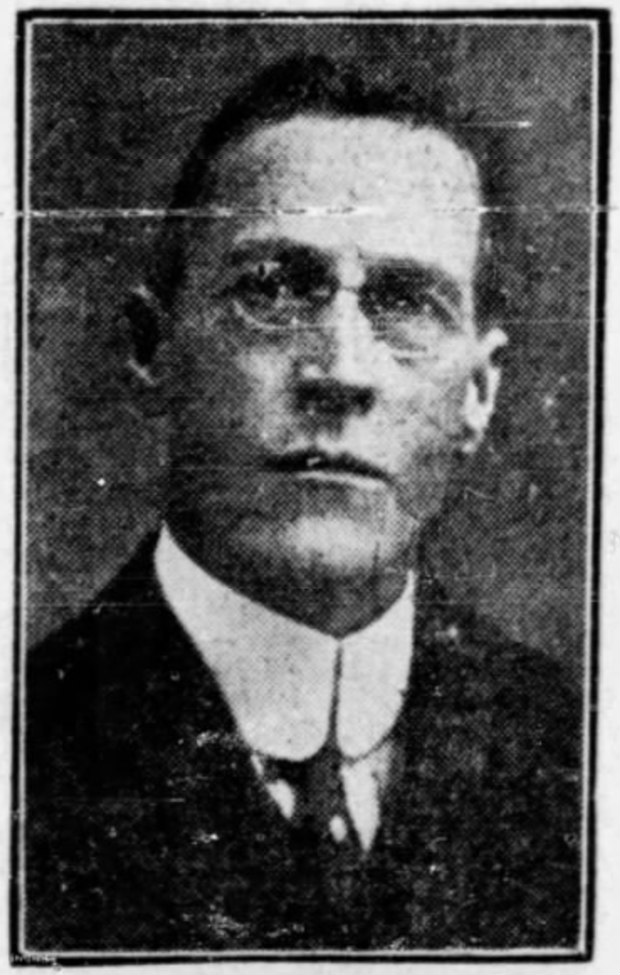
- Photo from Ottawa Citizen (Dec. 31, 1914)

35th Mayor of Ottawa
- In office 1915–1916
- Preceded by: Taylor McVeity
- Succeeded by: Harold Fisher

Personal details
- Born: November 28, 1863 Montreal, Canada East
- Died: February 12, 1961 (aged 97) Ottawa, Ontario, Canada

Nelson Davis Porter (November 28, 1863 – February 12, 1961) was mayor of Ottawa, Ontario, Canada from 1915 to 1916.

He was born in Montreal, Canada East in 1863 and came to Ottawa with his family in 1870. He worked as an insurance and real estate agent. During his term as mayor, a water pumping station was set up at Lemieux Island to supply water to the city.

He was also an amateur ice hockey player, and was an original member of the Ottawa Hockey Club. He played in their first competitive game in 1884 at the Montreal Winter Carnival Tournament and is credited with scoring their first goal.

He died in Ottawa in 1961 and was buried in the Beechwood Cemetery.

Preceded by Taylor McVeity	Mayor of Ottawa; 1915–1916	Succeeded by Harold Fisher
