= Edward Joseph Baines =

Australian politician

Edward Baines
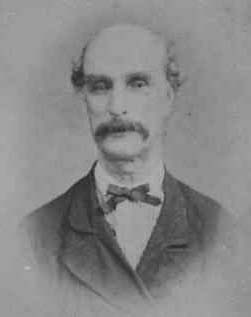

10th Mayor of Brisbane
- In office 1872–1872
- Preceded by: Francis Murray
- Succeeded by: James Swan

Personal details
- Born: Edward Joseph Baines; 1815
- Died: 29 February 1880 (aged 64–65) Kangaroo Point, Queensland, Australia
- Resting place: Toowong Cemetery
- Spouse: Maria Jane Schneider (m.1869)
- Occupation: Publican

Edward Joseph Baines (about 1815 – 1880) was an alderman and mayor of the Brisbane Municipal Council.

== Personal life ==
Edward Joseph Baines was born about 1815 (1819?).

Edward was married to Elizabeth Buchanan (daughter of David and Jane Buchanan), who died on 30 March 1863 at their home on Kangaroo Point Road.

Edward Joseph Baines married Maria Jane Schneider (possibly the widow of Louis Schneider?) in Brisbane on 1 June 1869. Maria was born on 25 May 1822 and died on 9 Oct 1919.

Edward Joseph Baines died on 29 February 1880 aged 61 (or 64?) years at his residence, the Pineapple Hotel at Kangaroo Point, Brisbane. Baines was buried in Toowong Cemetery. His wife Maria is memorialised on the headstone at Toowong cemetery, but she was buried with her subsequent husband Edward Ryan in the Paddington Cemetery (now under Suncorp Stadium). Her headstone was removed from the Paddington Cemetery to the Reserve behind Christ Church in 1913 but disappeared with another 503 headstones in 1930.

== Business life ==
Edward Joseph Baines was the hotelkeeper of the Pineapple Hotel at Kangaroo Point. His widow Maria took over the license after his death.

== Public life ==
Edward John Baines was an alderman 1868–1880. He was mayor in 1872. His political career ended with his death.

He served on the following committees:

- Finance Committee 1870, 1873, 1875, 1879.
- Town Hall Committee 1870.
- Improvement Committee 1871, 1872, 1874, 1878.
- Legislative Committee 1878.

== See also ==
- List of mayors and lord mayors of Brisbane
