= James Nicol Robinson =

Australia lawyer and politician

James Nicol Robinson was a lawyer and politician in Brisbane, Queensland, Australia. He was Mayor of Brisbane in 1900.
