= John Crase =

Australian businessman and politician

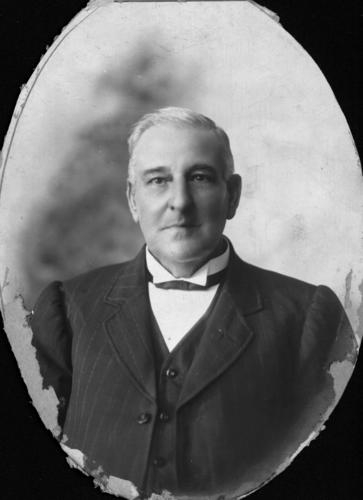
Photograph of Crase from 1915

John Crase (1837–25 May 1919) was an ironworker and businessman in Brisbane, Queensland, Australia. He was Mayor of Brisbane in 1906.

== Personal life ==
Crase was born in 1837 in St Ives, Cornwall, and emigrated to Queensland, arriving in 1859. He had at least two daughters, Annie Eileen, who did not survive infancy and who died in 1891, and Elisabeth, who was married in 1889.

== John Crase & Co. ==
Crase was in partnership with James H Phipps, the business being known as John Crase & Co. It was located in Warren Street, Valley.

== Political career ==
Crase first came to public attention as an outspoken opponent of federation in Queensland. A report in the Brisbane Courier from April 1899 accused Crase of "(seizing) the opportunity of making an effort to keep Queensland outside the federation," before concluding that "there need be no reason to fear the fate of the bill with such opponents as (Mr.) Crase".

He was first elected to the Brisbane City Council as an alderman for the Northern Ward in 1904. Party allegiances at the time were not strong in local politics, and for the most part aldermen were elected as non-partisan representatives. There is some evidence, however, that Crase had sympathies in line with those of the Protectionist Party, adopting as his motto "Australian Goods for Australian Men", and having chaired meetings for the Queensland branch of the Australian National Protectionist Union where Protectionist candidates were endorsed for election to Federal Parliament. Nonetheless, he opposed the introduction of party politics into municipal government, believing it to be unnecessary and counterproductive.

Crase was, during his time in office, widely considered to be an export on local government finance matters, and argued for numerous financial reforms in the way that government was run. In particular, he argued that it was "oppressive and unfair" for ratepayers to bear the complete cost of municipal government, given that non-property owners also benefited from municipal works, and opposed the expenditure of public money on public utilities wherever possible, referring to them as "experimental enterprises", and arguing that council had no reason to be competing with private businesses run by ratepayers. Nonetheless, he conceded that certain services could only be run effectively by the council (citing the provision of drinking water as an example), and argued that in these cases the public interest would best be served by council developing its own service delivery capacity, rather than relying on "lowest tenderer" contract labour.

In 1906, Crase was elected by his fellow aldermen as mayor of Brisbane. The position of Mayor at this time was not a popularly elected position, instead being selected by the aldermen from amongst its number. It was common for the position to rotate regularly amongst the aldermen during this period. Nonetheless, Crase was referred to as "well-regarded" by the Brisbane Courier upon his election, and he was elected unopposed to his alderman's seat in the same year.

Following his term as Mayor, Crase remained active in local government politics. He released a pamphlet entitled "Municipal Government" in 1908 that served as a political manifesto for his views on local government. He also vigorously advocated the "Greater Brisbane" doctrine, for the consolidation of the smaller municipal councils in the Brisbane region into a single, larger local government body. Crase would not live to see this happen though, dying in office in 1919.

== Death ==
Crase died on 1 June 1919.

== See also ==
- List of mayors and lord mayors of Brisbane
