= John Hetherington (mayor) =

John William Hetherington (1860 – 17 July 1929) was a miner and politician in Brisbane, Queensland, Australia. He was Mayor of Brisbane in 1910 and 1916–1917.

He was born in Brancepath, Durham, North England in 1860. He married Amelia Phillips and they had three sons and a daughter. In 1906 he was elected a member of the Brisbane City Council for Kangaroo Point, and he was three times Mayor of Brisbane, being appointed by the Governor-in-Council in 1910, and by his fellow aldermen in 1916 and 1917.

He was very involved in the mining industry: as a coal miner, coal merchant, inventor of safety equipment and in opening new coalfields.
