= Maurice Barry =

Maurice Joseph Barry (1885/6–1940) was a politician in Brisbane, Queensland, Australia. He was Mayor of Brisbane in 1924–1925.

== Life ==
Barry was born and educated in Ireland and came to Australia in 1901. He joined the Labour movement, and became president of the Federal executive of the Australian Labour Party. Later he became an alderman of the Brisbane City Council. He resigned to tour abroad, and was re-elected alderman on his return. He became first Labour Mayor of the city with a majority of 5000 votes, and was Mayor at the time of the city's centenary celebrations. His name is commemorated by Barry Parade, Fortitude Valley, Queensland.

Maurice Barry died aged 54 in Brisbane on 3 June 1940, at the Mater Misericordiae Private Hospital. He had been unwell for some time. .
