= William Murray Thompson =

Australian politician

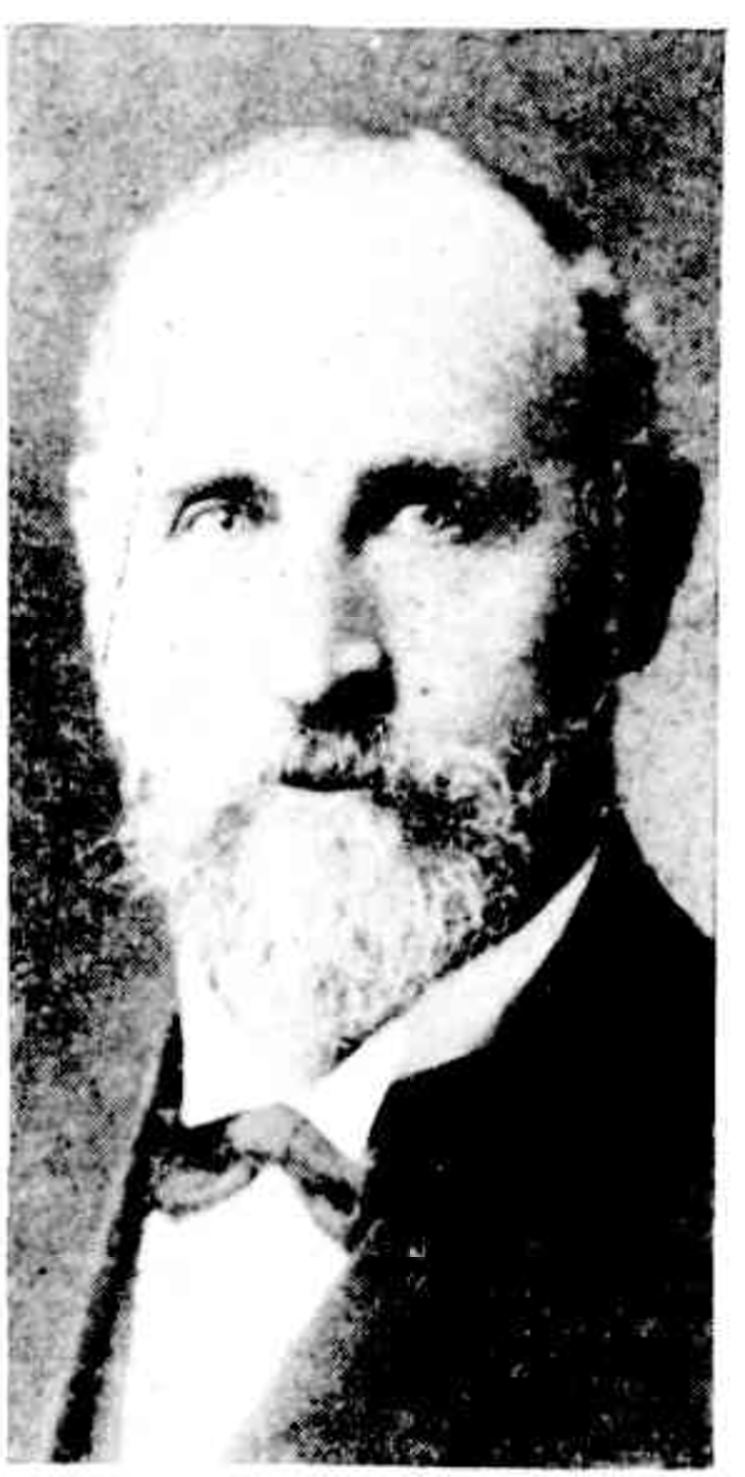
William Murray Thompson 1912

William Murray Thompson was a railway contractor and politician in Brisbane, Queensland, Australia. He was Mayor of Brisbane in 1907.

William Thompson was born at Tyrrell, in Cumberland, England on 6 April 1841.

He travelled to the gold diggings of New Zealand in the early 1860s and later travelled to Brisbane when gold was discovered in Gympie.

He was a successful railway contractor.

He died on 23 August 1912, at his home.
