= Lord Mayor of Brisbane =

Head of the Brisbane City Council

- Coat of Arms of Brisbane

- Flag of Brisbane

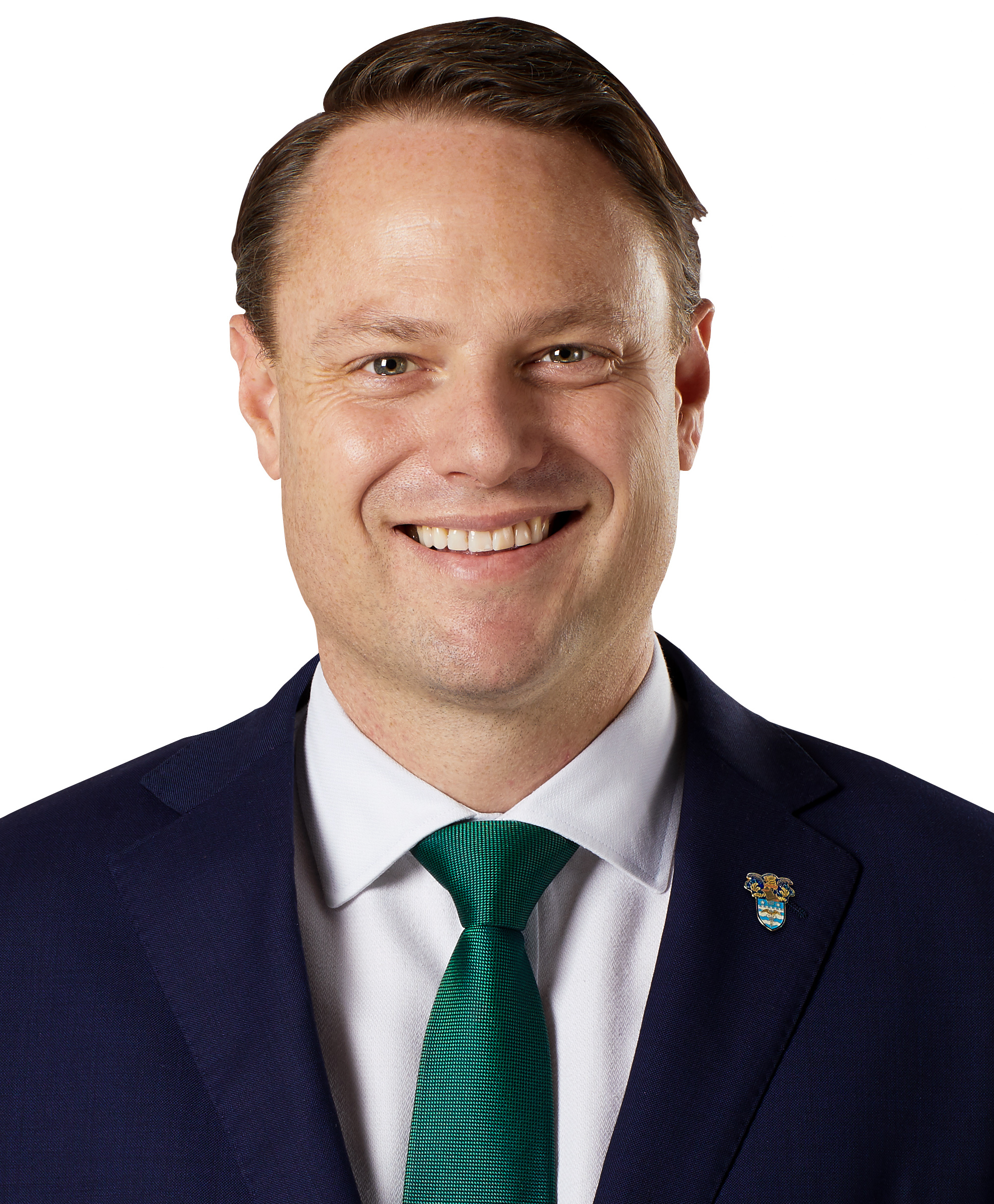
- Incumbent; Adrian Schrinner since 8 April 2019
- Style: The Right Honourable the Lord Mayor of Brisbane, Councillor
- Member of: Civic Cabinet
- Seat: Brisbane City Hall
- Appointer: Directly elected (optional preferential voting)
- Term length: 4 years (renewable)
- Inaugural holder: William Jolly
- Formation: 1 October 1925; 101 years ago
- Salary: A$377,394 (not including allowance)
- Website: www.brisbane.qld.gov.au

The Lord Mayor of Brisbane is the chief executive of the City of Brisbane, the capital of the Australian state of Queensland, and the head of the Brisbane City Council. Lord Mayor Adrian Schrinner of the Liberal National Party was sworn in on 8 April 2019, following the resignation of Graham Quirk.

The Lord Mayor serves a four-year term running concurrently with that of the City Council, and is elected by optional preferential voting. As Brisbane is by far the largest local government area in Australia, the Lord Mayor is elected by the largest single-member electorate in the Australia.

Like all mayors in Queensland, the Lord Mayor has broad executive powers and additional civic and ceremonial duties. The Lord Mayor is responsible for policy development, implementing policies enacted by the council, leading and controlling the business of council, preparing the budget and directing the chief executive and senior managers. The Lord Mayor also chairs the council's Civic Cabinet and is an ex officio member of all council committees.

== Mayors of the Brisbane Municipal Council (1859–1903) ==
The Town of Brisbane, established in 1859, was led by a mayor.

Mayor	Term
John Petrie	1859–1862
Thomas Blacket Stephens	1862
George Edmondstone	1863
Joshua Jeays	1864
Albert John Hockings (1st term)	1865
Richard Warry	1866
Albert John Hockings (2nd term)	1867
John Hardgrave	1868–1869
William Pettigrew	1870
Francis Murray	1871
Edward Joseph Baines	1872
James Swan	1873–1875
Richard Ash Kingsford	1876
Alfred Hubbard	1877–1878
John Daniel Heal	1879
John Sinclair	1880–1881
Robert Porter	1882
Abram Robertson Byram	1883
John McMaster (1st term)	1884
Benjamin Harris Babbidge	1885
James Hipwood	1886–1887
Richard Southall	1888
William McNaughton Galloway	1889
John McMaster (2nd term)	1890
John Allworth Clark	1891
George Watson	1892
John McMaster (3rd term)	1893
Robert Fraser	1894–1895
Robert Woods Thurlow	1896
John McMaster (4th term)	1897
William Thorne	1898
William Andrew Seal	1899
James Nicol Robinson	1900
Thomas Proe (1st term)	1901
Leslie Corrie	1902–1903

== Mayors of the Brisbane City Council (1903–1925) ==
The City of Brisbane, established in 1903, replaced the Town of Brisbane and was led by a mayor.

Mayor	Term	Party
Leslie Corrie	1903	
Thomas Rees	1904	
Thomas Proe (2nd term)	1905	
John Crase	1906	
William Murray Thompson	1907	
Charles Packenham Buchanan (1st term)	1908	
Thomas Wilson	1909	
John Hetherington (1st term)	1910	
Harry Diddams (1st term)	1911	
Alfred John Raymond	1912	
Harry Doggett	1913	
Charles Moffatt Jenkinson	1914	
George Down	1915	
John Hetherington (2nd term)	1916–1917	
John McMaster (5th term)	1918–1919	
Charles Packenham Buchanan (2nd term)	1919–1919	
James Francis Maxwell	1920–1921	National
Harry Diddams (2nd term)	1921–1924	
Maurice Barry	1924–1925	Labor
Thomas Wilson (2nd term)	1925	Labor

== Lord Mayors of the Brisbane City Council ==
The new City of Brisbane, established in 1925, replaced the former City of Brisbane and is led by the Lord Mayor.

=== 1925–present ===
No.	Portrait	Mayor	Party	Term start	Term end	Council control (term)
1		William Jolly (1881−1955)	United	1925	24 February 1931	
2		Archibald Watson (1874−1941)	Nationalist Civic	24 February 1931	11 May 1931	
3		John William Greene (1876−1959)	Progressive	11 May 1931	1934	
4		Alfred James Jones (1871−1945)	Labor	1934	1940	
5		John Beals Chandler (1887−1962)	Citizens' Municipal Organisation	1940	1952	
6		Frank Roberts (1913−1992)	Labor	1952	1955	
7		Reg Groom (1906−1987)	Citizens' Municipal Organisation	1955	1961	
8		Clem Jones (1918−2007)	Labor	1961	1975	
9		Bryan Walsh	Labor	1975	1976	
10		Frank Sleeman (1915−2000)	Labor	1976	1982	
11		Roy Harvey (1921−2006)	Labor	1982	1985	
12		Sallyanne Atkinson (b. 1942)	Liberal	1985	1991	
13		Jim Soorley (b. 1951)	Labor	1991	2003	
14		Tim Quinn (b. 1949)	Labor	2003	27 March 2004	
15		Campbell Newman (b. 1963)	Liberal	27 March 2004	15 March 2008	Labor majority (2004–2008)
15		Campbell Newman (b. 1963)	Liberal	15 March 2008	26 July 2008	Liberal majority (2008)
(15)		Campbell Newman (b. 1963)	Liberal National	26 July 2008	3 April 2011	LNP majority (2008–present)
16		Graham Quirk (b. c. 1958)	Liberal National	3 April 2011	8 April 2019	LNP majority (2008–present)
17		Adrian Schrinner (b. 1977)	Liberal National	8 April 2019	incumbent	LNP majority (2008–present)

== Historical party names ==
Prior to 1976, conservative councillors stood on a variety of different platforms: the United Party, Nationalist Citizens Party, Civic Reform League, the Citizens' Municipal Organisation, the Liberal Civic Party and the Brisbane Civic Party.

The United Party and its successor the Nationalist Citizens Party were created as the vehicle for conservative candidates to campaign against Labor candidates in the newly formed Brisbane City Council, without formally acknowledging their links to the main conservative party of the time. The Nationalist Citizens Party was doomed when the very conservative Civic Reform League was created on 12 December 1930. That saw most of the conservative councillors from the Nationalist Citizens Party, led by Acting Mayor Watson, defect to the Civic Reform League, which failed to win the subsequent elections. The Progress Party was created at the same time and, in the 1931 election, saw only three of its candidates win, including John Greene, who became Lord Mayor as a compromise candidate amongst the 20 alderman.

The Citizens' Municipal Organisation (CMO) was ostensibly a non-partisan grouping, but was informally aligned with the United Australian Party and then, after 1944, the newly formed Liberal Party. The CMO was formed on 23 June 1936 and was the platform for the election campaigns of Sir John Chandler and Sir Reg Groom. Finally, in the 1976 election, the Liberal Party began to contest Brisbane municipal elections under its own name.

== Electoral results ==
=== 2024 ===
2024 Queensland mayoral elections: Brisbane
Party	Candidate	Votes	%	±%
Liberal National	Adrian Schrinner	343,330	48.59	+0.85
Labor	Tracey Price	186,250	26.36	−4.58
Greens	Jonathan Sriranganathan	137,454	19.45	+4.05
Legalise Cannabis	Clive Brazier	23,580	3.34	+3.34
Independent	Bruce Tanti	10,070	1.43	+1.43
Independent	Gilbert Holmes	5,958	0.84	+0.84
Total formal votes		706,642	97.97	+0.66
Informal votes		14,656	2.03	−0.66
Turnout		721,298	85.31	
Two-party-preferred result
Liberal National	Adrian Schrinner	362,411	56.35	+0.03
Labor	Tracey Price	280,696	43.65	−0.03
Liberal National hold		Swing	+0.03	

=== 2020 ===
2020 Queensland mayoral elections: Brisbane
Party	Candidate	Votes	%	±%
Liberal National	Adrian Schrinner	292,895	47.74	−5.64
Labor	Pat Condren	189,832	30.94	−1.02
Greens	Kath Angus	94,481	15.40	+5.0
Animal Justice	Karagh-Mae Kelly	19,022	3.10	+3.10
Civil Liberties & Motorists	Jeff Hodges	5,502	0.90	−1.20
Independent	Frank Jordan	4,008	0.65	+0.65
Independent	John Dobinson	3,461	0.56	+0.56
Independent	Ben Gorringe	2,270	0.37	+0.37
Independent	Jarrod Wirth	2,065	0.34	−0.16
Total formal votes		613,536		
Informal votes		16,425		
Turnout		629,961		
Two-party-preferred result
Liberal National	Adrian Schrinner	306,905	56.32	−2.99
Labor	Pat Condren	237,988	43.68	+2.99
Liberal National hold		Swing	−2.99	

=== 2016 ===
2016 Queensland mayoral elections: Brisbane
Party	Candidate	Votes	%	±%
Liberal National	Graham Quirk	325,714	53.38	−8.56
Labor	Rod Harding	195,055	31.96	+6.80
Greens	Ben Pennings	63,483	10.40	−0.30
Consumer Rights	Jeffrey Hodges	12,960	2.12	+2.12
People Decide	Karel Boele	5,195	0.85	+0.85
Independent	Jim Eldridge	4,764	0.78	+0.78
Independent	Jarrod Wirth	3,063	0.50	+0.50
Total formal votes		610,234		
Informal votes		15,287		
Turnout		625,521		
Two-party-preferred result
Liberal National	Graham Quirk	336,450	59.31	−9.19
Labor	Rod Harding	230,841	40.69	+9.19
Liberal National hold		Swing		

=== 2012 ===
2012 Queensland mayoral elections: Brisbane
Party	Candidate	Votes	%	±%
Liberal National	Graham Quirk	333,637	61.94	+1.87
Labor	Ray Smith	135,534	25.16	−3.85
Greens	Andrew Bartlett	57,641	10.70	+2.32
Sex Party	Rory Killen	7,125	1.32	+1.32
Independent	Chris Carson	4,733	0.88	+0.88
Total formal votes		538,670		
Informal votes		11,778		
Turnout		550,448		
Two-party-preferred result
Liberal National	Graham Quirk	340,464	68.53	+2.43
Labor	Ray Smith	156,357	31.47	−2.43
Liberal National hold		Swing	+2.43	

=== 2008 ===
2008 Queensland mayoral elections: Brisbane
Party	Candidate	Votes	%	±%
Liberal	Campbell Newman	335,076	60.07	+12.87
Labor	Greg Rowell	161,845	29.01	−11.59
Greens	Jo-Anne Bragg	46,733	8.38	−1.82
Independent	Robert Campbell	8,439	1.51	+1.51
Independent	Louise Day	1,801	0.32	+0.32
Independent	Bryan Crawford	1,331	0.24	+0.24
Independent	David Alan Couper	952	0.17	+0.17
Independent	James Patrick Sinnamon	856	0.15	+0.15
Independent	Derek Rosborough	773	0.14	+0.14
Total formal votes		557,806		
Informal votes		9,618		
Turnout		567,424		
Two-party-preferred result
Liberal	Campbell Newman		66.1	+13.7
Labor	Greg Rowell		33.9	−13.7
Liberal hold		Swing	+13.7	
