= Town of Brisbane =

Local government area of Queensland, Australia

Coordinates: 27.467°S 153.021°E

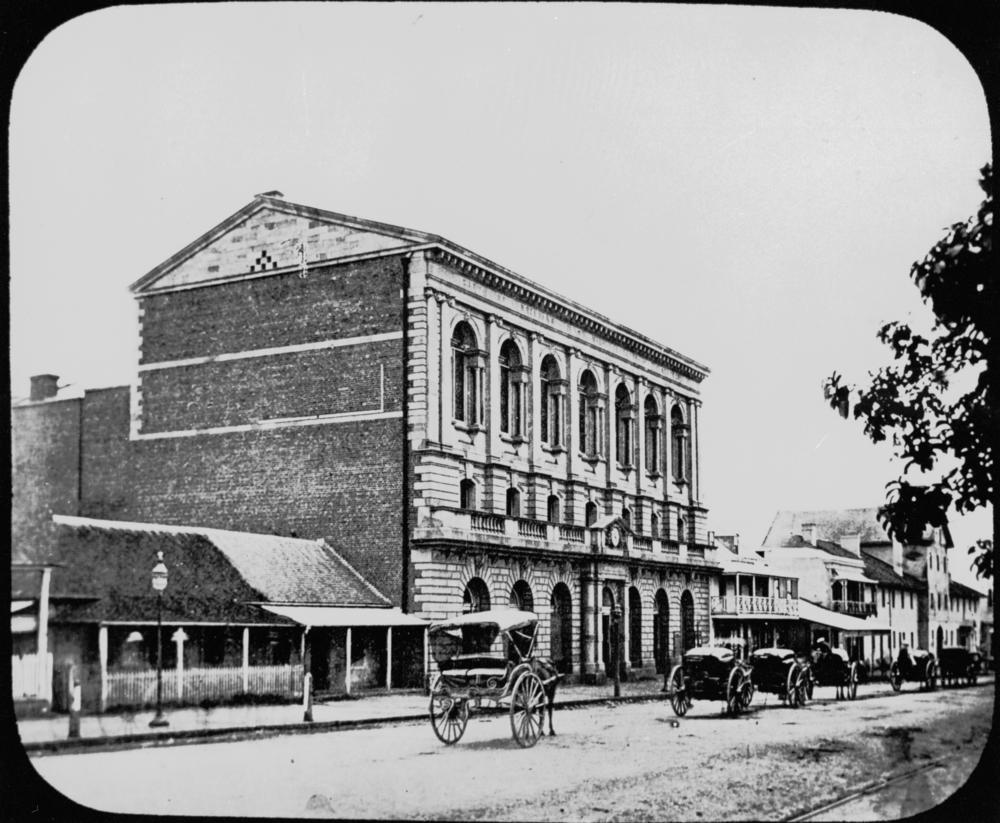
Brisbane's first Town Hall, ca. 1870

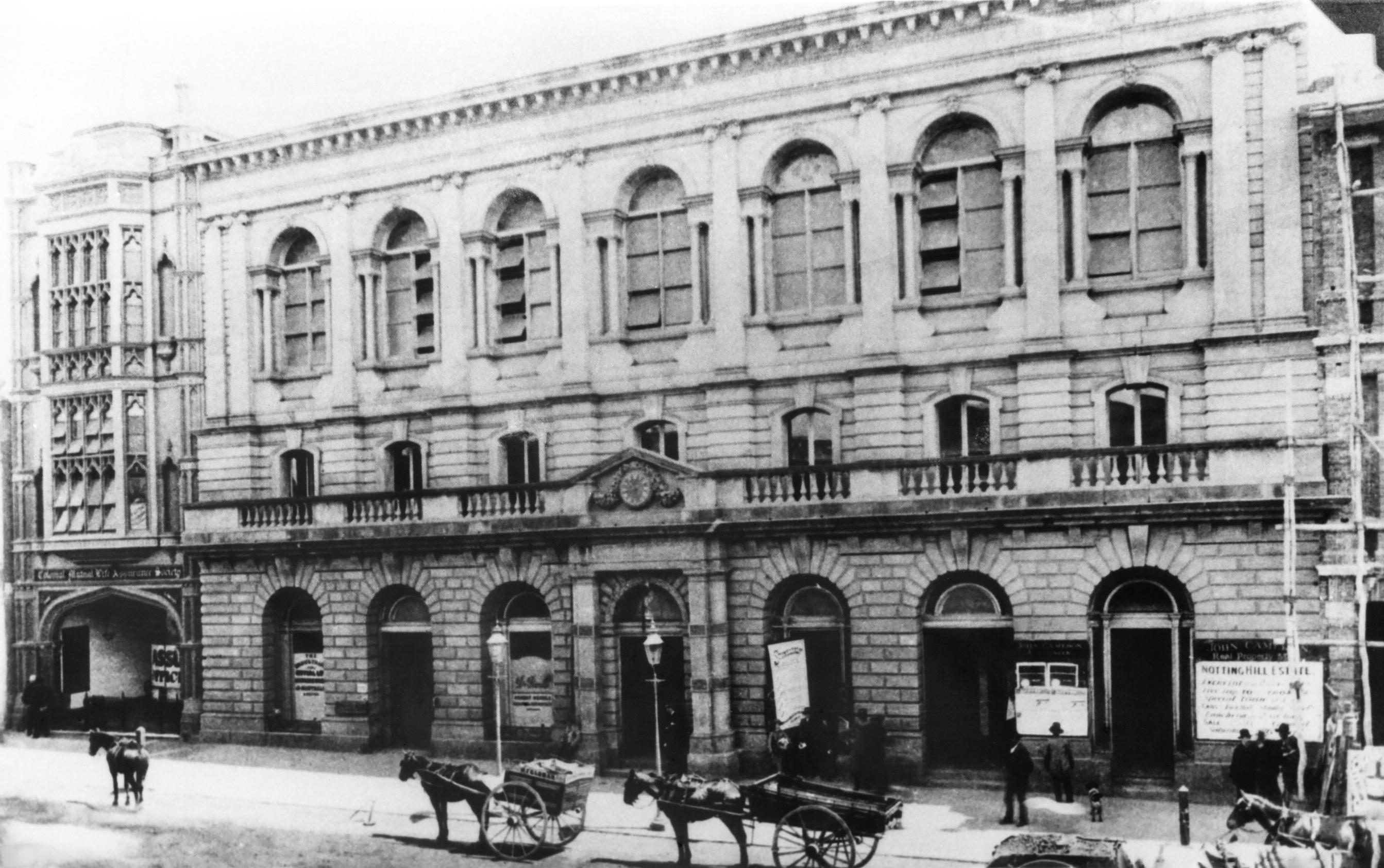
Front facade of the first Brisbane Town Hall at 66-76 Queen Street, circa 1885

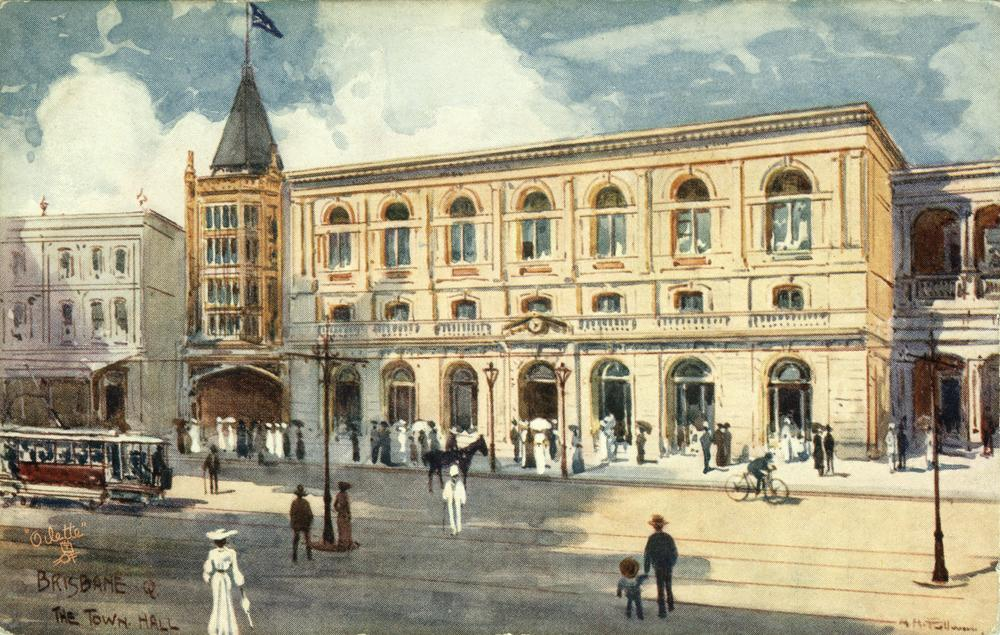
Early street scene featuring Brisbane's first Town Hall, circa 1895

The Town of Brisbane was a local government area of Brisbane in Queensland, Australia from 1859 to 1903. It was later elevated to city status and was the City of Brisbane from 1903 until it was amalgamated into the City of Greater Brisbane in 1925.

== History ==
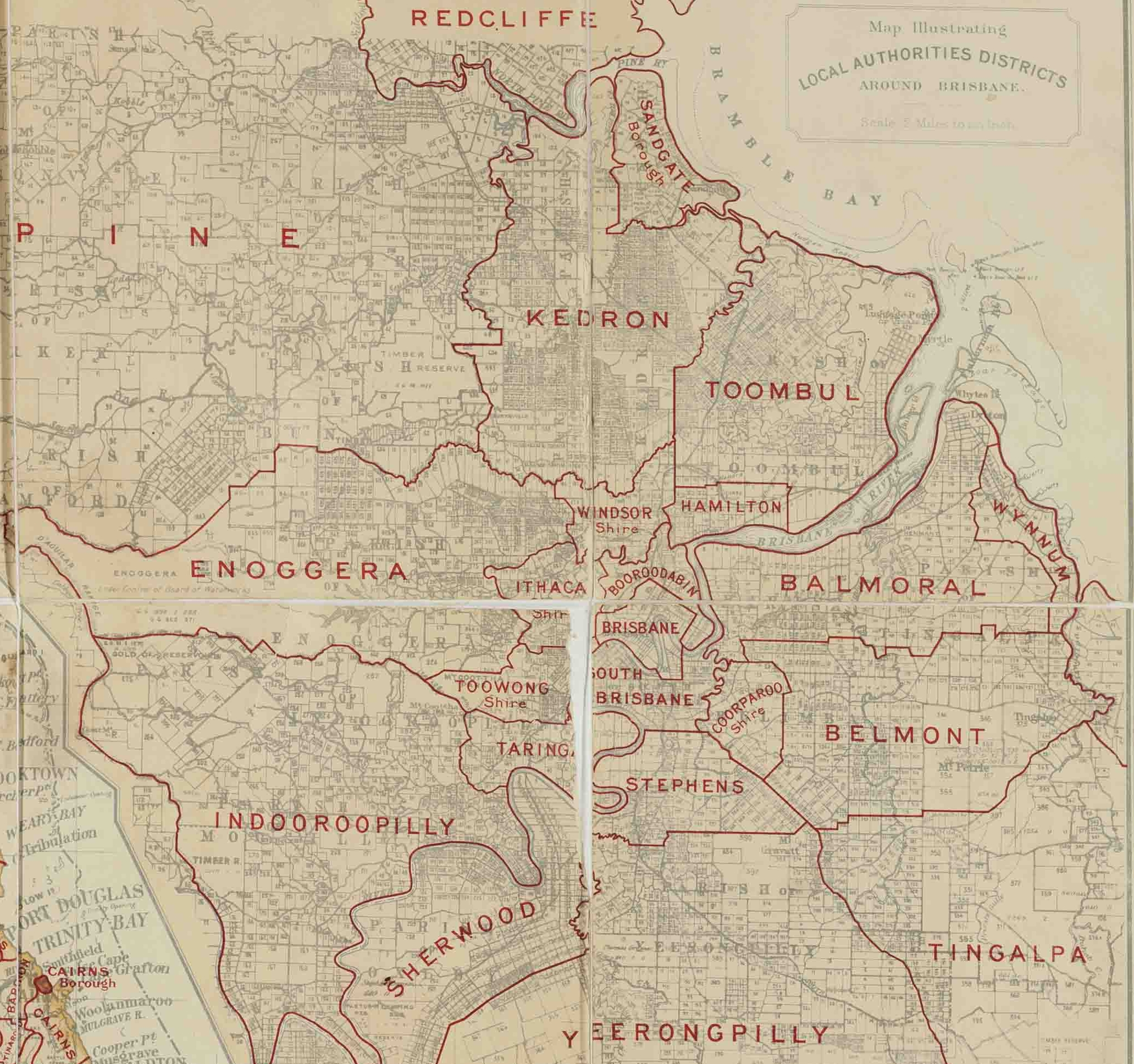
Map of Borough of Brisbane and adjacent local government areas, March 1902.

The Municipality of Brisbane was gazetted on 25 May 1859 and proclaimed by the Governor of New South Wales on 7 September 1859. The first local government area in Queensland, Brisbane was the only one incorporated prior to the establishment of Queensland as a separate colony.

After the passing of the Municipal Institutions Act 1864 the area could establish a municipal council to administer the district – with powers relating to by-laws, to rating, to borrowings, to the control or regulation of public infrastructure and utilities, and to the provision of public amenities such as gardens and hospitals. The council was led by a mayor and the role was generally rotated among the aldermen. Thus many mayors served for only one year and some served multiple times some years apart. The council "year" commenced and ended in about February to avoid a change-over during the summer holidays, so the mayor for 1890 would, strictly speaking, be the mayor into early 1891. Most of the early aldermen and mayors of the Municipality of Brisbane were prominent local men rather than representatives of political parties.

The foundation stone of Brisbane's first town hall in Queen Street was laid on 28 January 1864 by Queensland Governor George Bowen. It was designed by William Coote. It cost £25,000 at a time when the income of the Town was less than £60,000 a year.

On 7 January 1888, a separate Town of South Brisbane was created out of the South Ward of the Municipality of Brisbane (together with the Woolloongabba Division).

On 13 January 1903, the Booroodabin Division was abolished and absorbed into the Town of Brisbane.

The Local Authorities Act 1902 consolidated local government and established two classes: Towns and Shires, with the additional provision for Towns to be proclaimed as Cities. Accordingly, Brisbane municipality was proclaimed the City of Brisbane from the date of commencement of the Act, 31 March 1903, and its governing body became the Brisbane City Council.

Brisbane's first sewerage treatment plant was officially opened at Luggage Point on 23 November 1923. It was Australia's first full-scale sewerage treatment plant, a key component of Brisbane's sewerage scheme which commended in March 1914. It was serviced by an electric tramway.

In 1925, the City of Brisbane was amalgamated with a number of surrounding towns and shires to create the City of Greater Brisbane, now simply known as City of Brisbane.

The first Brisbane town hall was used until January 1928, after which the business of the City of Brisbane was conducted from the new (almost completed) Brisbane City Hall.

== See also ==
- List of mayors and lord mayors of Brisbane
