= Anning Monument =

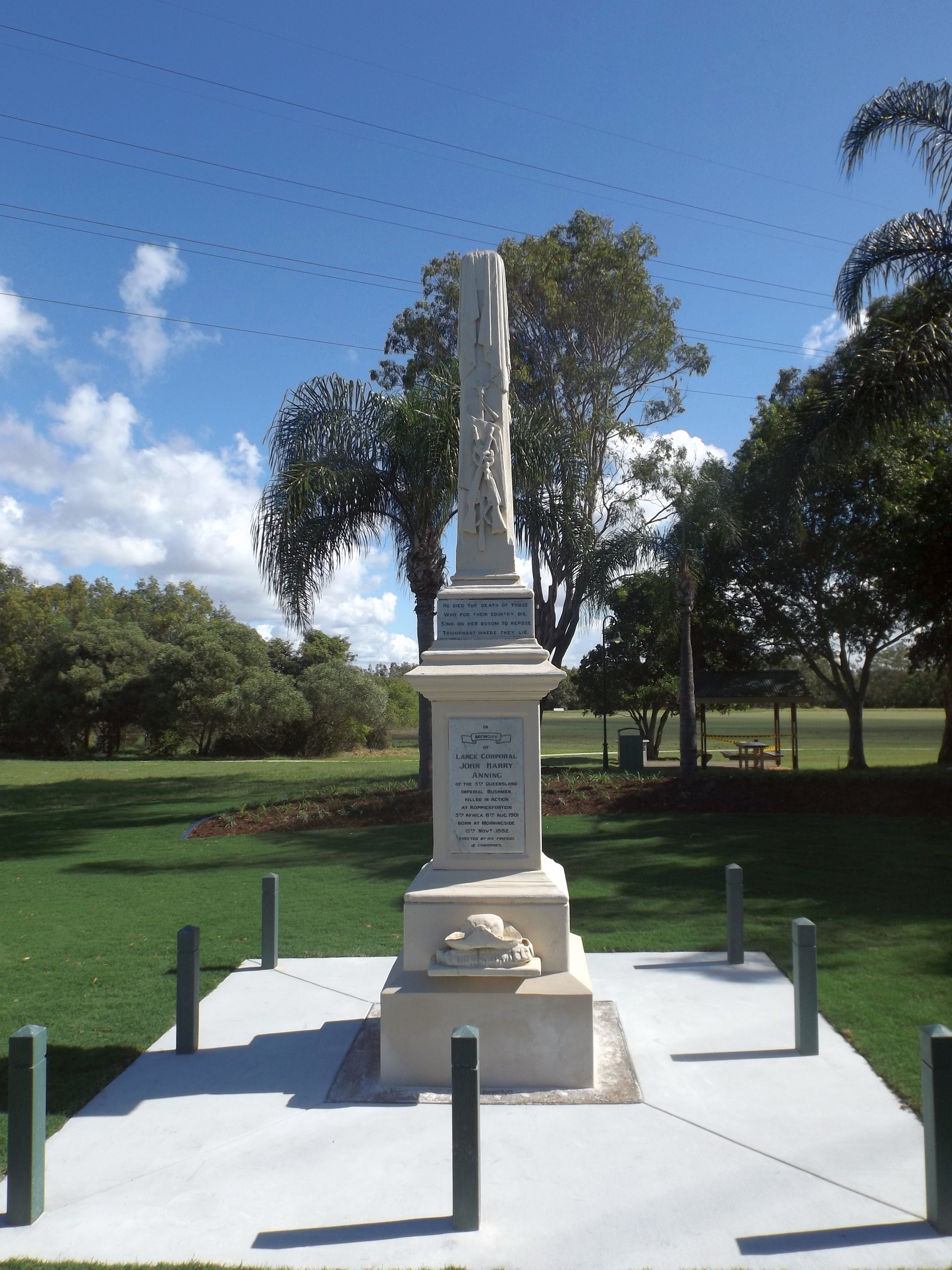
- War memorial and park, 2015

- Location within Queensland Location within Australia
- 27.4504°S 153.1259°E
- Location: corner of Hemmant and Tingalpa Road and Boonoo Street, Hemmant, City of Brisbane, Queensland, Australia

History
- Design period: 1900–14 (early 20th century)
- Built: 1903

Site notes
- Architect: William Busby

Queensland Heritage Register
- Official name: Anning Monument (Boer War Memorial), Hemmant Boer War Memorial
- Type: state heritage (built)
- Designated: 21 October 1992
- Reference no.: 600220
- Significant period: 1903-(social); 1903 (fabric); 1903–68 (historical)
- Significant components: memorial surrounds/railings, memorial – obelisk
- Builders: William Busby

Anning Monument is a heritage-listed memorial at the corner of Hemmant and Tingalpa Road and Boonoo Street, Hemmant, City of Brisbane, Queensland, Australia. It was designed and built by William Busby in 1903. It is also known as Hemmant Boer War Memorial. It was added to the Queensland Heritage Register on 21 October 1992.

== History ==
The Anning Monument was unveiled on 14 March 1903 by Colonel Thomas Price. It was designed and executed by monumental mason William Busby of Toowong, Brisbane.

The stone memorial honours local man, Lance Corporal John Harry Anning of the 5th Queensland Imperial Bushmen. The memorial was erected by his friends and comrades with the help of a public subscription after he was killed in action at Koffiefontein, South Africa on 6 August 1901 at the age of eighteen.

It was originally sited at the junction of Lytton and Hemmant Roads, but was re-sited in 1968 after it was hit by a car.

The Anning memorial was constructed at an early phase of the history of war memorials in the state. After the First World War, the construction of war memorials was prolific. In 1903, when this memorial was unveiled, they were still quite rare.

Australian war memorials are valuable evidence of imperial and national loyalties, at the time not seen as conflicting; the skills of local stonemasons, metalworkers and architects; and of popular taste.

Although there are now many different types of memorials throughout Queensland there are few Boer War Memorials. Amongst these, other Brisbane memorials include the Caskey Monument (1902) in Toowong Cemetery, the Berry and MacFarlane Monument (1902) at Sherwood and the South African War Memorial (1919) in Anzac Square, Brisbane.

== Description ==
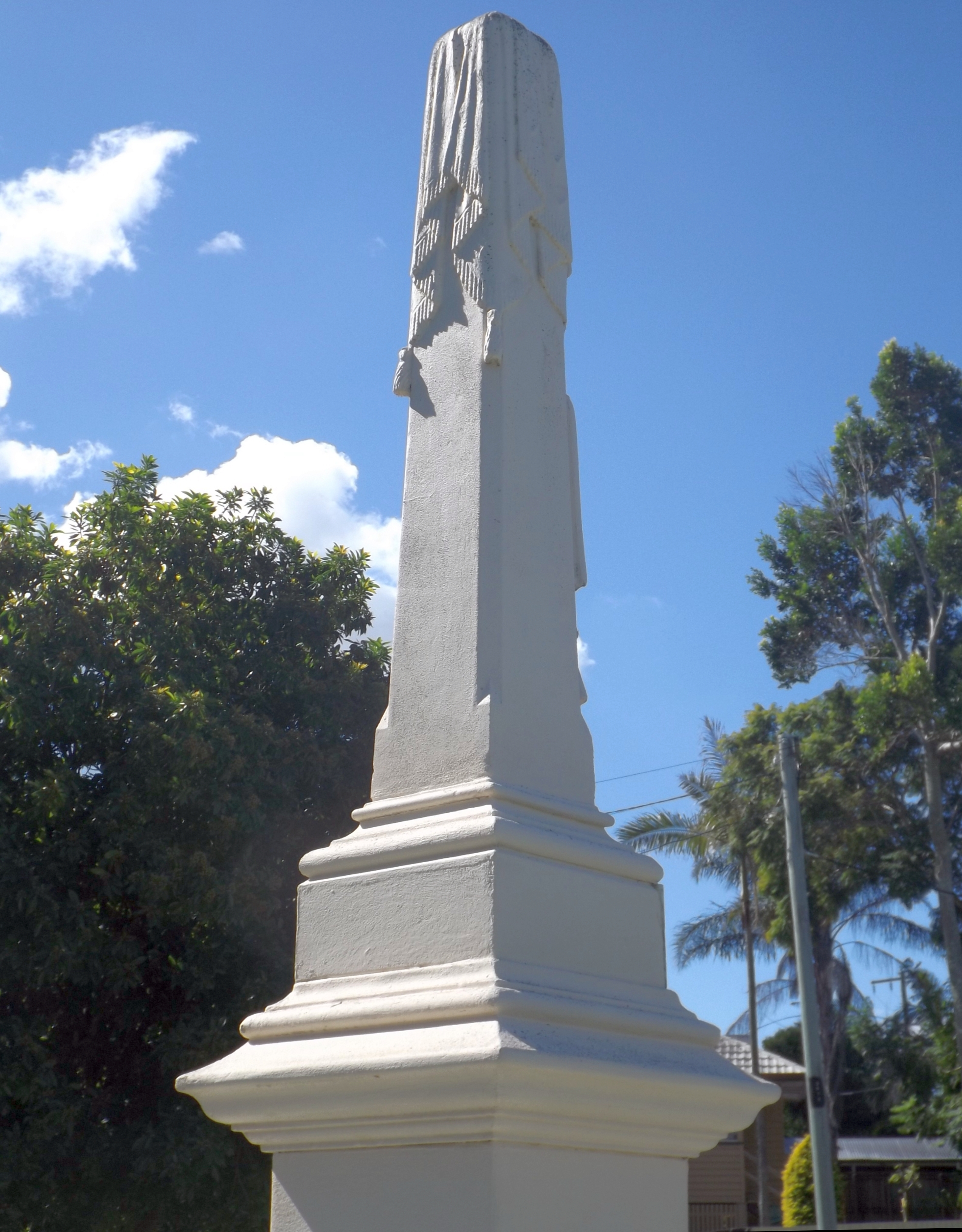
Detail, 2015

The Boer War Memorial is situated in a large park in Hemmant. It sits beside a grassed playing area in front of a group of children's swings.

The sandstone memorial comprises a base and pedestal surmounted by an obelisk. It sits on a concrete pad and is surrounded by evenly spaced metal posts linked by a metal chain.

The base is a smooth faced step with a chamfered top edge. Surmounting this is the pedestal plinth which is smooth faced and capped with large cyma recta mouldings. The front face displays a high relief carving of a trooper's hat and bandolier. Rising from the plinth is the pedestal dado. It is a square pillar with recessed panels on each side. The front face has a leaded marble plaque set into the recess bearing an inscription to Lance Corporal John Harry Anning. The dado is capped by a large cornice made up of a number of cyma recta and torus mouldings.

Projecting from the pedestal is the obelisk. It sits on a plinth capped with cyma recta and torus mouldings and also has a leaded marble plaque on the front face. It bears another inscription to Lance Corporal Anning.

The obelisk has a relief carved tasselled shroud draped over the top, symbolising death and mourning. Below the shroud are relief carved crossed rifles, bound with cord and resting on a banner. The banner hangs from a staff with a small crown at the top.

== Heritage listing ==
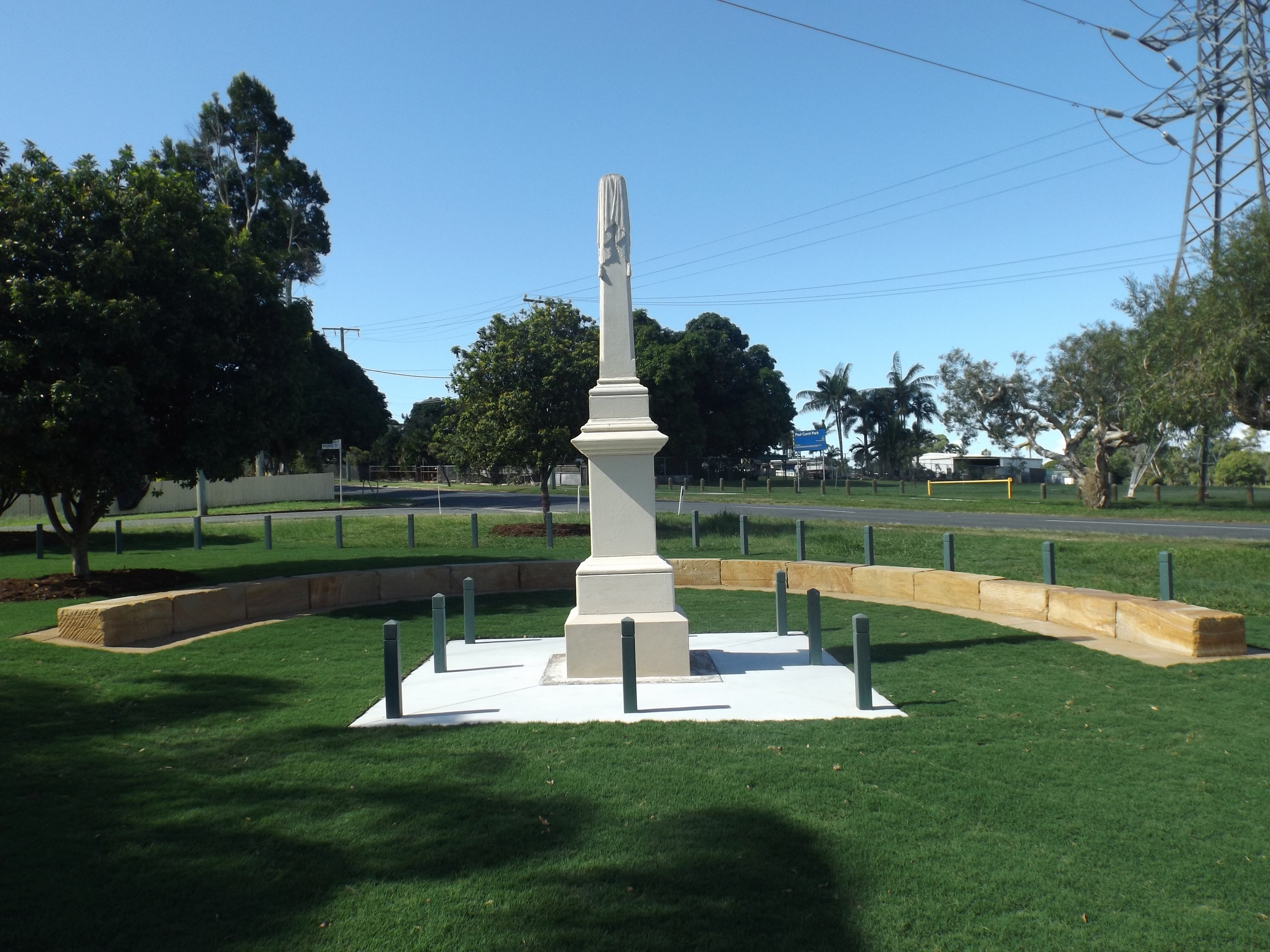
Monument and park, 2015

The Anning Monument was listed on the Queensland Heritage Register on 21 October 1992 having satisfied the following criteria.

The place is important in demonstrating the evolution or pattern of Queensland's history.

War Memorials are important in demonstrating the pattern of Queensland's history as they are representative of a recurrent theme that involved most communities throughout the state. They provide evidence of an era of widespread Australian patriotism and nationalism, particularly during and following the First World War. The monuments manifest a unique documentary record and are demonstrative of popular taste in the inter-war period. The memorial was constructed at an early phase of the history of war memorials in the state.

The place demonstrates rare, uncommon or endangered aspects of Queensland's cultural heritage.

The monuments manifest a unique documentary record and are demonstrative of popular taste in the inter-war period. It is an uncommon example of a memorial erected in memory of a single soldier.

The place is important in demonstrating the principal characteristics of a particular class of cultural places.

The Boer War Memorial is an important Queensland monument. It is one of the few memorials in Queensland to commemorate the involvement and death of Queensland soldiers in the Boer War of 1899–1902. After the First World War, memorials were erected in most Queensland towns, however in 1903, when this memorial was unveiled, they were still quite rare. It is an uncommon example of a memorial erected in memory of a single soldier. The memorial at Hemmant demonstrates the principal characteristics of a commemorative structure erected as an enduring record of a major historical event. This is achieved through the appropriate use of various symbolic elements including a shroud, crossed rifles, and obelisk

The place is important because of its aesthetic significance.

The Boer War Memorial is of aesthetic significance for its high level of workmanship and design.

The place has a strong or special association with a particular community or cultural group for social, cultural or spiritual reasons.

It has a strong and continuing association with the community as evidence of the impact of a major historic event and as the focal point for the remembrance of that event.

The place has a special association with the life or work of a particular person, group or organisation of importance in Queensland's history.

It also has special association with Brisbane monumental mason, William Busby as an example of his work
