= Berry and MacFarlane Monument =

Memorial in Sherwood, Queensland, Australia

Berry & MacFarlane Monument
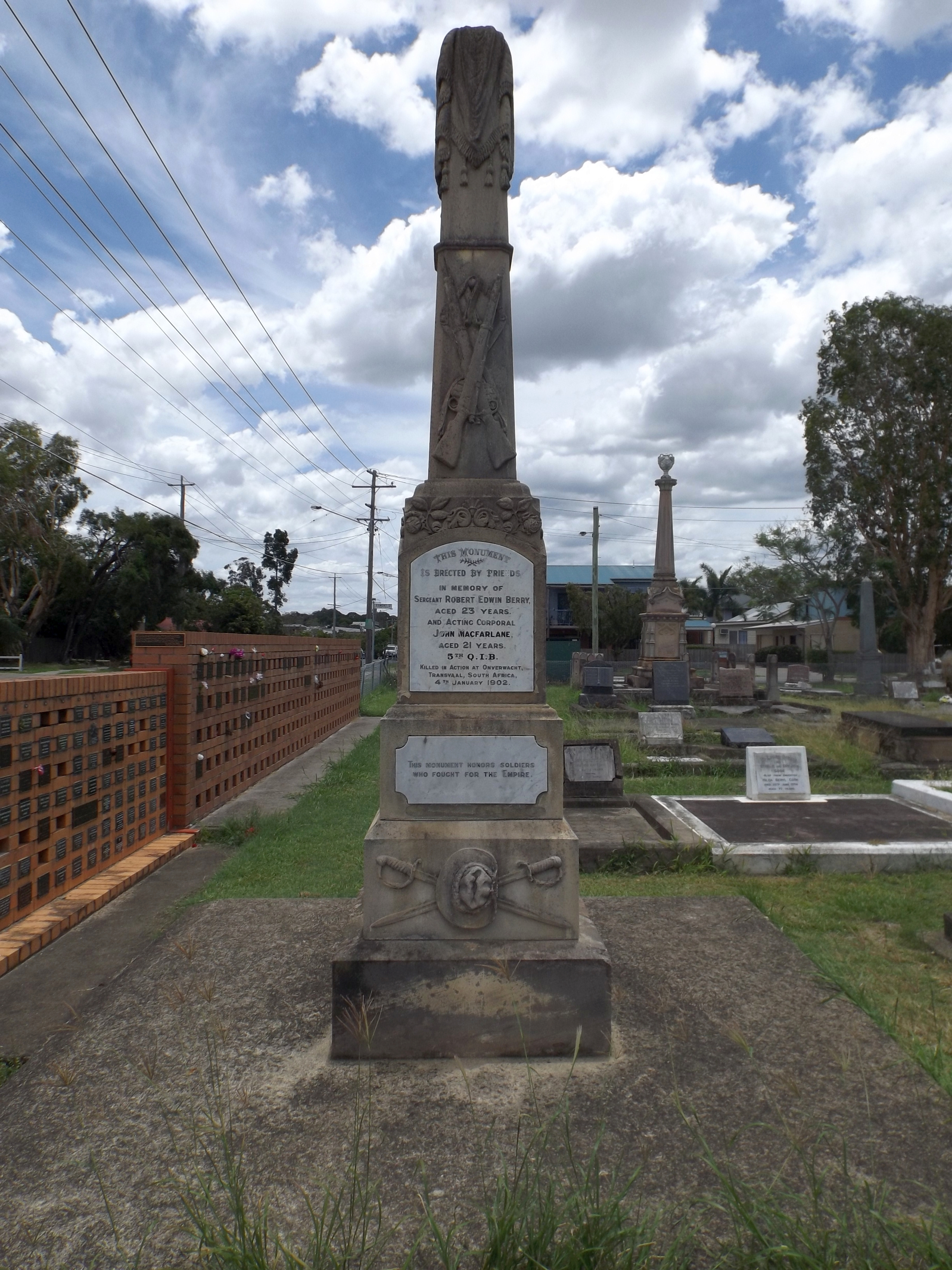
- Memorial in 2014

- Location within Queensland Location within Australia
- 27.533°S 152.9874°E
- Location: Sherwood Road, Sherwood, Queensland, Australia

History
- Design period: 1900–1914 (early 20th century)
- Built: 1902

Queensland Heritage Register
- Official name: Berry & MacFarlane Monument
- Type: state heritage (built)
- Designated: 21 October 1992
- Reference no.: 600292
- Significant period: 1902– (social); 1902 (fabric)
- Significant components: memorial – obelisk

Berry & MacFarlane Monument is a heritage-listed memorial at Sherwood Road, Sherwood, Queensland, Australia. It was built in 1902. It was added to the Queensland Heritage Register on 21 October 1992.

== History ==
This monument was erected in July 1902 by friends of two young soldiers, Sergeant Robert Edwin Berry (aged 23 years) and Acting Corporal John MacFarlane (aged 21 years), who were killed in action at Onverwacht in the Republic of Transvaal on 4 January 1902. The Berry family had long been resident in the Sherwood district, and were closely associated with St Matthew's Anglican Church in Sherwood Road (destroyed by fire in 1921).

Both young men were members of the 5th Queensland Imperial Bushmen and, like all Australian troops participating in the South African War (Boer War) of 1899–1902, were volunteers. As members of the QIB, however, they were under British command, and their pay was issued by the colonial government at English cavalrymen's rates.

The monument was carved by the masonry firm of W. Batstone & Sons of South Brisbane, and was erected in the grounds of St Matthew's Anglican Church and Cemetery at Sherwood. The monument was unveiled by the Queensland Premier, Robert Philp, on Saturday 21 June 1902.

It is one of few South African War monuments erected in Queensland. Amongst these, other Brisbane memorials include the Caskey Monument (1902) in Toowong Cemetery, the Anning Monument (1903) at Hemmant and the South African War Memorial (1919) in Anzac Square, Brisbane.

== Description ==
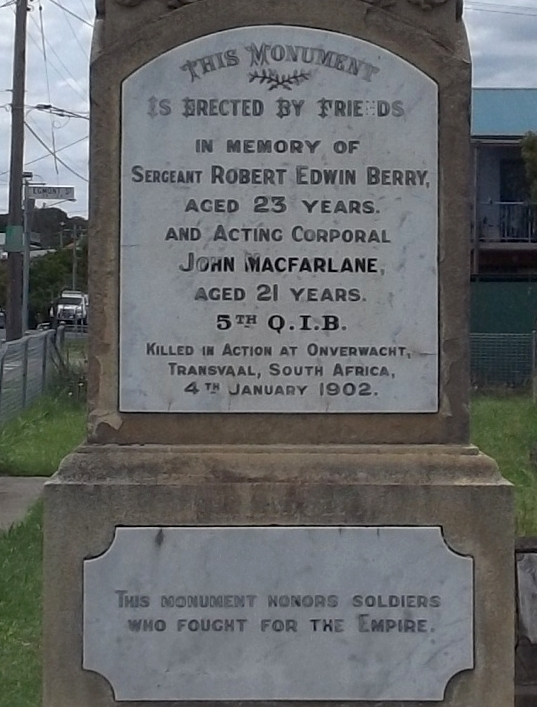
Plaques, 2014

The sandstone monument is located near the front entrance gate of the Sherwood Anglican Cemetery, facing east.

It stands 15 feet 3 inches (4.65 m) high, and consists of a pedestal on a stepped sandstone base, rising to an obelisk draped by a tasselled shroud. Crossed rifles are carved in relief on the front face of the obelisk, which features a small cornice midway. The pedestal has two inscribed, leaded marble plates, and is ornamented with a trooper's hat and crossed swords in high relief at the base, and a rose and leaf design around the top.

The pedestal shows signs of spalling at the base, partly caused by the monument having been painted, and the relief detail is weathered. Originally the monument was surrounded by a stone kerbing and six posts linked by rails, with marble chips inside the border. The memorial now stands borderless and within two metres of the more recently erected columbarium.

== Heritage listing ==
Berry & MacFarlane Monument was listed on the Queensland Heritage Register on 21 October 1992 having satisfied the following criteria.

The place is important in demonstrating the evolution or pattern of Queensland's history.

The Berry & MacFarlane Monument at Sherwood, erected in 1902, is significant historically as an expression of emergent Australian nationalism in the earliest years of federation.

The place demonstrates rare, uncommon or endangered aspects of Queensland's cultural heritage.

It is a rare Queensland South African War monument, and a unique source of historical information.

The place is important because of its aesthetic significance.

It is a skilfully executed example of its type, and a good example of the work of prominent Brisbane monumental masons W. Batstone & Sons.

The place has a special association with the life or work of a particular person, group or organisation of importance in Queensland's history.

It is a skilfully executed example of its type, and a good example of the work of prominent Brisbane monumental masons W. Batstone & Sons.
