= Caskey Monument =

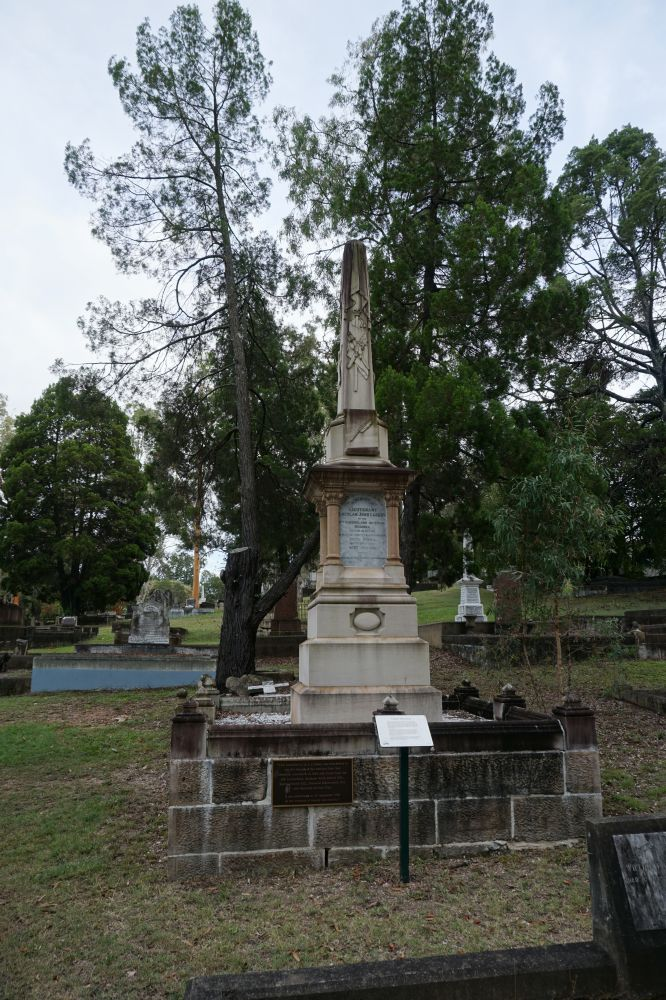

- Location within Queensland Location within Australia
- 27.4744°S 152.9825°E
- Location: Toowong Cemetery, 124 Birdwood Terrace, Toowong, City of Brisbane, Queensland, Australia

History
- Design period: 1900–1914 (early 20th century)
- Built: 1902

Site notes
- Architect: William Busby

Queensland Heritage Register
- Official name: Caskey Monument
- Type: state heritage (built)
- Designated: 21 October 1992
- Reference no.: 600335
- Significant period: 1902 (fabric, historical)
- Significant components: memorial – obelisk
- Builders: William Busby

Caskey Monument is a heritage-listed memorial at the Toowong Cemetery, 124 Birdwood Terrace, Toowong, City of Brisbane, Queensland, Australia. It was designed and built by William Busby in 1902. It was added to the Queensland Heritage Register on 21 October 1992.

== History ==
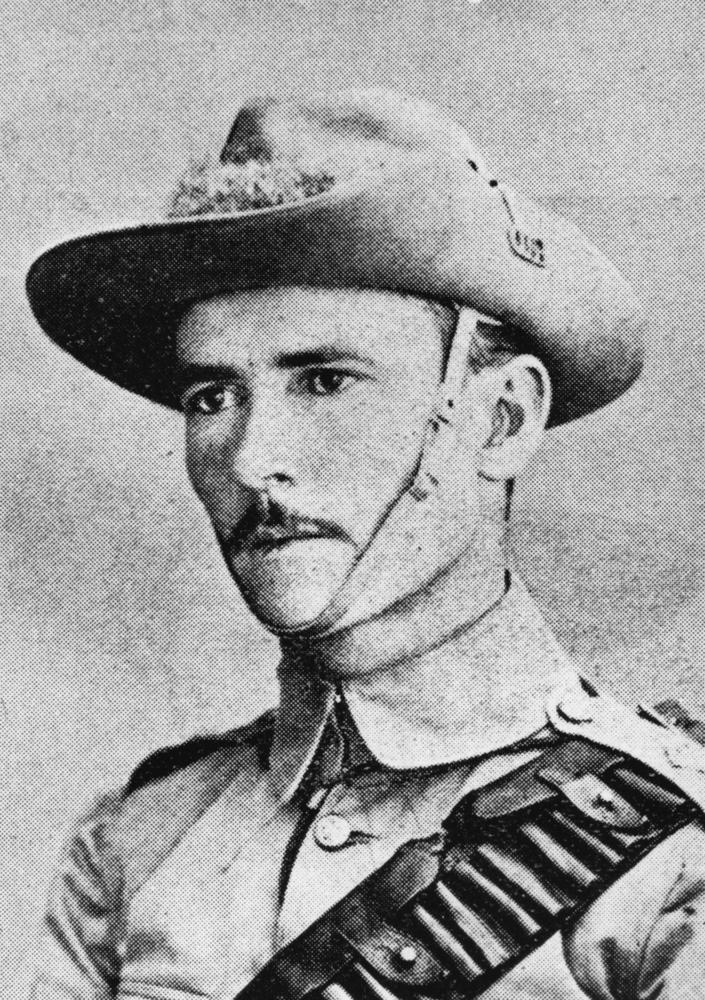
Lieutenant Lachlan J. Caskey of the 5th Queensland Contingent, circa 1901

This monument was erected at Toowong Cemetery in May 1902 in memory of Lieutenant Lachlan John Caskey, who was killed in action at Makari Drift, Caledon River, South Africa on 27 September 1901. He was 31 years old.

Caskey was a member of the 5th Queensland Imperial Bushmen and, like all Australian troops participating in the South African War (Boer War) of 1899–1902, was a volunteer. As a member of the QIB he was under British command, and his pay was issued by the colonial government at an English cavalryman's rate.

The Caskey Monument is the first known South African War monument to be erected in Queensland. A design competition was won by prominent monumental mason William Busby, a public committee was established to raise the £70 construction cost, and the project was sponsored by the Queensland Government. Caskey was a sportsman and school teacher, and his monument was unveiled by John Murray, Minister of Public Instruction.

The Caskey Monument is one of only four known South African War monuments in Brisbane, the others being the Berry and MacFarlane Monument (1902) at Sherwood, the Anning Monument (1903) at Hemmant and the South African War Memorial (1919) in Anzac Square in the Brisbane central business district. The design of the Caskey Monument, particularly the obelisk and draped shroud, appears to have been the model for the others. Another monument to Caskey, erected near Allora where he had taught, has been lost.

== Description ==
The monument, which consists of an obelisk on a pedestal, is executed in Helidon sandstone and stands 5 metres (16 ft) high.

The white sandstone obelisk is draped in a shroud. A sword is carved in relief on the front face. Below it is a quill, a tribute to Caskey's academic achievements. On the west face are crossed tennis racquets and on the east, crossed cricket bats, acknowledging his sporting interests. This theme is continued with a football on the front of the pedestal.

The pedestal also features recessed slabs of Italian marble on all sides, flanked by columns of brown sandstone. The front slab bears a leaded inscription. The monument is surrounded by a sandstone retaining wall.

== Heritage listing ==
Caskey Monument was listed on the Queensland Heritage Register on 21 October 1992 having satisfied the following criteria.

The place is important in demonstrating the evolution or pattern of Queensland's history.

The Caskey Monument at Toowong, (unusually, a Government sponsored memorial to an individual), is important as the first known South African War memorial in Queensland and a model for later monuments in this state.

The place demonstrates rare, uncommon or endangered aspects of Queensland's cultural heritage.

The Caskey Monument at Toowong, (unusually, a Government sponsored memorial to an individual), is important as the first known South African War memorial in Queensland and a model for later monuments in this state. The monument provides a unique source of historical information, and the design is important in illustrating the social fashion and attitudes of its era.

The place is important in demonstrating the principal characteristics of a particular class of cultural places.

The monument provides a unique source of historical information, and the design is important in illustrating the social fashion and attitudes of its era.

The Caskey Monument at Toowong, (unusually, a Government sponsored memorial to an individual), is important as the first known South African War memorial in Queensland and a model for later monuments in this state.

The place is important because of its aesthetic significance.

The monument provides a unique source of historical information, and the design is important in illustrating the social fashion and attitudes of its era.
