= Toowong Cemetery =

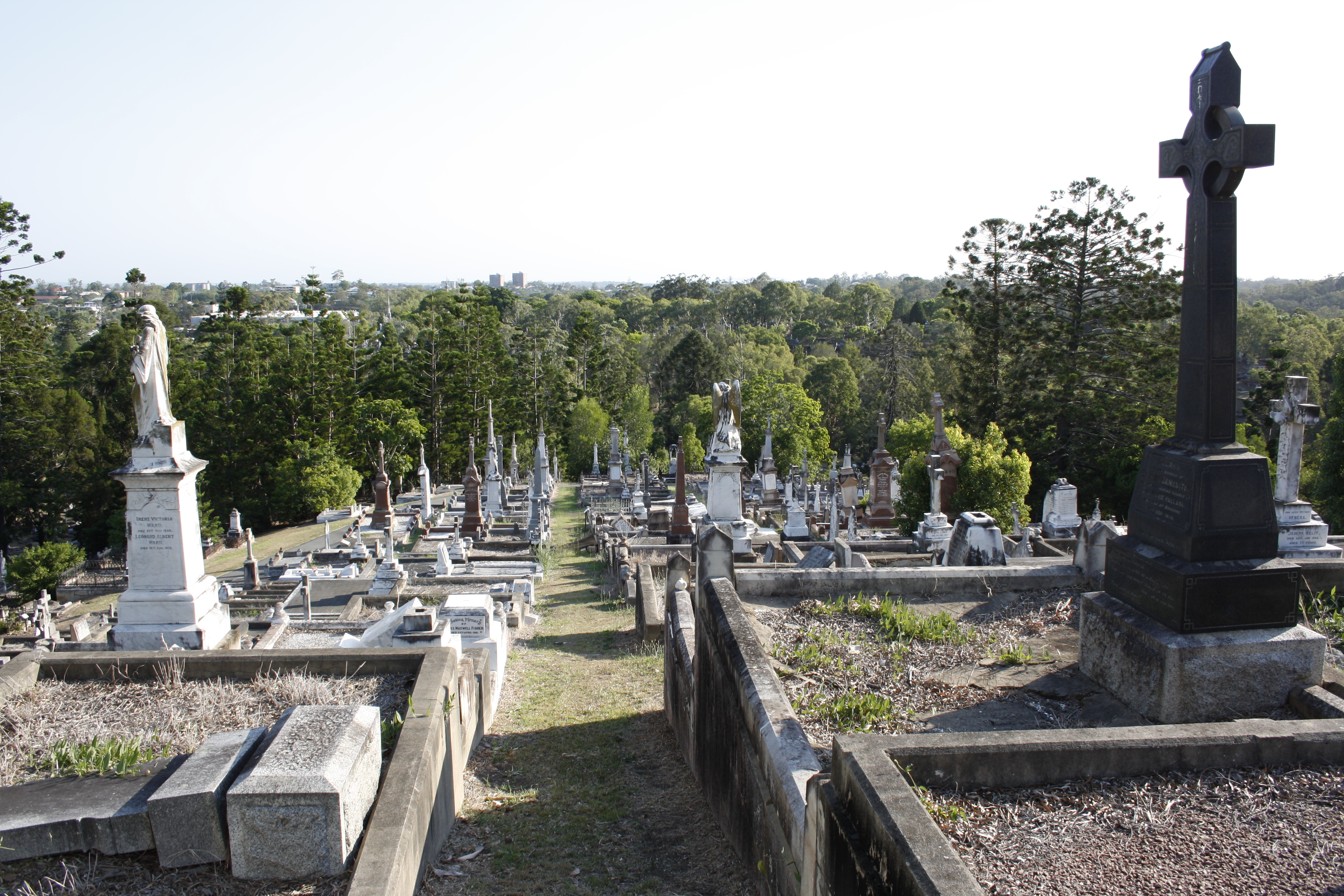
- Toowong Cemetery
- Interactive map of Toowong Cemetery

Details
- Established: 1866
- Location: Toowong, Brisbane
- Country: Australia
- Coordinates: 27°28′27″S 152°58′58″E
- Type: Monumental
- Owned by: Brisbane City Council
- Size: 44 ha (110 acres)
- No. of graves: Over 120,000
- Website: Official website

Toowong Cemetery
- Location within Queensland
- 27.4744°S 152.9819°E
- Location: Corner of Frederick Street and Mt Cootha Road, Toowong, City of Brisbane, Queensland, Australia

History
- Design period: 1870s–1890s (late 19th century)
- Built: 1870–

Queensland Heritage Register
- Official name: Toowong Cemetery, Brisbane General Cemetery
- Type: state heritage (built, landscape)
- Designated: 31 December 2002
- Reference no.: 601773
- Significant period: 1870– (social); 1870–1998 (historical); 1870–1924
- Significant components: gate – entrance, memorial – cairn, sexton's office, cemetery, grave marker, fence/wall – perimeter, memorial – plaque, headstone, trees/plantings, road/roadway, pathway/walkway, shed – shelter, amenities building

Toowong Cemetery is a heritage-listed cemetery on the corner of Frederick Street and Mt Coot-tha Road, Toowong, City of Brisbane, Queensland, Australia. It was established in 1866 and formally opened in 1875. It is Queensland's largest cemetery and is located on forty-four hectares of land at the corner of Frederick Street and Mount Coot-tha Road approximately four and a half kilometres west of Brisbane. It was previously known as Brisbane General Cemetery. It was added to the Queensland Heritage Register on 31 December 2002.

Although still used as a cemetery, it is a popular place for joggers and dog walkers, with its over-hanging fig trees and winding pathways. The Friends of Toowong Cemetery is a volunteer group that discover and share the history and stories of Toowong Cemetery. They conduct tours and provide a series of self-guided walks through the cemetery.

== History ==
Bureaucratic procrastination, manoeuvring and public discontent colour the early history of the Brisbane General Cemetery at Toowong and contributed to the decades of delay in providing a new General Cemetery for Brisbane in the second half of the nineteenth century.

The first cemetery serving the small penal settlement that was Brisbane between 1825 and 1842 was located on the (present day) northern approach to the William Jolly Bridge, bounded by Skew Street, Saul Street, Eagle Terrace and Upper Roma Street. It was here that soldiers and convicts were interred but was considered unfit for the burial of children. One soldier's four children were buried in a brick crypt in an area at North Quay near Herschel Street.

As Brisbane expanded due to its opening to free settlement in 1842, growth was such that the cemetery was eventually surrounded by residential properties. The concept of a rural cemetery located outside the bounds of town limits emerged as a major transformation in burial practices in the late 18th century in Britain and Europe and was well established by the time towns and settlements were being formed in Queensland. A new burial ground was surveyed for North Brisbane in 1844 just beyond the (then) western boundary of the municipality, reserving twenty five hectares of land between Milton Road, Hale Street, Sweetman Street and Dowse Street (the southern part of which is now Suncorp Stadium); it was known as North Brisbane Burial Ground officially but also as Milton Cemetery and Paddington Cemetery, reflecting its location. However, the public did not feel the cemetery was sufficiently distant from the residential areas. Whilst the proximity of the new cemetery allowed customary procession on foot, and natural drainage away from the early settlement served to allay sanitary concerns, as early as 1851, the public were petitioning the Government of New South Wales (the separation of Queensland did not occur until 1859) to relocate the North Brisbane Burial Grounds. Brisbane's rapid expansion following its opening to free settlement in 1842 was such that the Paddington Cemetery, was now in the heart of a prime inner residential area and was being challenged by the residents who feared for their health.

The first progress to establish a new cemetery were made in 1861 when 200 acres (0.81 km^{2}) of land was set aside for cemetery purposes at Toowong, 2 miles (3.2 km) south-west of the North Brisbane Burial Ground. The land however, was chosen by default rather than by design. Augustus Gregory, the Surveyor-General had not favoured the Toowong site but found it to be the only locality to present the requisite requirements. The appropriateness of the site at Toowong for the purpose of a General Cemetery was an issue contested for the next two decades. The isolation and suitability of the Toowong site with its lack of access and public transport fuelled dissent and debate and the public continued to use the cheaper, more accessible familial grounds at Paddington.

Although the Cemetery Act was passed in 1866 providing the means to establish general cemeteries under the control of government appointed trustees, it was another decade before the Toowong Cemetery was officially opened. In 1868, a further portion of Crown land, 53 acres in area, north of the cemetery reserve was added to fulfil of the Trustee's requirement for the entire cemetery to be surrounded with public roads.

The reserve of 250 acres 1 rood was gazetted and the Cemetery Trust established in October 1870 and its honorary trustees were amongst Brisbane's most prominent political and business figures – James Cowlishaw, John Hardgrave, William Pettigrew, Samuel Walker Griffith, George Edmonstone, Alexander Raff, John Petrie (Chairman), Michael Quinlan and Nathaniel Lade.

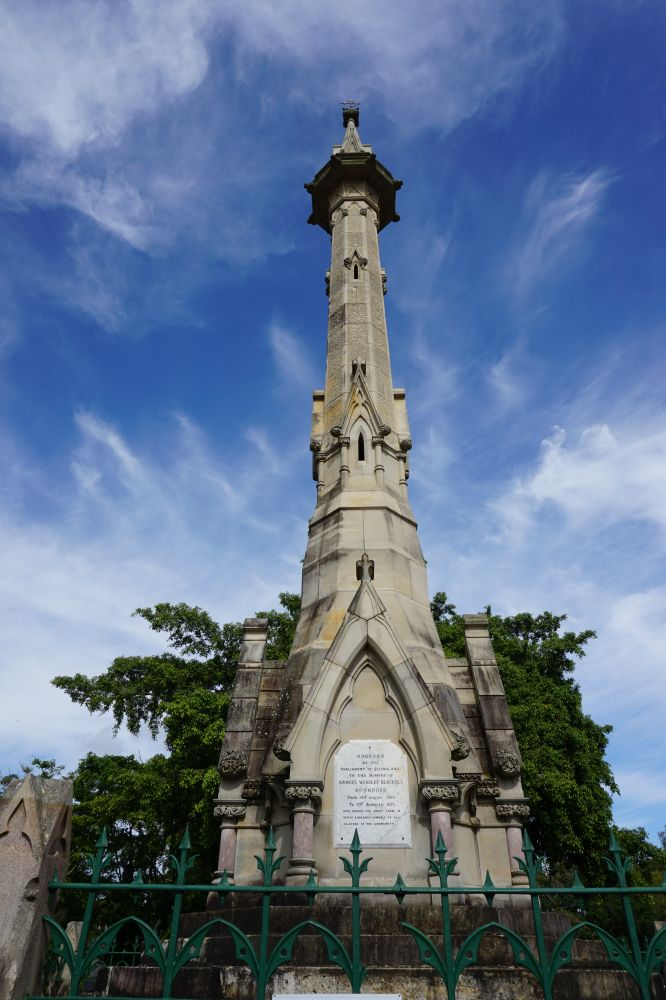
Governor Blackall's memorial, 2015

Trial sinkings at Toowong in December 1870 found the ground to be unsuitable, but this knowledge did not prompt the government to secure a more appropriate location. Queensland's second governor, Samuel Wensley Blackall had been a supporter of the Toowong site and in his ill health indicated his desire to be buried there. He was buried on the highest knoll on 3 January 1871 and his memorial is the largest and most prominent in the cemetery with commanding views of the city and surrounds.

The Surveyor General, the Trustees and the Colonial Secretary had not favoured the Toowong Site and even after the burial of Governor Blackall on its most prominent peak, the Trustees were still pursuing other more suitable prospects for a cemetery site. Three private properties had been offered for sale for cemetery purposes. Of these, Trustee George Edmondstone's property on Enoggera Creek was identified as being most suitable; however the Colonial Treasurer could not reach an agreement on price and the Toowong site came to be accepted as the Brisbane General Cemetery grounds.

In June 1871, Petrie, Pettigrew and Perry were nominated to choose a suitable 40 acres for clearing for the general cemetery. In 1872, ground lying north of the road and east of the western boundary of the 53 acre portion was cleared and enclosed by 540 rods of good quality pig fencing (a four rail fence) with two entrances not more than 4 rods on each side of the main entrance erected by John Ballard.

A Keeper's Lodge was built by E Lewis and gates and ornamental fencing at the main entrance, designed by the Colonial Architect, FDG Stanley, were erected in 1873–74.

Between Governor Blackall's burial and the official opening of the Cemetery, there were six burials. The next interment was Ann Hill, daughter of Walter Hill, superintendent of the Botanical Gardens on 2 November 1871. Thomas and Martha McCulloch were buried in November 1873, Teresa Maria Love on 16 March 1875 and Florence and Ethel Gordon on 4 July 1875.

The Trustees received numerous requests for separate burial sections from churches and other like-minded group to ensure that religious and social class distinctions within society were perpetuated in mortality. Between November 1874 and August 1875 portions were allocated by the Trustees upon request. Portion No 1, was allocated to the Church of England, Portion No 2 to the Wesleyans, Portion No 3 to the Hebrews, Portion No 7 to the Roman Catholics, Portion No 16 to paupers and No 17 and parts of No 1 and 7 to public graves, Portion No 15 to criminals. In 1879, the Chinese were allocated part of Portion 2, then relocated in January 1884 to the ground below 7 and then again in April of that year to Portion No 8. The various cultural and religious groups were separated and boundaries clearly formed by winding roads. There is a strong showing of the Christian section of the graves, supporting the demographic dominance of Anglo-Saxons in Brisbane and the relocation of the Chinese several times (now in Portion 19) demonstrates the disregard afforded to this section of the community, which exhumed many of its dead for reinterment in China.

The lack of public transportation for funeral processions was one of the perceived shortfalls of the Toowong site, so the extension of the Main Line railway through the western suburbs to Toowong in 1875 with the promise of a mortuary rail station (similar to Sydney's Mortuary railway station) provided the catalyst for the opening of the cemetery. The grounds at the Cemetery were laid out by the prominent surveyor, George Phillips and a set of books drawn up by the Government Printer. The Cemetery was officially opened on 5 July 1875.

Controversy was quelled for a time but the respite was short lived and the Cemetery was subjected to a parliamentary inquiry in 1877 where public health issues, the steep and rocky terrain, the distance and inconvenience for mourners and the cost in relation to other alternatives including mortuary trains to Toowong were considered. No further meetings were held by the Trustees until March 1878.

The Cemetery had come to be valued for not only its heritage as the resting place of Governor Blackall but as a place for recreation and repose. Had the government decided from its inquiry to abandon the Toowong Cemetery in favour of another proposed site at Woogaroo, the Trustees wanted to retain the management of the Toowong site and for it to be maintained in an ornamental way as a place of resort for the people of Brisbane.

Community health concerns relating to the Cemetery began to dissipate in the second half of the 1880s. Whilst a public meeting of concerned residents discussed the closure of the cemetery in July 1885, within six months the local community was petitioning the Trustees to endorse the opening of a road through the cemetery reserve. Approval for the public thoroughfare through the cemetery was given in July 1886. The approval renewed concern in some quarters for the health risks associated with the increase in public activity at the Cemetery and the planting of trees amongst the graves especially of those dying of virulent diseases was advocated.

The cemetery was however, well established with trees by this time. From 1876, one year after its official opening, many plants and young trees had been supplied to the Cemetery from the Botanical Gardens and Acclimatisation Society. Initially, Walter Hill, the Botanical Gardens superintendent donated 38 shade and ornamental trees to the Cemetery and Mr Lewis Adolphus Bernays of the Acclimatisation Society offered 50 trees in exchange for a subscription from the Trustees.

From 1878, the Cemetery gardens were attended by dresser, William Melville, a position he held for 38 years. Flowers, shrubs and plants were cultivated on the site on Portion 10 and sold to meet the needs of the site's visitors from a flower shed that straddled the creek. Mature camellias at the Cemetery, located in Portion 4 and 13 may be the first planted in Queensland from cuttings from Camden Park Estate, the home of John Macarthur, who may have been the first to import them into Australia. A dam on Portion 16 was used for irrigation until 1905 when water taps were installed.

In 1886, the Defence Force leased the largely unused area of the cemetery, now occupied by Anzac Park, as a rifle range and the whole paddock and the Cemetery Overseer's cottage designed by Trustee, James Cowlishaw and built by E Bishop in 1877 came under the control of the Brigade Officer in charge of the Range. In exchange, the Queensland Government built another cottage in 1887 for the overseer at a cost of £250. A pavilion, also designed by Cowlishaw was built in 1885 at the northern end of Portion 10.

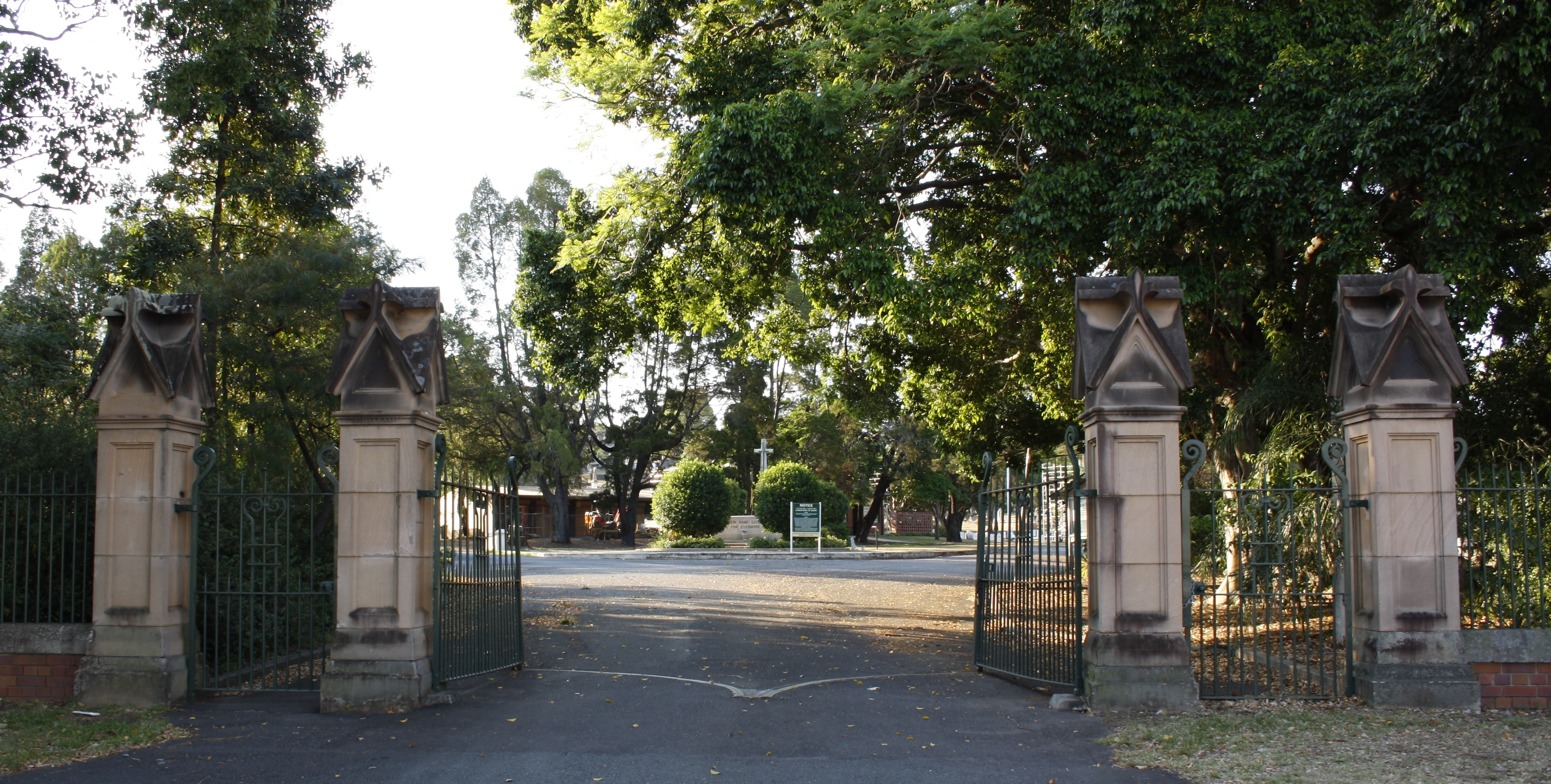
Main entrance gates, 2009

In 1891, extensive public usage of the cemetery land spurred the newly formed Toowong Shire Council to seek an arrangement with the Trustees to utilise some of the land for the purpose of public recreation. Whilst initially reluctant, the Trustees came to support the idea. In 1915, the Toowong Park Act was passed providing the Trustees with the means to transfer 132 acres 2 roods 18 perches to the Toowong Town Council for Park and Recreation purposes known in part as the Old Rifle Range for the sum of £1,000. This revenue was used to finance the construction of new gates and fencing and the purchase in 1916, of Portion 872, the sole adjoining private property, to satisfy the Trustees preference for completely surrounding the cemetery with public roads.

Agitation for public transport within close proximity of the cemetery was finally achieved with the extension of the tramway to the cemetery in 1901. A shelter shed was erected by the Brisbane Tramways Company in 1916.

The Paddington Cemeteries Act of 1911, authorised the Queensland Government to resume the several cemeteries at Milton and, upon the request of any relative of any person buried therein within 12 months, to disinter the remains of the deceased. The remains were removed together with any memorials to any cemetery agreed upon with associated costs borne by the Government. Of the 4,643 identifiable graves at Milton, there were 178 applications made. 139 remains and 105 memorials were relocated from Milton to Toowong throughout the site, with the greatest concentration to be found in Portion 6.

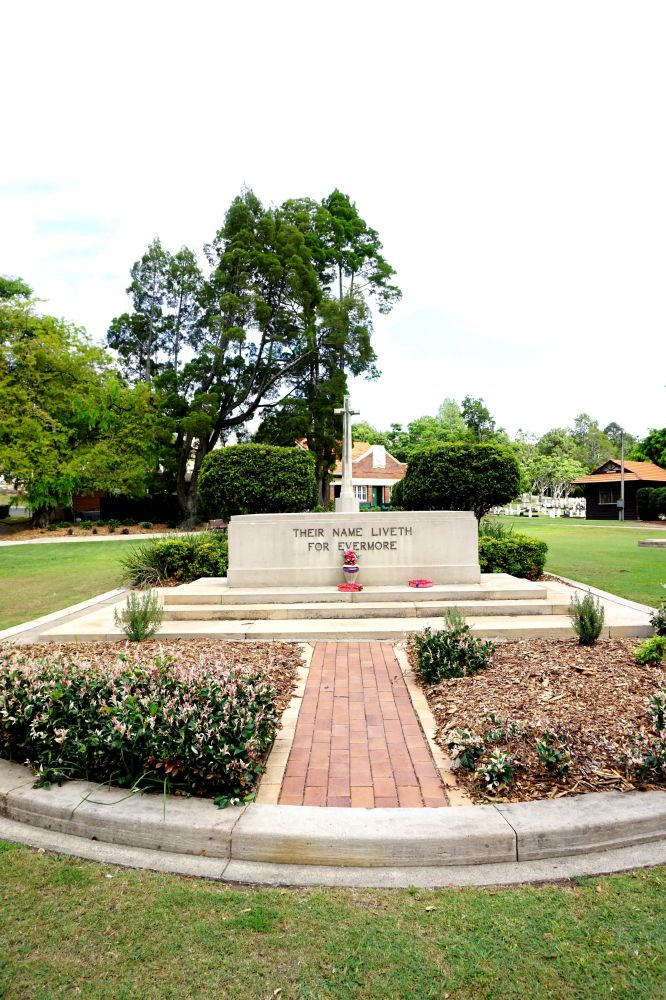
Stone of Remembrance with Cross of Sacrifice behind, 2015

From 1920 until 1930, Canon David Garland (often considered the "architect of the Anzac Day") conducted Brisbane's main Anzac Day ceremonies in Toowong Cemetery. In 1924, through his fund-raising efforts, a Stone of Remembrance and Cross of Sacrifice were placed in the cemetery. On Remembrance Day 1930, ANZAC Square in the Brisbane CBD was officially opened and the Anzac Day services at Toowong Cemetery were transferred to ANZAC Square. Garland died on 9 October 1939 and was buried on 10 October 1939 in Toowong Cemetery.

Tenders for a sanitary block were called by Trustee and architect, Edward Myer Myers in November 1923. The successful tenderer was Marberete Co and the construction was completed prior to Anzac Day 1924 when the Stone of Remembrance and Cross of Sacrifice were unveiled. A report of the ceremony in the Sydney Mail incorrectly refers to the building as a mortuary chapel and flags of the Union Jack were hung over the entries to the men's and ladies' toilets to disguise the signage.

On 1 August 1930, Toowong Cemetery and all others with the Brisbane City Council municipality were placed under the management and control of the council. The following year, the area of the Toowong Cemetery bounded by Mt Coot-tha Road and Miskin and Dean Streets was used by the Australian Military Forces for training and later was transferred to the Brisbane City Council and was developed as a Bus Depot. A substation was erected in the south-east corner of this site in 1935.

Flowers were cultivated and sold at the Cemetery from Portion 10 until the 1930s. In 1934 the area set apart for soldier's graves within Portion 10 was extended and incorporated the flower gardens and the octagonal pavilion was probably demolished at this time. Other shelter sheds were erected and six, including two with toilets, are dotted over the site. In 1936 the last available block, Portion 30, was laid out for burial purposes. To allow for more burials, the plot sizes were reduced from 9 by 5 feet (2.7 m × 1.5 m) to 8 by 4 feet (2.4 m × 1.2 m).

By April 1975, all burial plots in the Cemetery had been sold and the Cemetery was closed with the exception of burials in family graves. That same year, hundreds of worn, forgotten headstones in three major city cemeteries were removed by Brisbane City Council workmen employed under the Regional Employment Development Scheme. Old neglected monuments were removed from Toowong, Lutwyche and South Brisbane cemeteries and trees and shrubs planted. The long-term aim of the scheme was to return the cemeteries to open space with a parkland atmosphere. It is thought approximately 1,000 memorials were removed from Toowong.

In the early 1980s, footpath clearances were substantially reduced along the Frederick Street and Mt Coot-tha Road boundaries and the tram shelter and tram lines were removed as part of the Route 20 overpass and roundabout development. As a result of this work, direct access through the main gates of the Cemetery from all directions but the west has been disconnected.

The Sexton's office, built around the turn of the century on Portion 10 above the floor of the flower shed, fell into disuse once the new Sexton's office was built in 1989. Restoration work to repair and reconstruct the former Sexton's office and its conversion to a museum was initiated by the Brisbane City Council Heritage Advisory Committee and the work carried out by the Heritage Unit in 1991. Another initiative by the Brisbane City Council Heritage Unit, also undertaken in 1991, was the establishment of the Toowong Cemetery Heritage Trail together with the Adopt-a-Pioneer program for plots in need of maintenance and to raise public awareness of the invaluable resource that the cemetery provides.

In 1992, steel boom gates were erected at the Richter Street and Frederick Street entrances of the Cemetery to deter vandalism, theft and drag racing. The same year, a group of volunteers formed The Friends of Toowong Cemetery and their activities include tending to neglected gravesites and organising tours of the Cemetery for interested parties. They have also produced several booklets including the Colonel Samuel Wensley Blackall: 1809–1871 and Extraordinary Lives of Ordinary People.

The Cemetery was reopened in 1998 with approximately 450 plots available for sale.

In 2010, plans to connect the Western Freeway to the Inner City Bypass through a tunnel (now known as Legacy Way) passing under the Toowong Cemetery raised concerns about vibrations from the tunnel boring causing damage to the memorials in the cemetery, some of which were only several metres above the proposed tunnel. In 2012 conservation work was undertaken on 44 memorials believed to be at risk from the tunnel boring vibration, including laying new foundations, bracing the inside of graves, and cementing headstones and cornerstones in place.

In 2011, to mark the 140th anniversary of the cemetery, a re-enactment of Samuel Wensley Blackall burial was held

In 2013, the Canon Garland Memorial Society was established at the Holy Trinity Anglican Church at Woolloongabba, Brisbane. The society aims to honour David Garland's role during the Australian centenary commemorations of World War I. Through their efforts, in November 2015, the Brisbane City Council officially opened a lawn garden called Canon Garland Place at Toowong Cemetery with a commemorative information board. Canon Garland Place is located where Garland held his Anzac Day services in the cemetery and behind The Cross of Sacrifice and Stone of Remembrance that were funded through Garland's fundraising activities.

== Description ==
Plan of the cemetery, 1909

The Brisbane General Cemetery at Toowong is located approximately 4½ kilometres west of the city on 43.73 hectares (108 acres 1.6 perches) bounded on all sides by public roads. The undulating and rugged terrain of the Cemetery falls steeply away from its northern boundary, Birdwood Terrace, which traces the ridge from the north-east corner of the site to Richer Street which forms the western boundary of the Cemetery proper. Mt Coot-tha Road forms the southern boundary and Frederick Street, provides the north–south line of the eastern boundary.

The shoulder to Mt Coot-tha Road, west of Richer Street, comprises an area of 1.116 hectares of Cemetery land that is utilised as supplementary car parking for the Mount Coot-tha Botanic Gardens. The Brisbane City Council Bus Depot, Anzac Park, the Botanical Gardens and the northern end of the western freeway now occupy land that was originally part of the 250-acre 1 rood Cemetery Reserve.

The main entrance to the Toowong Cemetery is at the south-east corner of the site on the corner of Milton Road and Frederick Street through a semi-circular gateway comprising stone gate posts and a cast iron fence on a brick masonry base with stone coping constructed c. 1915. The gate posts are a simplified version of those to the design by Colonial Architect, FDG Stanley erected in 1873–74. The fence extends past Valentine Street on the Frederick Street boundary but is not continuous – a length of fence has been removed. To the west the fence extends more than a hundred metres and includes a narrow gate opening. The remainder of the site is unfenced but the hilly terrain to the northern, western and southern boundaries and the line of eucalypt trees along the Frederick Street prevent vehicles entering the site apart from two other entrances on Richter Street and Frederick Street, which are fitted with modern boom gates. The cemetery is open from 6am to 6pm (the main entrance gates and boomgates are locked outside these hours). However, pedestrian access is still possible at other points on the boundaries.

The modern development of two roundabouts and an overpass built in connection with the Western Freeway have made it difficult to enter the cemetery through its main entrance gates on the corner of Milton Road and Frederick Street, except for a slip road approach from the west. It also affects views of the cemetery through the gates.

The large site is elevated and has views to the Brisbane CBD and surrounding suburbs. It is divided by a series of bitumen-lined serpentine roads between which portions of land for burial purposes have been overlaid with regularly shaped sections at varying orientations. A creek runs diagonally through the site from the north-west to the south east between two ridges. Through Portion 10, the creek is formed by an open concrete lined drain passing under the road to Portion 6 from where it exits the site under Mt Coot-tha Road.

Throughout the cemetery, the topography provides the social division of the cemetery with private graves occupying the highest ground in each portion, public graves along the lower sections and paupers and criminals occupying the low-lying, water logged ground along the creek. The contrast is stark between elaborate monuments built by the elite on the highest ground in an attempt to cheat death through immortality, when compared to the unmarked graves of anonymous paupers on low lying water logged ground. With two exceptions, the Presbyterians in Portion 24 and the Primitive Methodists mostly in Portion 6, the creek serves to separate the general ground to the south from the ground occupied by religious denominations to the north.

Portion 1 contains the Church of England graves with still born babies occupying the northern area of this Portion. Portion 2 which was originally allocated to the Wesleyan Methodists (2A) also contains the graves of more than 10,000 still born babies and other hospital burials. Portion 3 contains the Jewish Section, Portion 4 appears to be a general area and contains the Temple of Peace and the Caskey Memorial. Portion 5 contains public ground. Portion 6 contains Primitive Methodists and also a substantial number of the reinterments from the old Milton/Paddington Cemetery. Portion 7 contains Irish Catholics and 7A, the Roman Catholics. The small subdivision of 7A to the west of Portion 7 contains the early Roman Catholic graves. Portion 8 once contained Chinese graves (relocated to portion 2 and then portion 7 before being re-interred to portion 19). Most of the early Chinese graves were exhumed and removed to China. Portion 8 and 18 contain general ground with Greek and Russian Orthodox at the western ends of both.

Portions 9, 11, 12, 13 and 14 surround the Blackall Monument located on the highest knoll in the Cemetery. The upper reaches of these portions contain Queensland's most prominent political, legal, arts, religious and business figures. Portions 15 and 15 A contain public Catholic graves. Part of 15 was originally allocated to the burial of criminals and was later resold as Catholic ground. The pauper grounds were located in the low-lying area in Portion 16. The top dressing in this area has been stripped and the area is presently used for the dumping of tree trimmings and other rubbish.

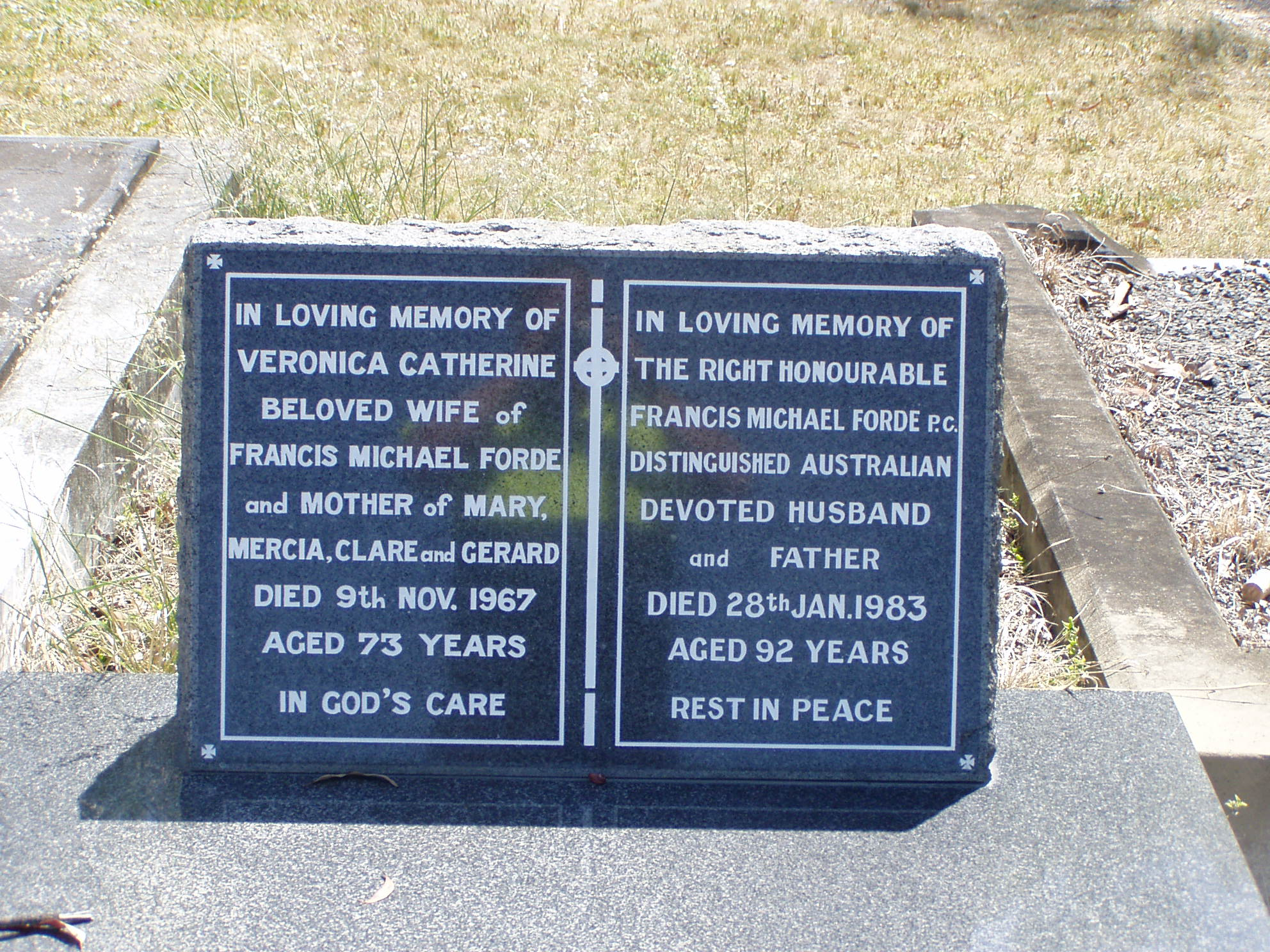
Headstone for Frank Forde

Portion 10 contains the administrative buildings for the site – the Sexton's office, the Museum (former Sexton's office) and storage shed spanning the open drain, the Amenities block with a storage and workshop adjacent. The Stone of Remembrance and Cross of Sacrifice occupy the southern end of this Portion and are prominently centred on an axis from the main entry gates. Portions 20, 21, 22, 23, 29 and 29A in the northern corner of the Cemetery were laid out after the turn of the 20th century. Part of Portions 21 and 22 contain hospital and Department of Native Affairs graves. Portion 22 contains Italian graves and also the grave of former Prime Minister Frank Forde.

Portions 25, 26 and 27 laid out in the western corner of the site contain Catholic graves and occupy the land purchased in 1916 from Ned Alexander (Portion 872). Portion 30 was the last ground to be laid out in 1930 and contains, amongst others, graves for Dunwich and Goodna Asylum patients in its south-eastern corner. An avenue of oleanders marks the boundary between portions 29 and 30.

A survey of the layout of graves, reveal differences between many of the portions with some aligned to magnetic north, some to true north and others at varying degrees from North. The sections in the Church of England section are laid out at 45 degrees east of true north. (In August 1875, the Church of England requested that graves be laid east–west).

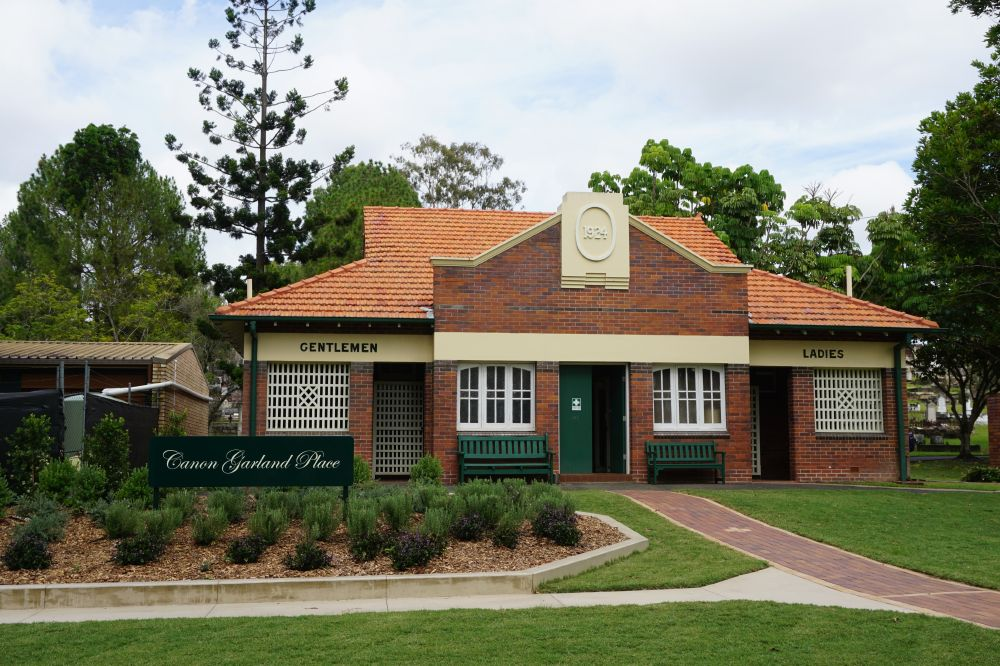
Canon Garland Place in front of the Amenities block, 2015

Framing the entrance to the Cemetery, are an imposing grouping of mature trees including weeping banyan (Ficus benjamina), camphor laurels (Cinnamomum camphora) and Bangalow palm trees (Archontophoenix cunninghamia). Bamboo was originally planted to frame the entrance. A line of mature Cypress pine (Callitris cupressiformis) behind the Cross of Sacrifice and Shrine of Remembrance serve to obscure the view to the Amenities Building. Hedges providing a screen to obscure views of the turn of the century Sexton's office have been removed. Substantial fig trees mark many of the roadway intersections over the site and an irregular arrangement of Cypress pines, bunya pines (Araucaria bidwillii), camphor laurels, jacaranda (Jacaranda mimosifolia) as well as eucalypts and several other plant species over the entire site provide a natural appearance.

There are several small avenues of trees throughout the Cemetery including one of mature camphor laurels between portions 6 and 9 and another of an unidentified species along the approach to the Blackall Monument which provides an intimate canopy that belies and enhances the impact of the memorial and its end. A large banyan fig tree and a maple tree form the backdrop to the monument at the top of the hill.

There are approximately 117,000 people buried at Toowong and the variation of headstones and memorials is vast. The imposing Blackall Memorial forms the most dominant feature in the southern part of the cemetery, and long views of memorial are afforded for some distance along Western Freeway well before the approach to the cemetery is reached. Less prominent, but equally impressive is the craftsmanship attached to many of the individual graves. Sculpture, tiling, edging, cast ironwork, plantings and the like all contribute to the character of the site as a whole.

With the exception of the shelter sheds in various locations within the grounds, the structures associated with the administration and maintenance of the Cemetery grounds are confined to Portion 10. The Museum building, located over the open drain, was formerly the Sexton's office and was built at the turn of the century. It is a single-storey single-skin timber-framed building with terracotta tile roof. The two room structure is located above the floor of an earlier structure identified as the flower shed which was associated with the cultivation and selling of flowers from Portion 10. The internal partition wall was reconstructed, windows replaced and an adjoining store room was demolished as part of the museum conversion project carried out by the Brisbane City Council Heritage Unit in 1991. Adjacent to the former Sexton's office, also straddling the open drain is a storage shed of substantial construction. It has a concrete floor, in situ concrete walls with large, roughly sawn hardwood roof framing and lining.

The 1924 Sanitary Block or Amenities Building is a substantially intact, single storey masonry building with terracotta tile roof. The building has a symmetrical layout and is accessible from the east or west. The four corners of the building contain rest areas with battened openings and bench seating and provide access to the lavatories and retiring rooms, the men's on the south of the building and the women's on the north. Entry to the central dining room is via an ancillary space on the east containing showers (a later addition or modification?) and on the west containing a kitchen. The masonry internal walls are glazed face bricks in the ancillary spaces with painted brickwork the main central space. Tiles line the masonry walls to the lavatories, retiring rooms and associated corridors.

Other buildings on Portion 10 include the new Sexton's office, a single storey cavity brick building with terracotta tile roof erected in 1989 and a single storey masonry storage and work shed with metal roof of recent construction. This shed is located adjacent to the southern end of the amenities building.

== Heritage listing ==
Toowong Cemetery was listed on the Queensland Heritage Register on 31 December 2002 having satisfied the following criteria.

The place is important in demonstrating the evolution or pattern of Queensland's history.

The Brisbane General Cemetery at Toowong, established in 1866 and formally opened in 1875, is Queensland's largest cemetery. It is important in demonstrating the evolution of Queensland history, as it provides evidence, through the division of its portions and the headstones and memorials they contain, of the history and the demography of Brisbane and the diversity of its cultural, religious and ethnic groups and districts. The layout of burial sites at the Cemetery is indicative of 19th century social and religious stratification and the progressive layering, development and diversity of styles of memorialisation contained within the Cemetery document changing attitudes to death and fashions in funerary ornamentation since the 1870s.

The place demonstrates rare, uncommon or endangered aspects of Queensland's cultural heritage.

The Toowong Cemetery is a rare example of the Victorian concept of a mortuary park and the collection of memorials and gravestones record unique documentary information that is of interest to art, military, local history, architectural and sculptural historians, students of typography and demography, genealogists and relatives of the deceased.

The place has potential to yield information that will contribute to an understanding of Queensland's history.

Within its layout and location of structures including the former Sexton's office and storage shed constructed over the drain, the Toowong Cemetery has the potential to reveal further information about 19th and 20th century burial practices generally and specific cemetery systems.

The place is important in demonstrating the principal characteristics of a particular class of cultural places.

At the base of Mt Coot-tha, with the Botanical Gardens and Anzac Park opposite, and with the Brisbane Forest Park as its backdrop, the Toowong Cemetery's picturesque setting maintains the visual allusion of the Victorian concept of a mortuary park on the outskirts of the city. Its elevated location to minimise health risks and its inclusion of all denominations typify the characteristics of late nineteenth century cemeteries.

The place is important because of its aesthetic significance.

Together with its man-made aesthetic attributes, such as fences, gates, pavilions, memorials and landscaping, an atmosphere conducive to repose and reflection that was an essential part of the ritual of honouring and remembering the dead was created and continues to be valued by the community.

The place is important in demonstrating a high degree of creative or technical achievement at a particular period.

Many of the monuments display a high level of creative endeavour and are important for their design and craftsmanship, material qualities and physical impact. The Temple of Peace, Trooper Cobb's Grave and the Caskey Memorial have been previously listed individually for their significance on the Queensland and National heritage registers. The memorial to Governor Blackall is an imposing, tall, slender column of stone and has value as a landmark, marking the southern section of the cemetery and the approach to Toowong along the western freeway. As a group, the memorials, both modest and grand, are enhanced by their collective location, range of types and variations in design.

The place has a strong or special association with a particular community or cultural group for social, cultural or spiritual reasons.

As Brisbane's foremost public cemetery, the Toowong Cemetery was the focus of public ritual and sentiment and its association with the Brisbane and wider community continues. It is the burial place of individuals from all walks of life. The place has a special association with persons of importance in local, regional and Queensland history. Some noteworthy individuals buried at Toowong include but are not limited to a Prime Minister, two Queensland Governors, 13 Queensland Premiers, 11 Queensland Labor leaders, at least 15 Brisbane Mayors and many other prominent political, religious, sports, arts and business figures.

The place has a special association with the life or work of a particular person, group or organisation of importance in Queensland's history.

The place has a strong association with Governor Samuel Wensley Blackall and the prominence of the site selected for his huge monument indicates the prestige allotted to him and remains as a legacy of his influence and popularity. The Cemetery also has a special association with the life and work of its Trustees – those responsible for its development and maintenance, most of whom are interred within the grounds. As a foundation Trustee, architect James Cowlishaw's (1834–1929) association spanned 59 years. John Petrie (1822–1892), builder, monumental mason and Brisbane's first Lord Mayor was also a foundation Trustee and his monumental masonry business located opposite the main entry to the cemetery for 100 years produced a large proportion of the memorials and headstones in the cemetery. Architect Edward Myer Myers (1864–1926) was a Trustee from 1920 until his death and was responsible for the design of the Amenities Building. The monuments and gravestones provide evidence of the practice of monumental masonry and art metalwork in Queensland and of the work of notable architects, sculptors, artists and other craftsmen.

=== Other heritage listings ===
In addition to being heritage-listed itself, the cemetery contains a number of heritage-listed monuments:

- Caskey Monument listed on the Queensland Heritage Register in 1992
- Temple of Peace listed on the Queensland Heritage Register in 1992
- Trooper Cobb's Grave listed on the Queensland Heritage Register in 1992

== Notable people interred ==
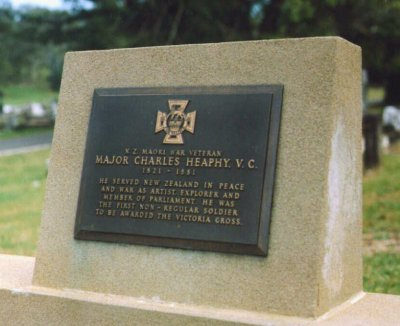
Charles Heaphy's headstone in Portion 1 of Toowong Cemetery.

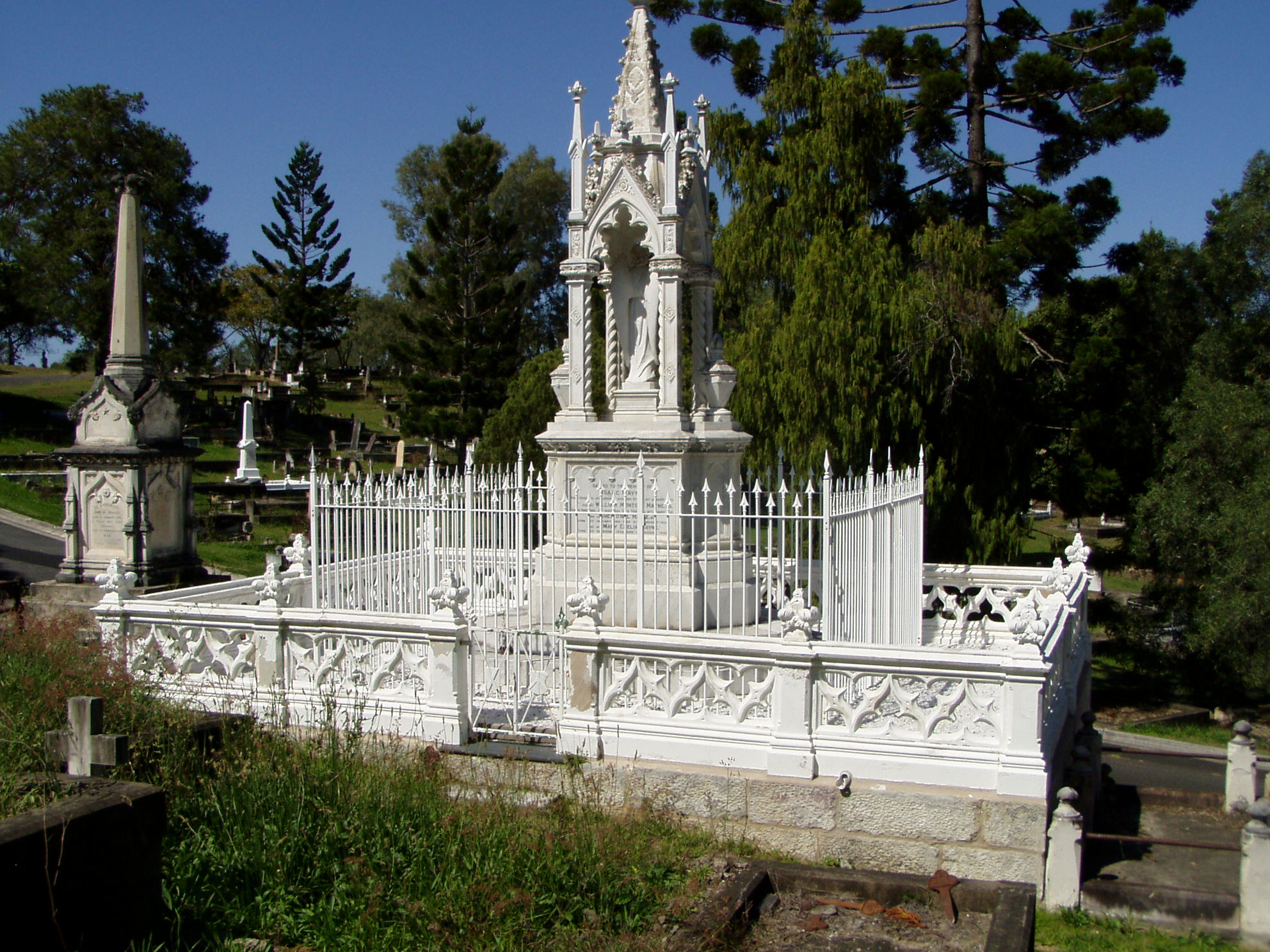
Tomb of the Mayne Family which is to this day maintained by the University of Queensland.

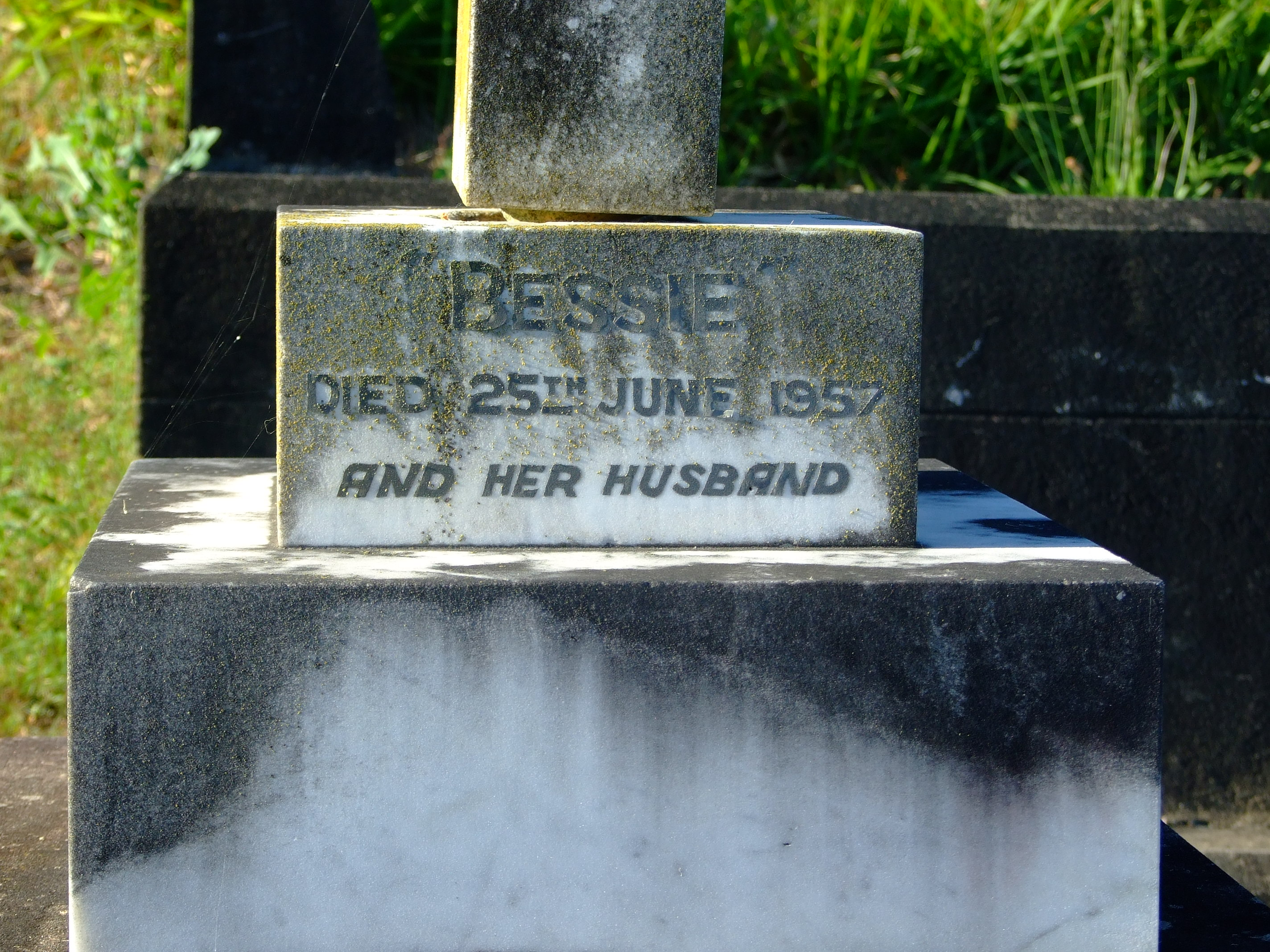
Headstone of Walter Thomas Porriott, a possible Jack the Ripper suspect.

A list of people buried in Toowong Cemetery can be found in Category:Burials at Toowong Cemetery and in the list below:

- Samuel Wensley Blackall, Queensland's second governor
- David Bowman, politician and Opposition Leader of Queensland
- Thomas Joseph Byrnes, politician and Premier of Queensland
- John Cameron, Brisbane politician, realtor, and author
- Dr Lilian Cooper, Queensland's first female doctor and the second female doctor in Australia
- Pope Alexander Cooper, Chief Justice and Attorney-General
- Arthur Corbett, senior Australian public servant
- Leslie Corrie, mayor of Brisbane
- James Davis, Escaped Scottish prisoner who lived among the natives for over 14 years
- Anderson Dawson, politician and Premier of Queensland
- Lefevre James Cranstone, British artist
- Frank Forde, politician and Prime Minister of Australia
- Thomas Finney, social reformer, politician and businessman
- William Gillies, politician and Premier of Queensland
- Sir Augustus Charles Gregory, Australian explorer
- Samuel Griffith, politician, Premier of Queensland, Chief Justice, and a principal author of the Constitution of Australia
- Ned Hanlon, politician and Premier of Queensland
- Charles Heaphy, explorer and recipient of the Victoria Cross
- Peter Jackson, boxer
- Karl Kast, spree killer
- William Lennon, Lieutenant-Governor of Queensland
- Charles Lilley, politician, Premier of Queensland, and Chief Justice
- Wilton Love (1861–1933), medical doctor, surgeon and x-ray pioneer
- Thomas McCawley, Chief Justice of Queensland
- William McCormack, politician and Premier of Queensland
- Percy McDonnell, Australian Cricket Captain
- John McLaren, Australian cricketer
- Charles Stuart Mein, barrister, politician and judge of the Supreme Court of Queensland.
- Emma Miller, suffragette and trade union organiser
- Boyd Dunlop Morehead, politician and Premier of Queensland
- Arthur Morgan, politician and Premier of Queensland
- John Murray, Member of the Queensland Legislative Assembly and Member of the Queensland Legislative Council
- Sir Anthony Musgrave, Queensland's sixth governor
- Arthur Hunter Palmer, politician and Premier of Queensland
- John Petrie, first mayor of Brisbane
- Robert Philp, politician and Premier of Queensland
- W. V. Ralston, banker
- Alfred John Raymond, mayor of Brisbane
- Steele Rudd, Australian author
- T. J. Ryan, politician and Premier of Queensland
- Jan Hendrik Scheltema, livestock and figure painter
- Sir Robert Townley Scott, first Secretary of the Postmaster-General's Department after Federation
- William Forgan Smith, politician and Premier of Queensland
- Kay Glasson Taylor, novelist
- James Warner, pioneer surveyor
- Edward Sidney Webster, gunner, died in the Battle of Brisbane

=== War Graves ===
The cemetery contains the war graves of 270 Commonwealth service personnel of World War I and 117 from World War II, besides 2 sailors of the Dutch Navy from the latter war. Most of the graves are in the Returned Services Plot in Portion 10.

== Gallery ==
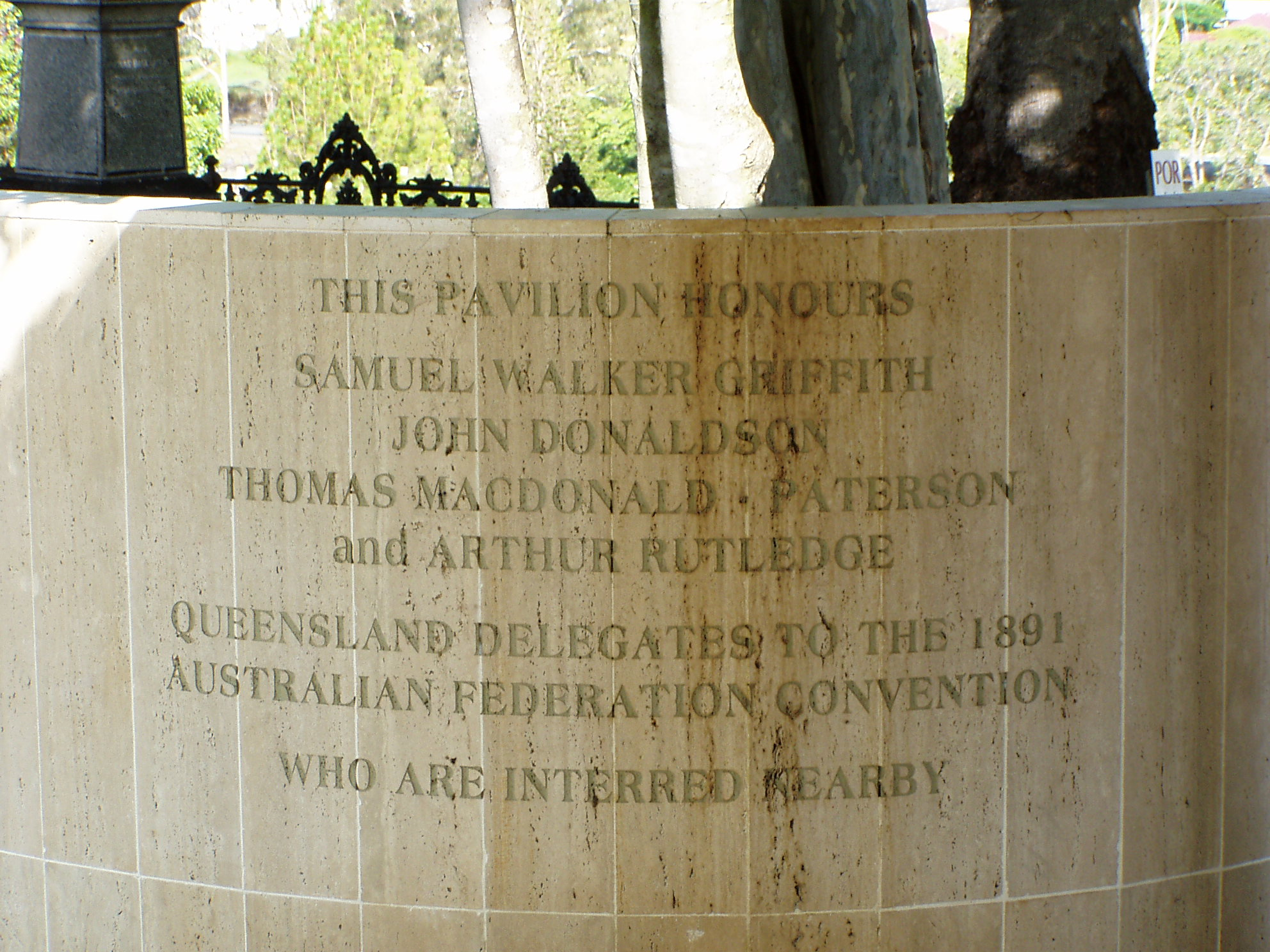

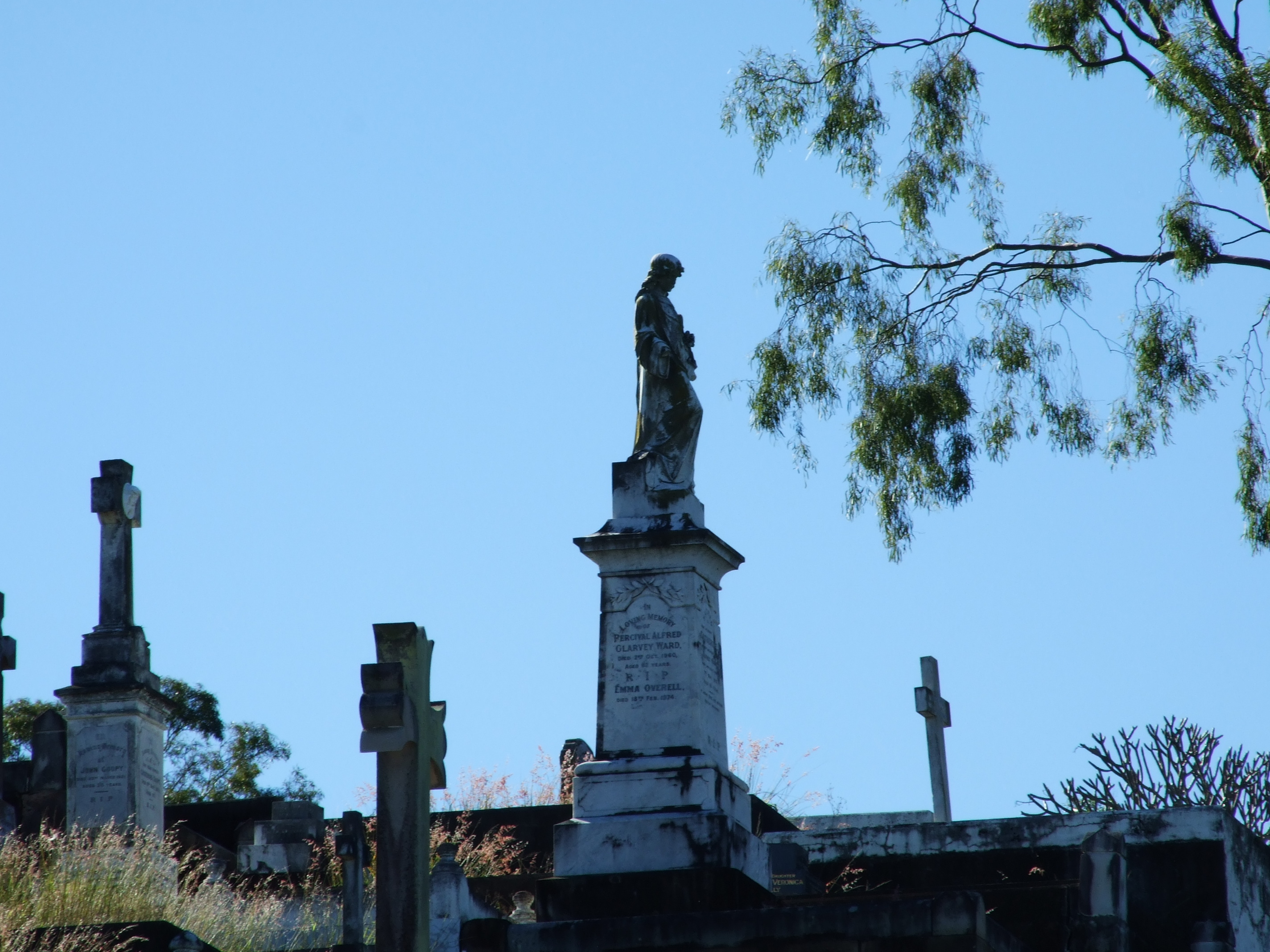

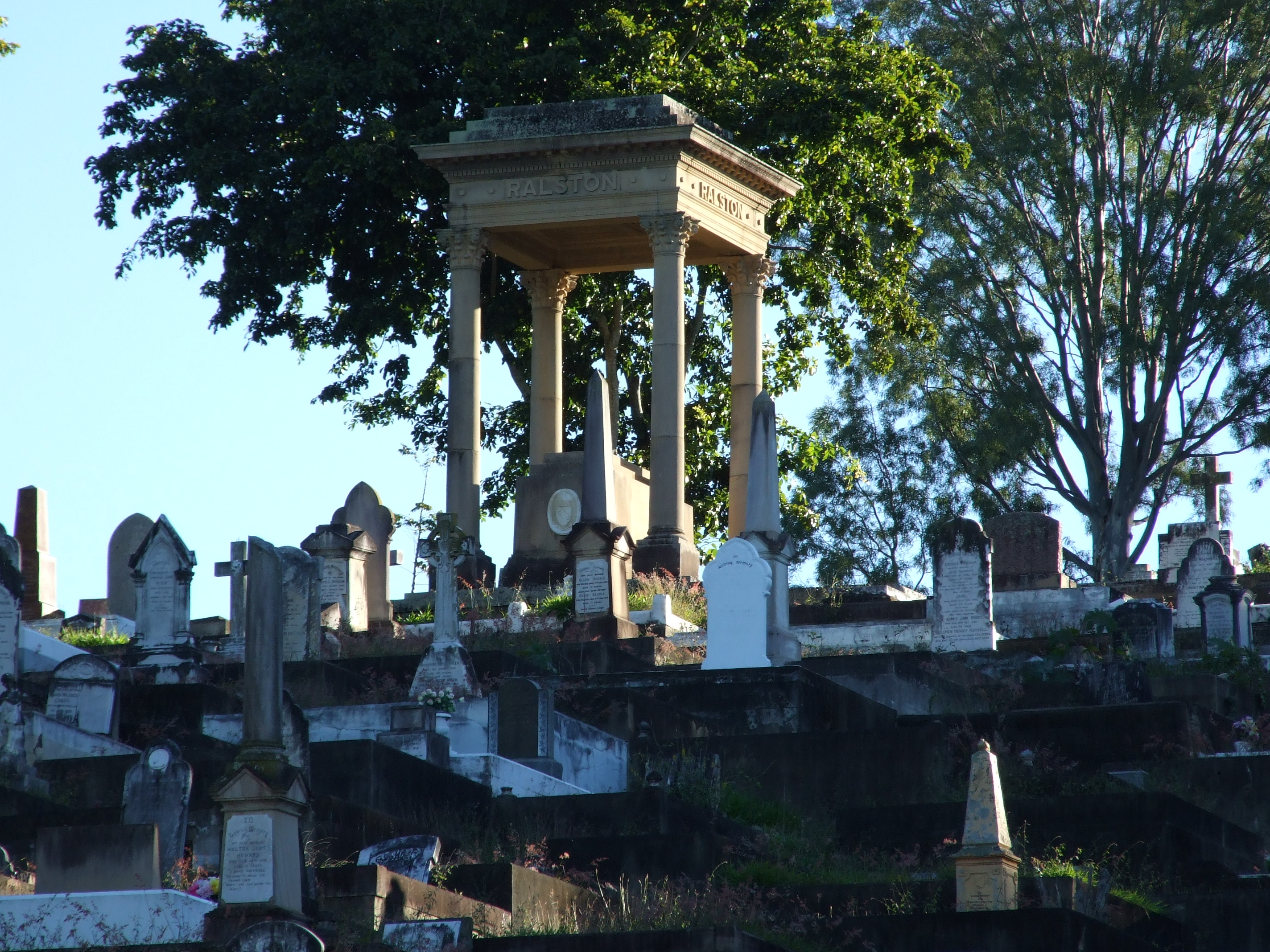

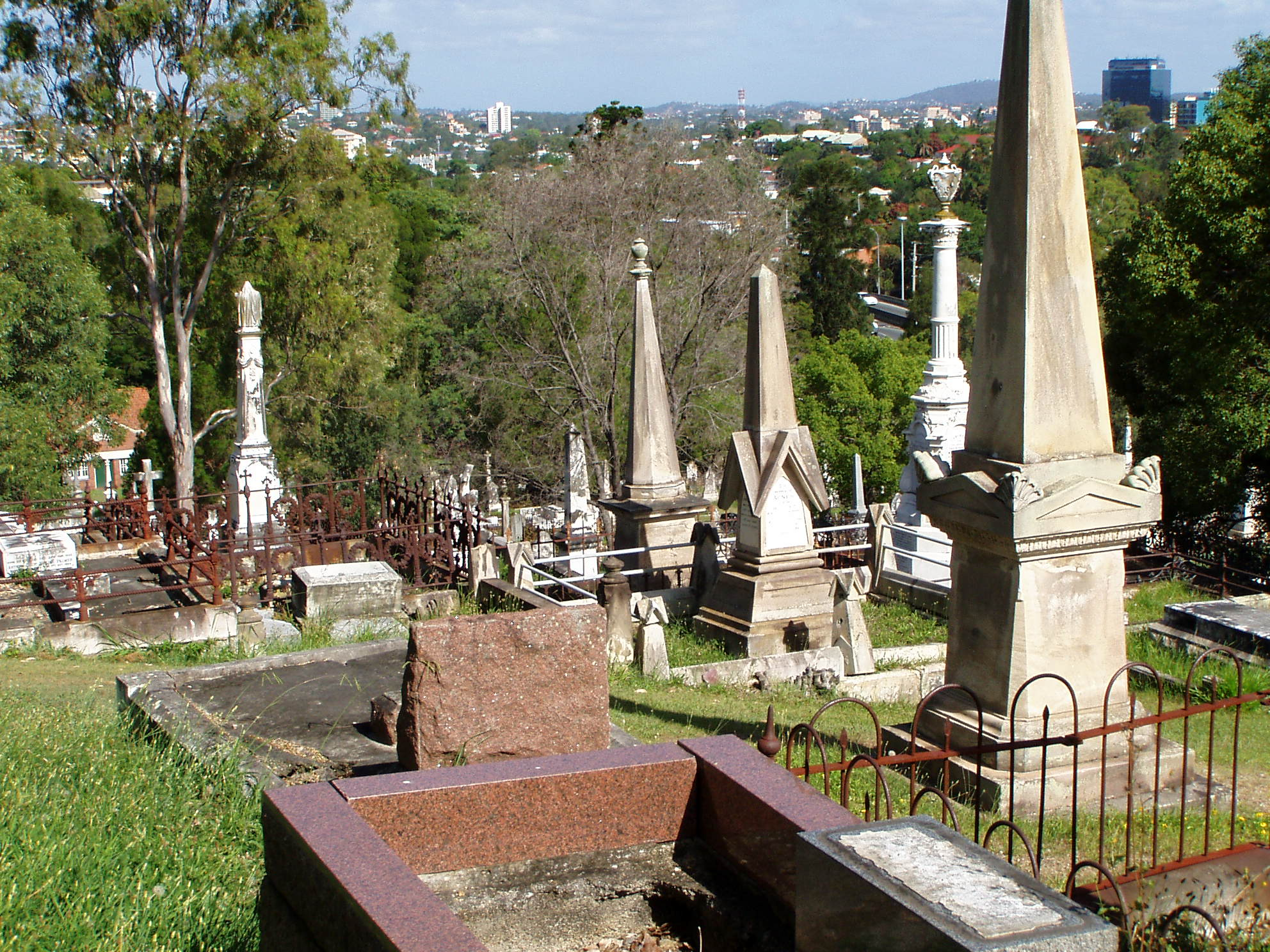

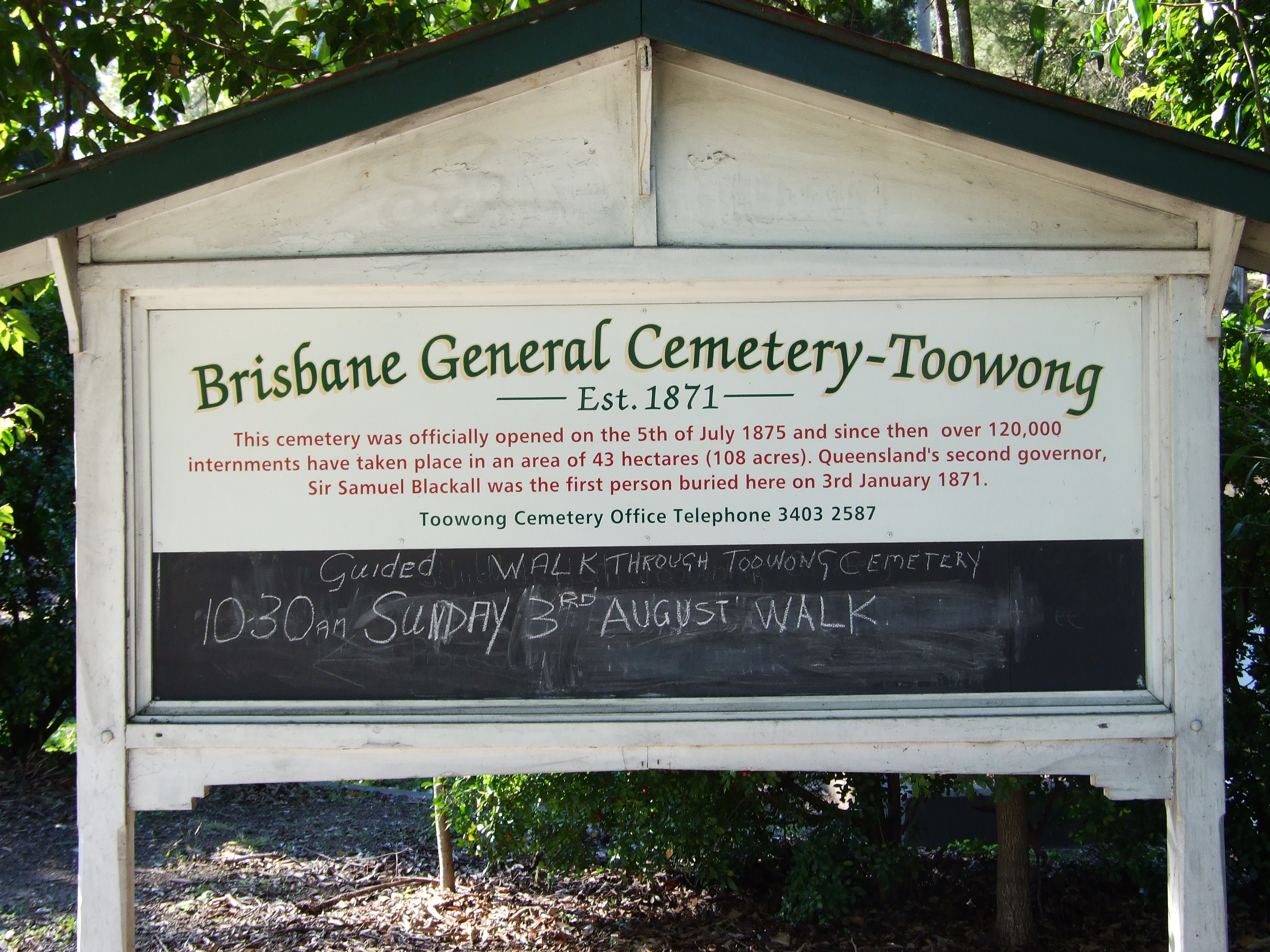

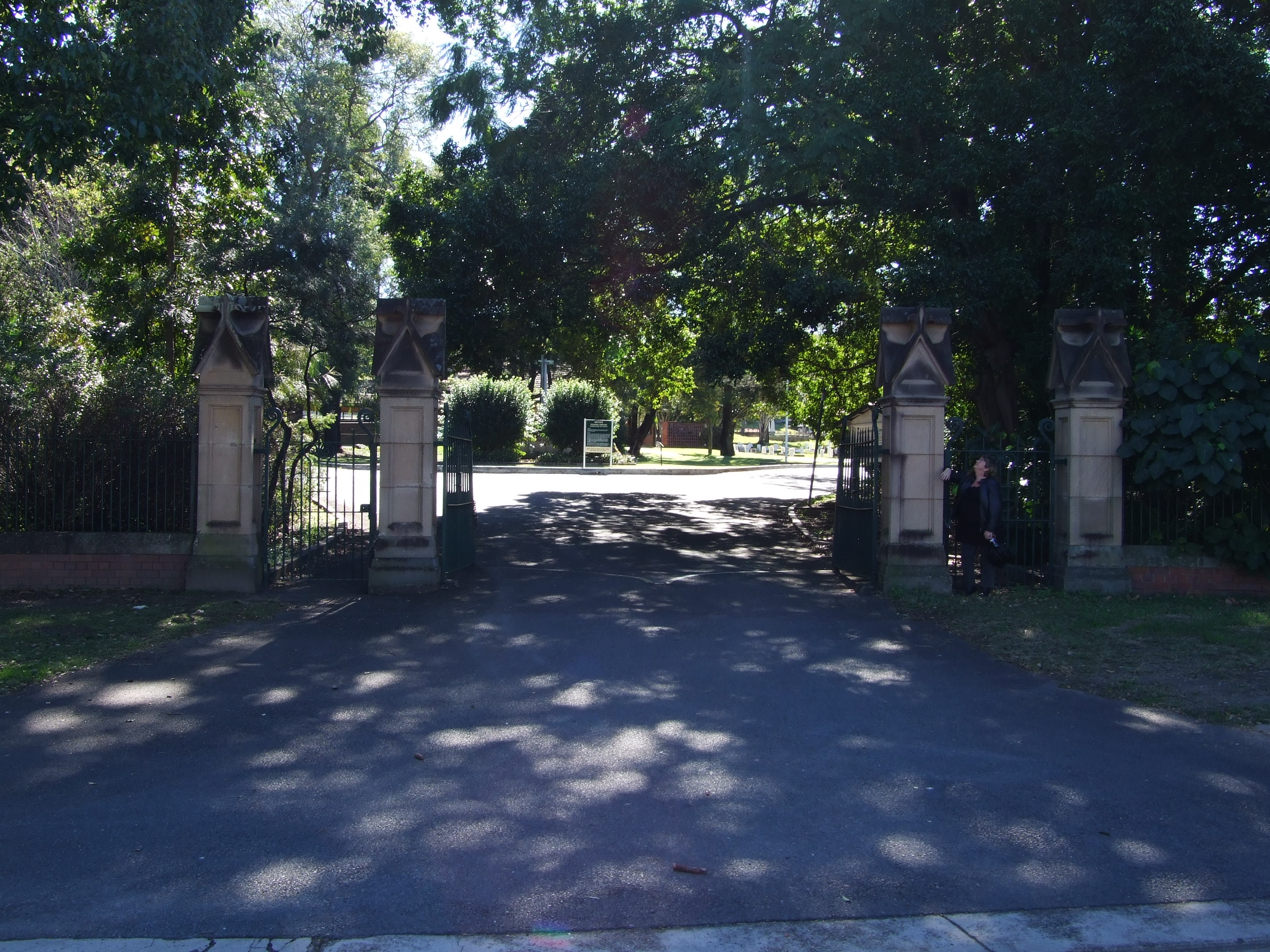

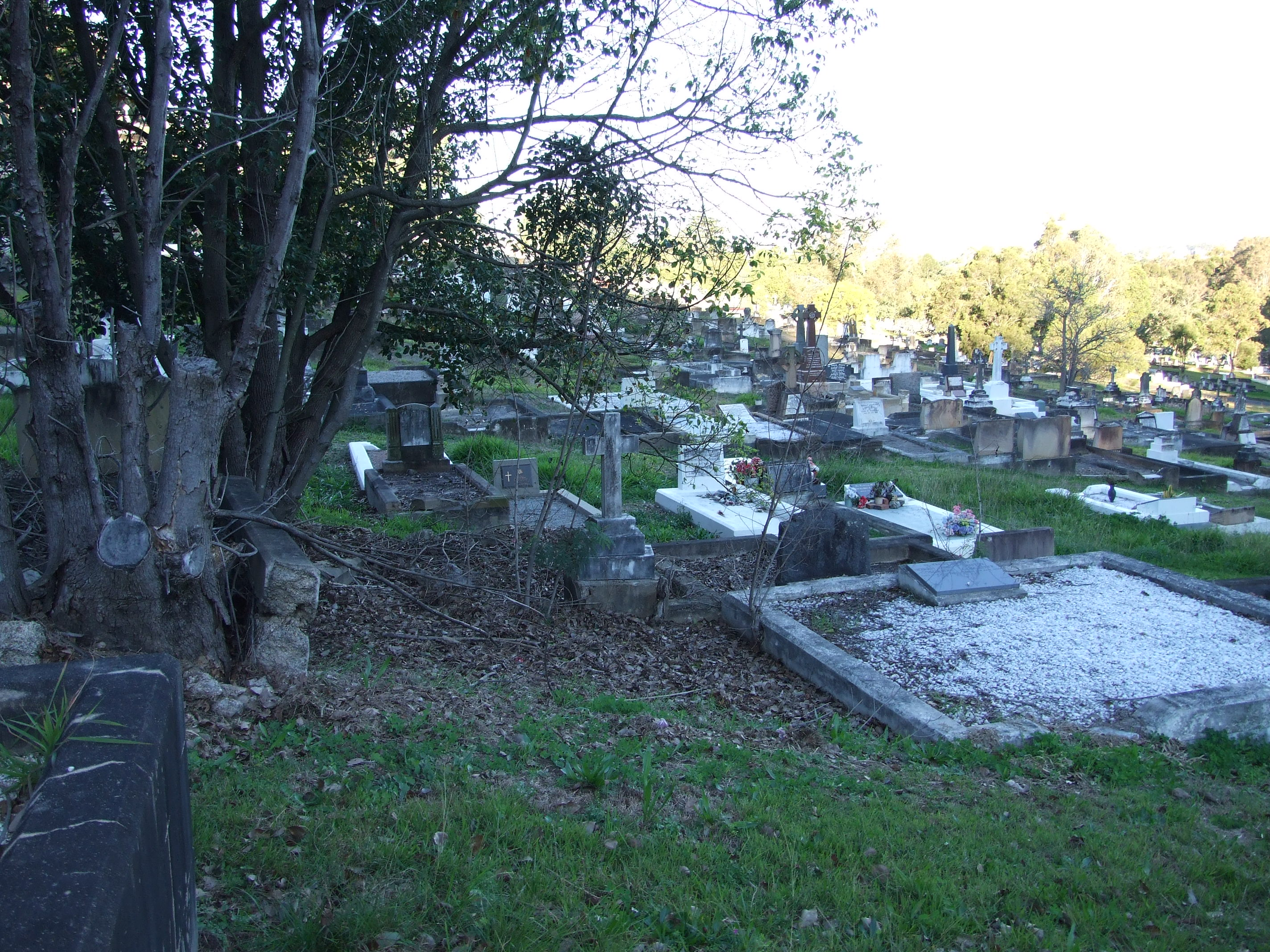

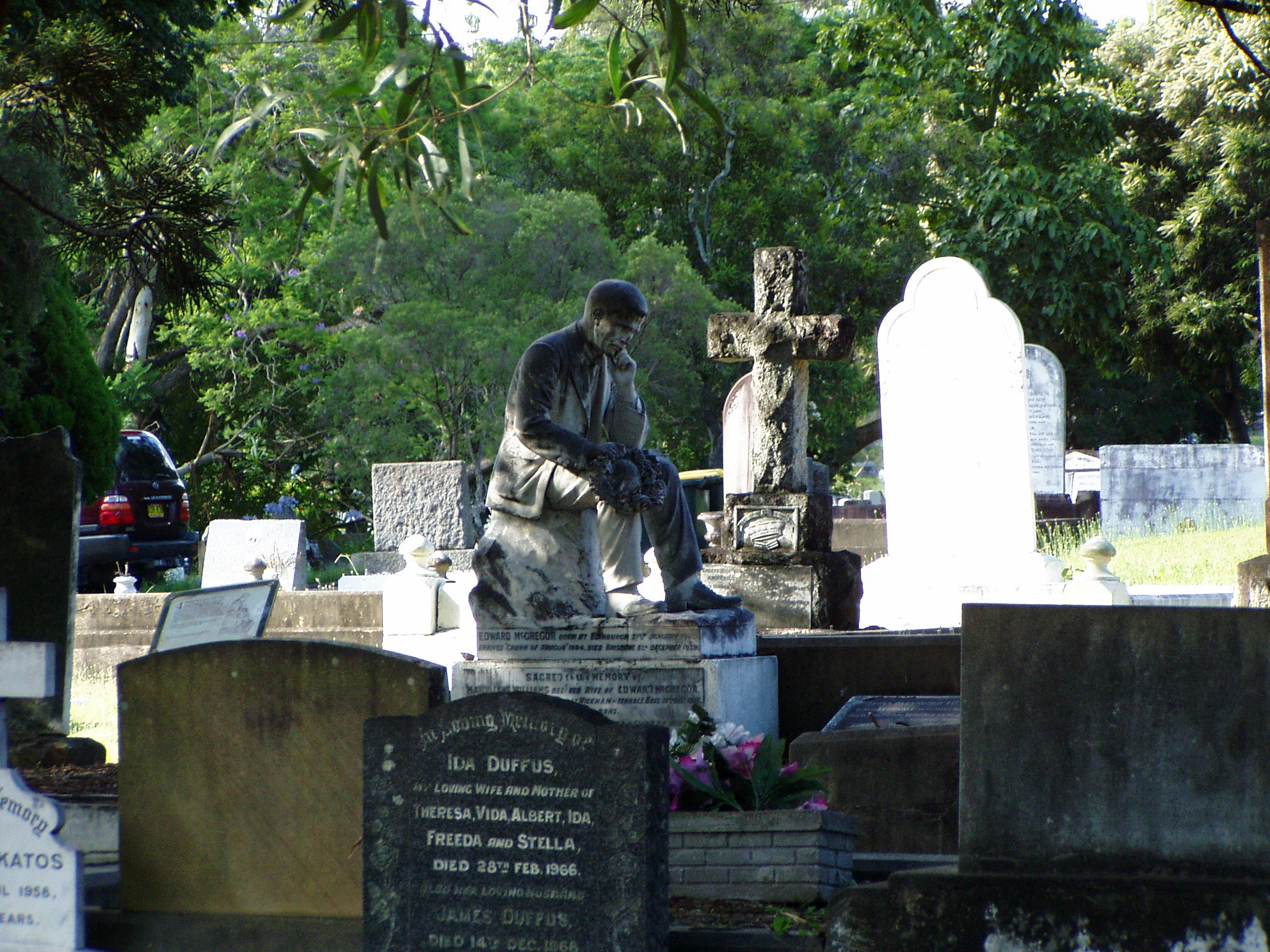

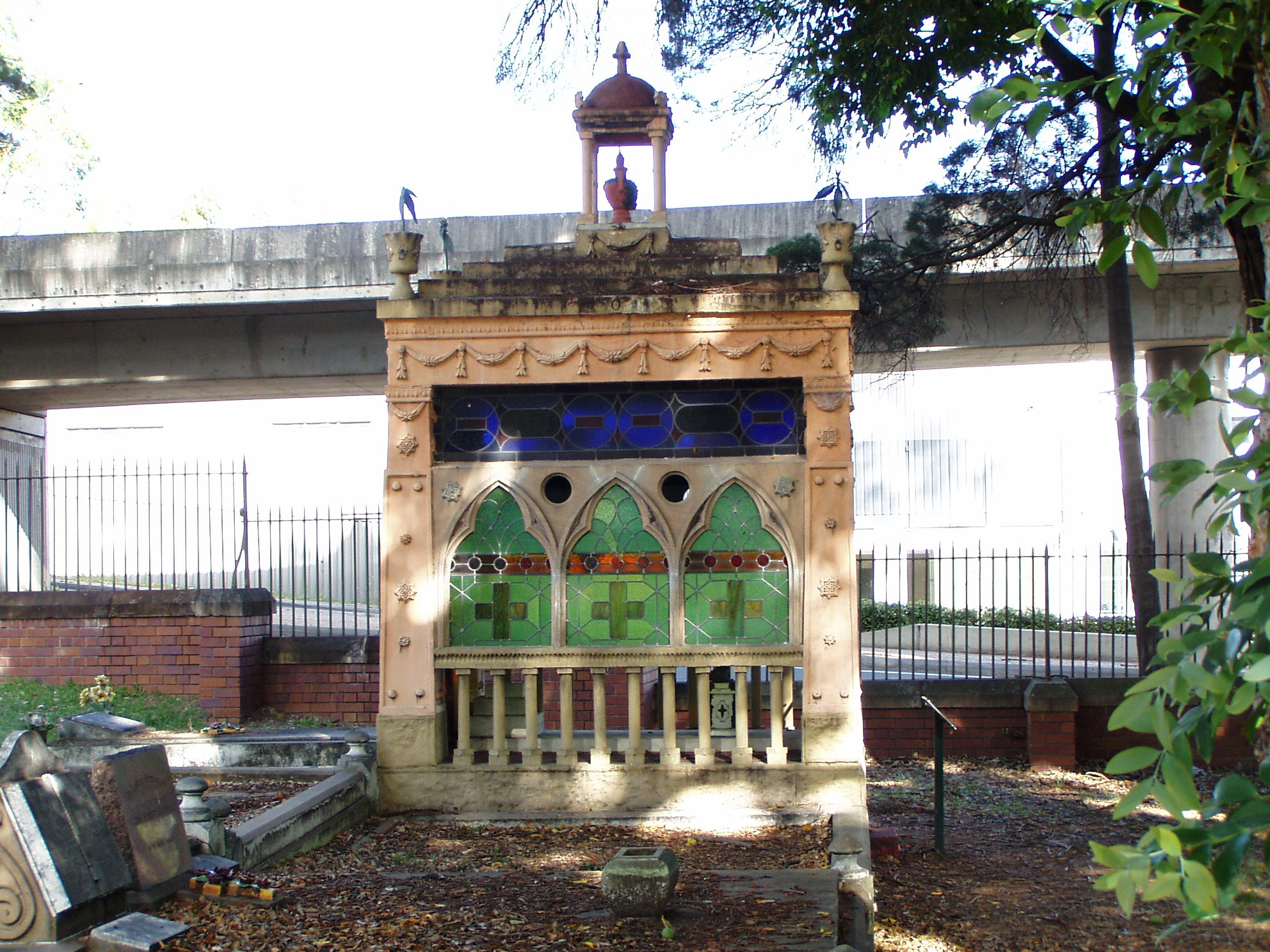

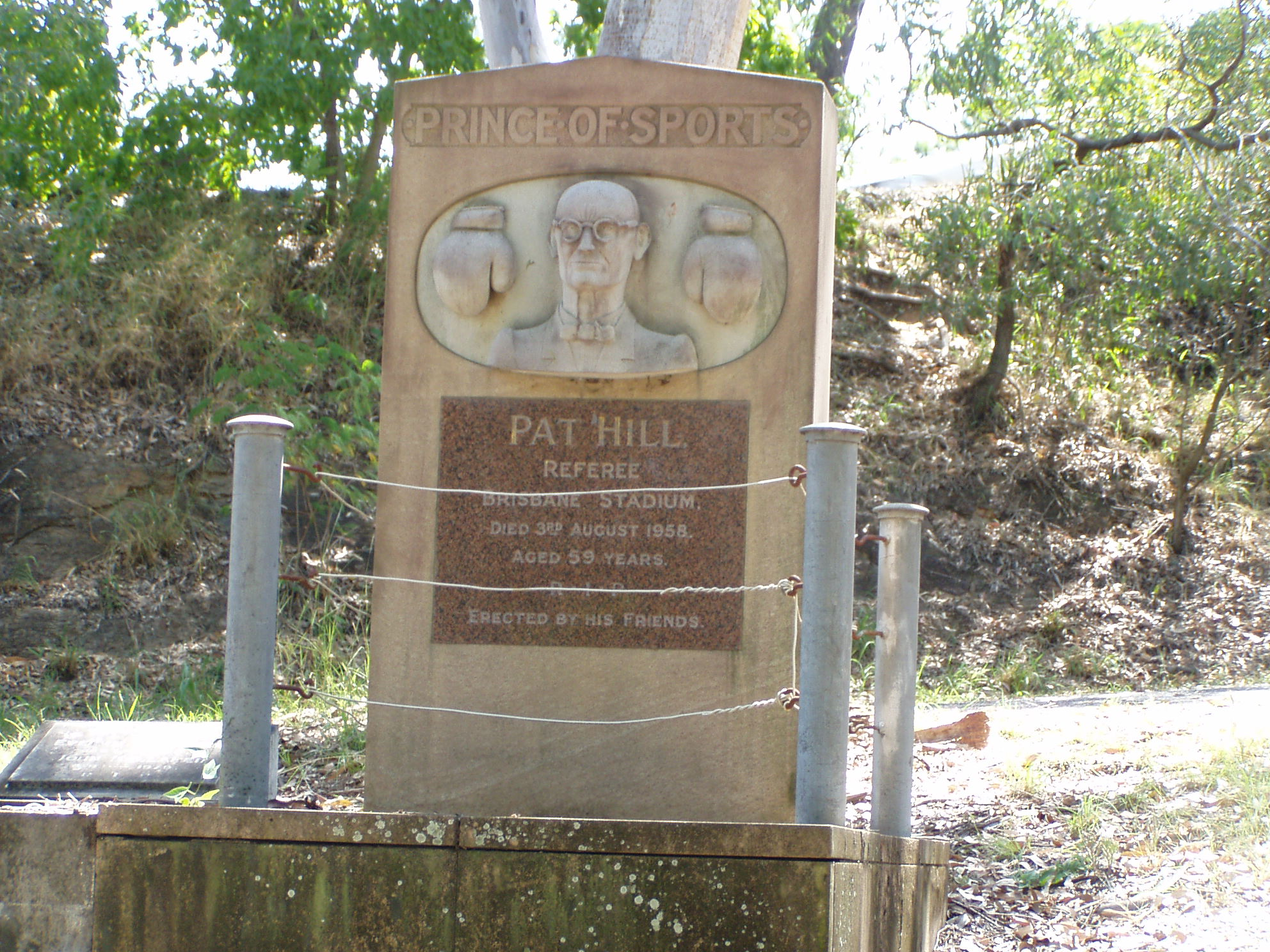

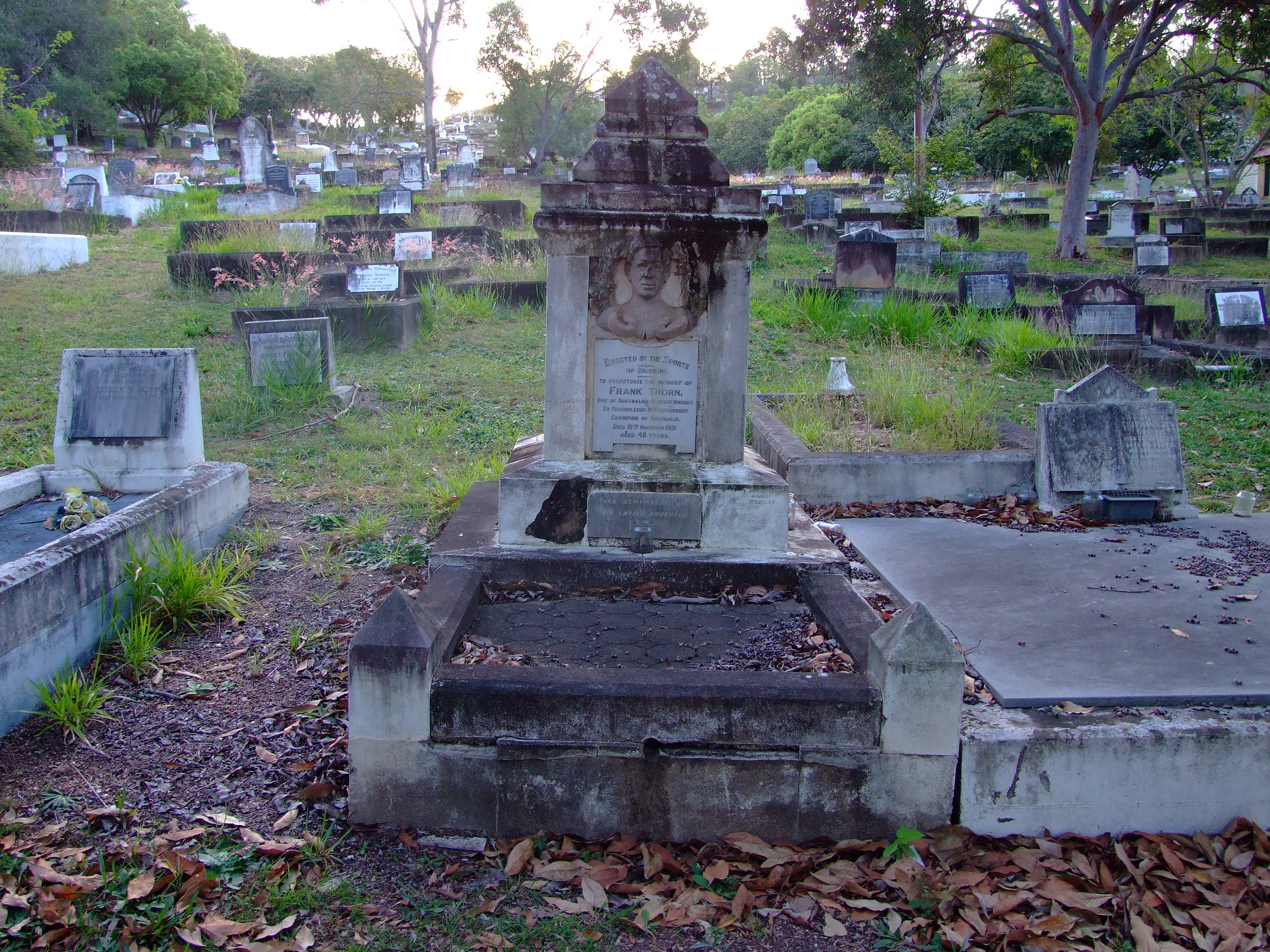

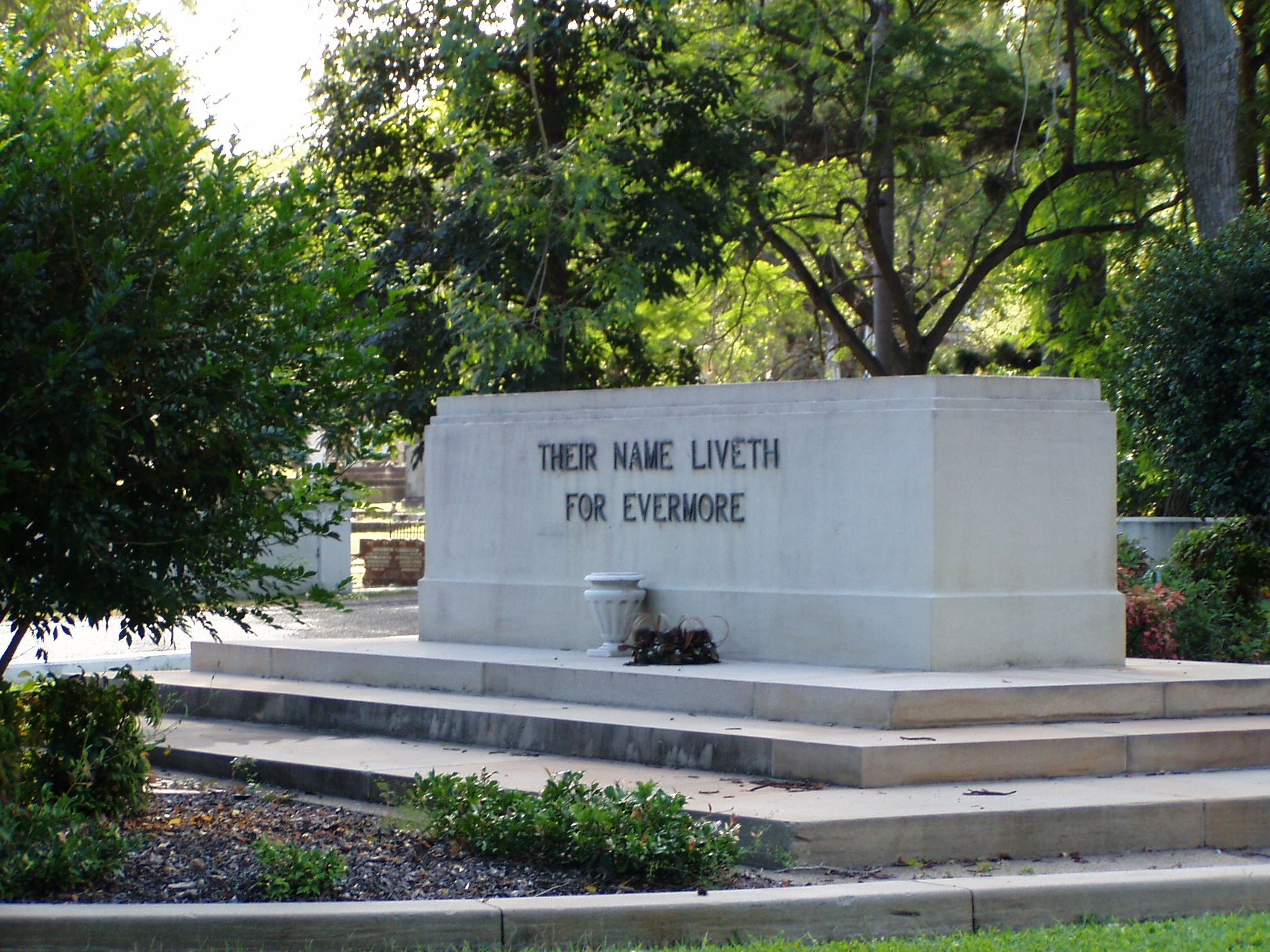

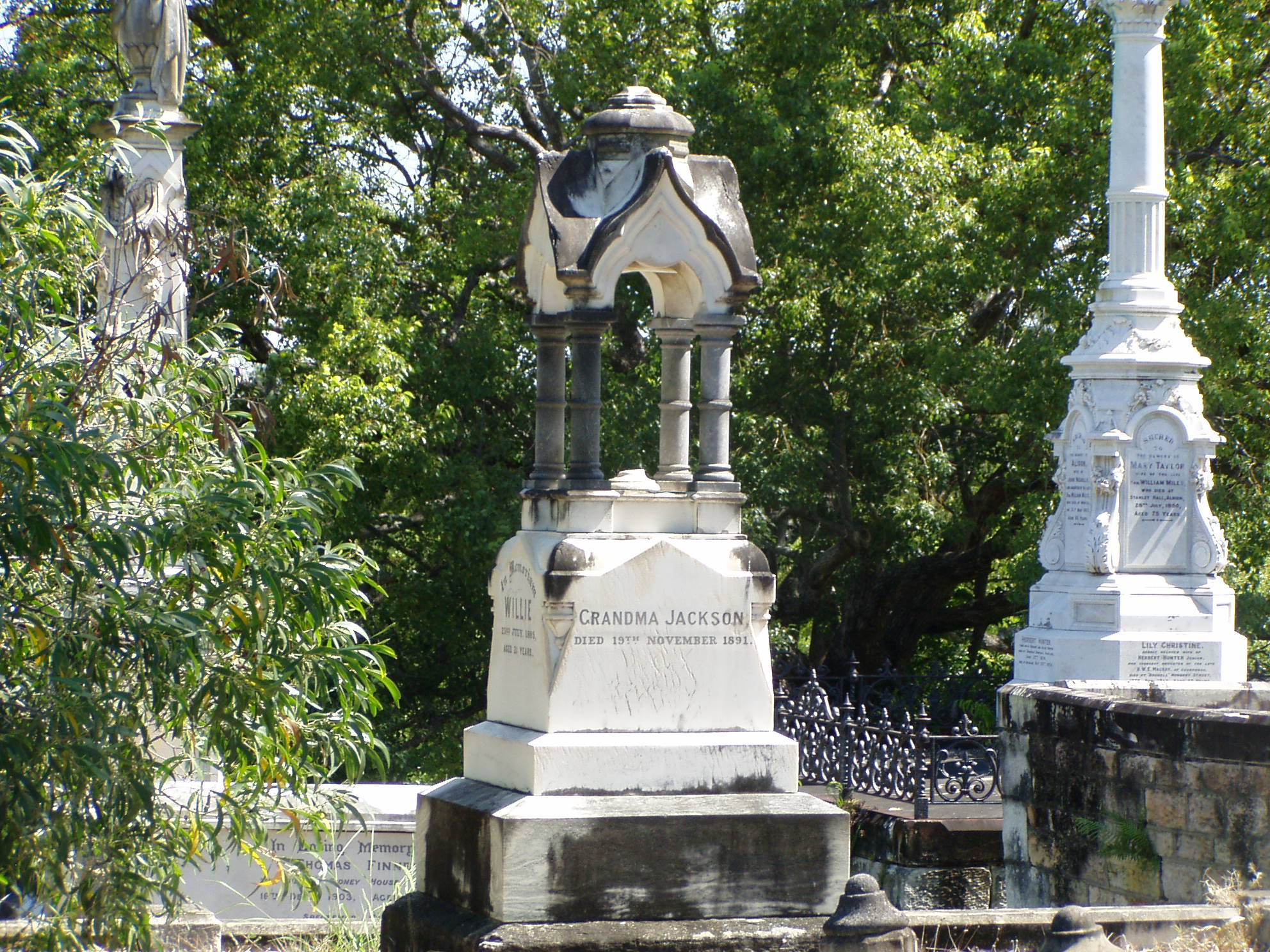

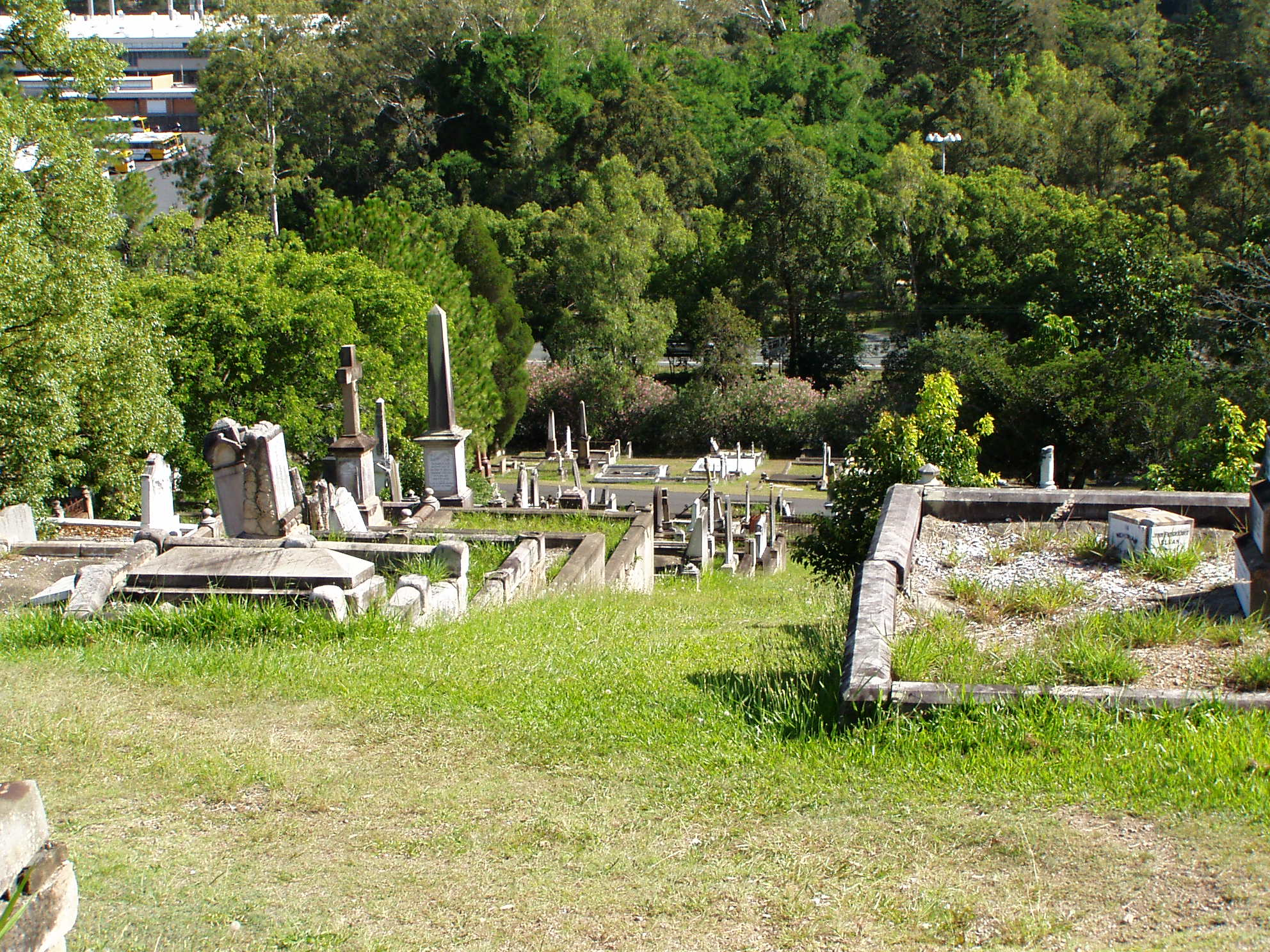

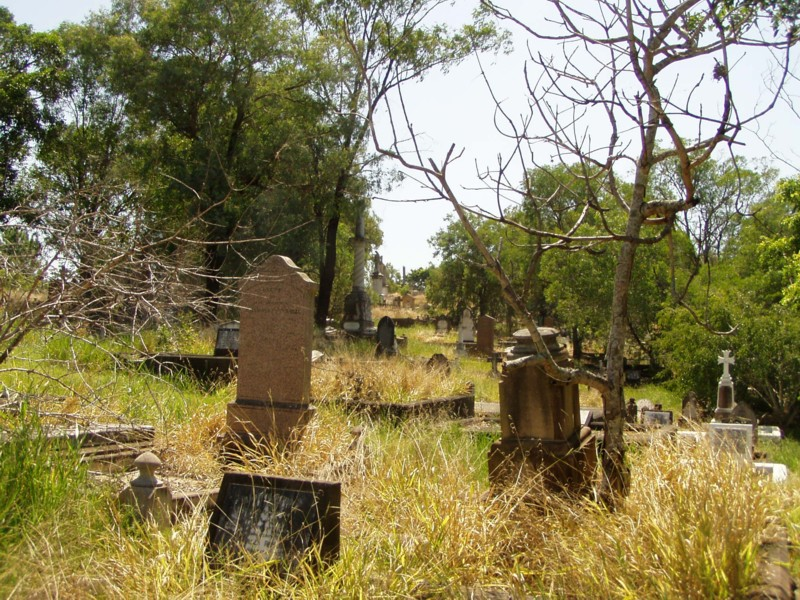

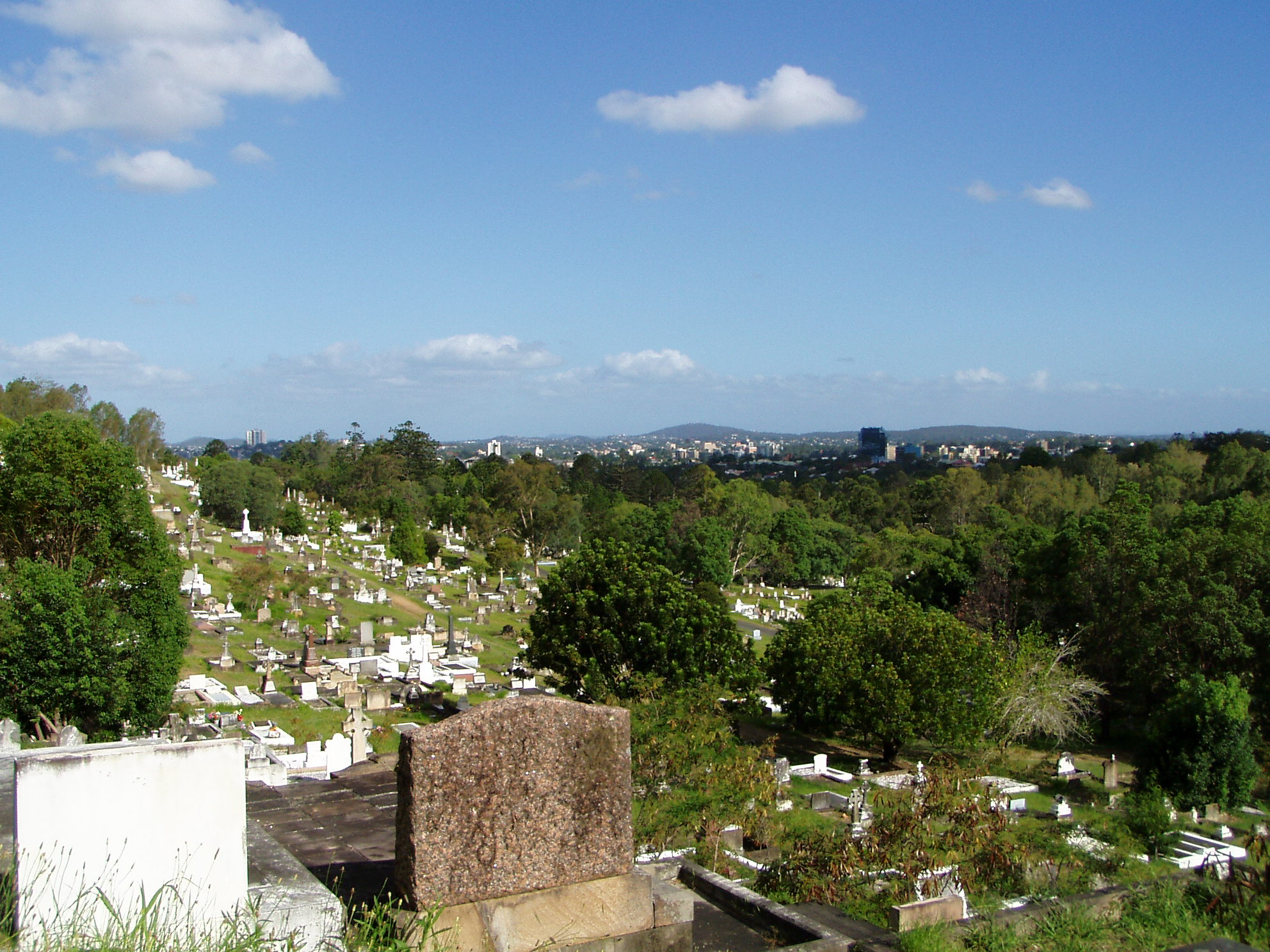
