= Joseph William Sutton =

Australian engineer, shipbuilder and inventor

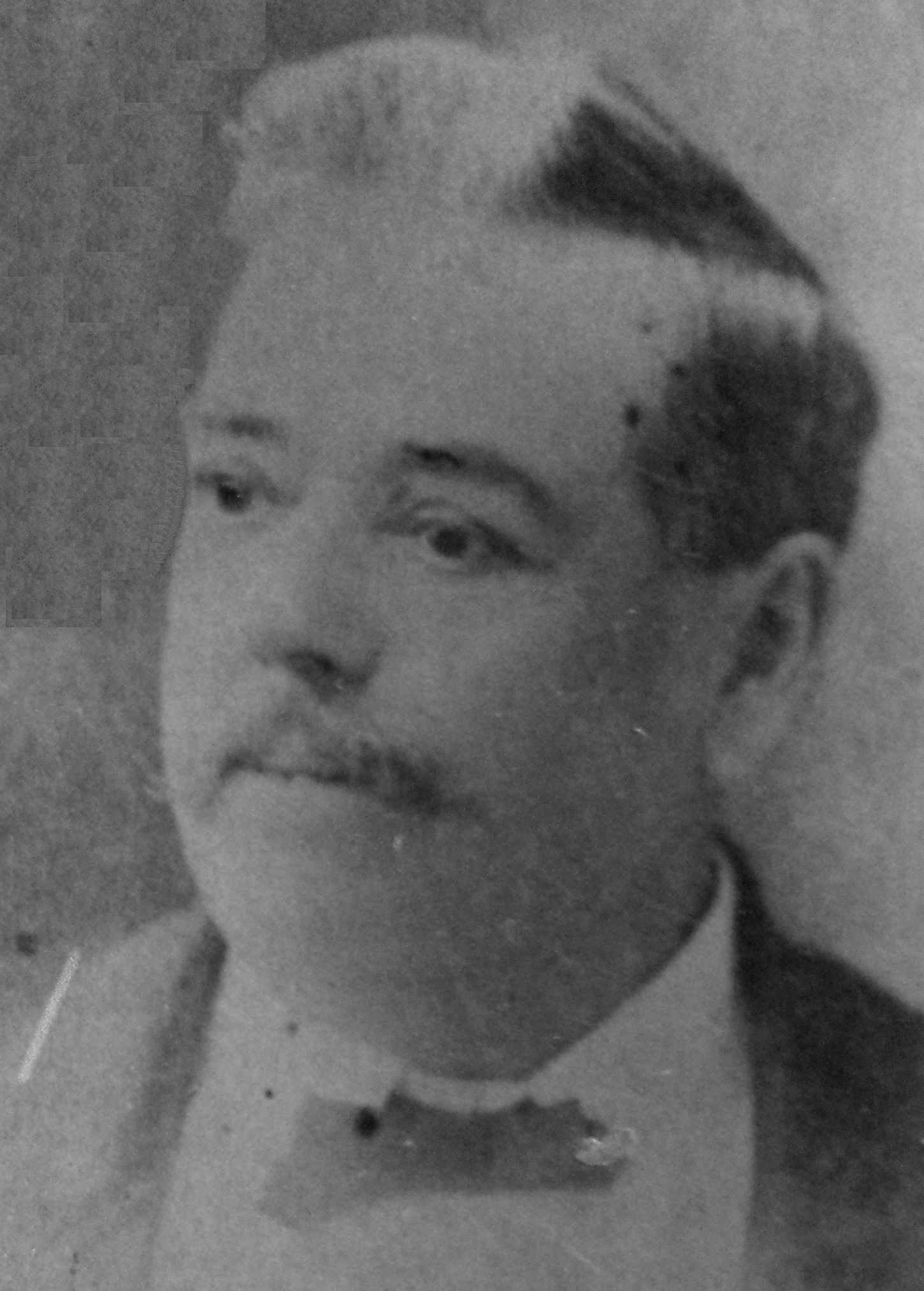
- Born: 21 October 1844; Stepney, London, England
- Died: 21 February 1914 (aged 69)
- Occupation: Engineer

Joseph William Sutton (21 October 1844 – 21 February 1914), identified in the print media as J. W. Sutton, was an Australian engineer, shipbuilder, inventor, pioneer in electric lighting and x-ray pioneer in Queensland.

== Life and times ==
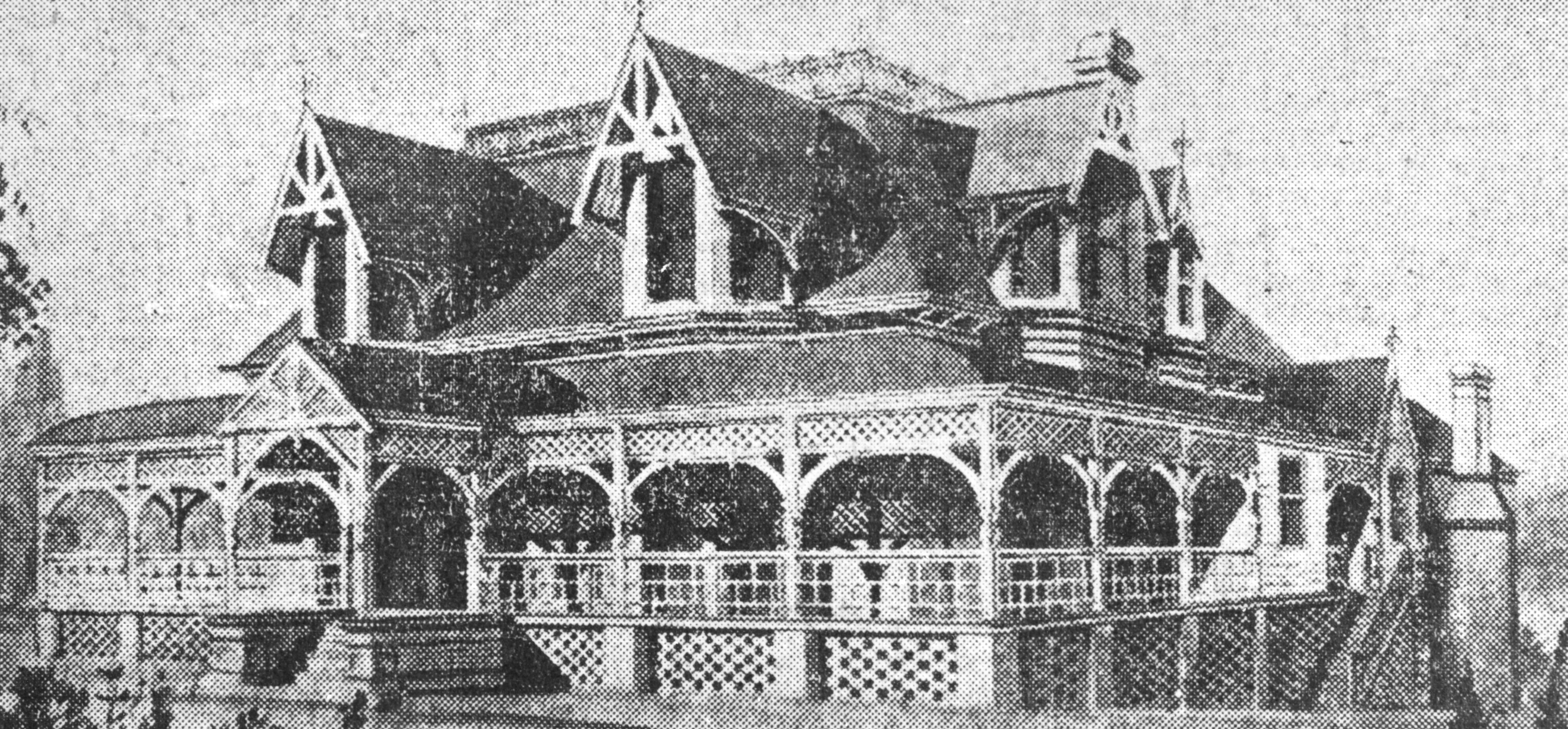
Hurlton, Chelmer, 1928

In 1844, Sutton was born in Stepney, London, England. His parents were George Sutton (Shipwright) and Elizabeth Kemmesat. He was christened on 1 December 1844. After Elizabeth's death, the George Sutton with three of his children (Hannah, Henry and Joseph) moved from London and arrived in Sydney 15 October 1852 on board the "Coldstream". (A year later Hannah and Henry were married in the same service 22 December 1853, to Daniel McLauchlan and Jemima Evans respectively at Christ Church St Laurence). Joseph married Mary Hurley (15 September 1847 – 11 July 1926) on 21 October 1869 in Balmain, Sydney. They lived for many years in "Stonehenge" on Bowen Terrace, overlooking the foundry on Kangaroo point. The couple built a home, Hurlton (a name derived from their surnames Hurley and Sutton) in Laurel Avenue, Chelmer in Brisbane. After the death of his widow, Hurlton was purchased in 1928 by William Robert Black, a philanthropist who donated it to the Presbyterian Church for use as a children's home; the house, which is highly modified, is now listed on the Brisbane Heritage Register.

Sutton was a prominent figure in Brisbane at the end of the 19th century. Throughout his life, he was keen on experimenting and inventing. Of particular note is the invention of the gold extraction process, which was utilized at the Mount Morgan field. Sutton was interested in the early development of telephones, electric lights and Rontgen rays.

== Personal life ==
Family:

- Ellen O'Donnel, (b.27 Sept 1870, d. 2 Jan. 1951), married William Charles Costin (Charles William) Clerk of the Legislative Council and Clerk of Parliaments.
- Mary Allen, (b. 11 April 1872, d. 26 Feb 1935), married Edward Barton, a prominent electrical engineer and member of the Queensland Legislative Assembly.
- Joseph William Sutton jun., (b. 10 September 1874, d. 20 Aug. 1941), A.M.I.E.E. was a prominent electrical engineer for the Postmaster General, Brisbane.
- George Moorehead, (b. July 1876, d. 1 Jun 1879.
- Georgina Moorehead, (b. 1879, d. 1926).
- Helen Allison, (b. 1881, d. 1 July 1903), married Henry Beresford Cox Corfield.
- Sylvia Lenore, (b. 1888, d. 2 September 1888).
- Sutton died 21 Feb. 1914 and was buried at Toowong Cemetery in Brisbane. At the time they were living at "Inglenenk" Gladstone Road South Brisbane. The Sutton family plot has been long gone, and is now a grassy patch.

== Early career ==
Joseph received his education in Sydney then indentured at the Sydney firm of John Fitzpatrick, coppersmith. One year after Sutton became a journeyman, he moved to Brisbane. In May 1870, he started business with his friend James Hipwood as Hipwood and Sutton. The partners, with others, started the Bulimba Smelting Works, Mr. Sutton taking the position of manager. To illustrate the language and sign of the times, the following advertisement of 9 June 1870 in The Brisbane Courier is provided.

Notice.

To all those interested in Sugar Making, Distilling, Brewing, Engineering, &c. Messrs. HIPWOOD & SUTTON will commence business as COPPERSMITHS, BRASSFOUNDERS, FINISHERS, PLUMBERS, &c. about MONDAY, June 13, and are prepared to execute any orders that they may be favored with. Vacuum, Wetzel, Bour, and Tache Pans, Clarifiers, &c.; Rum Stills from 100 to 2000 gallons; Wine and Whiskey Stills, 15 to 100 gallons; Brewing Coppers and Tinned Copper Pipes of all sizes; Copper and Iron Pipes, Lamps, Oil Feeders, &c., and every requisite for the Engine Room. Address: Hipwood & Sutton, Northern Copper Works, Eagle-street, Brisbane. 4858. – The Brisbane Courier

The company of Hipwood and Sutton did business as coppersmiths and brassfounders, and remained in business until 1877, at which time the company disbanded.

== J. W. Sutton and Company ==
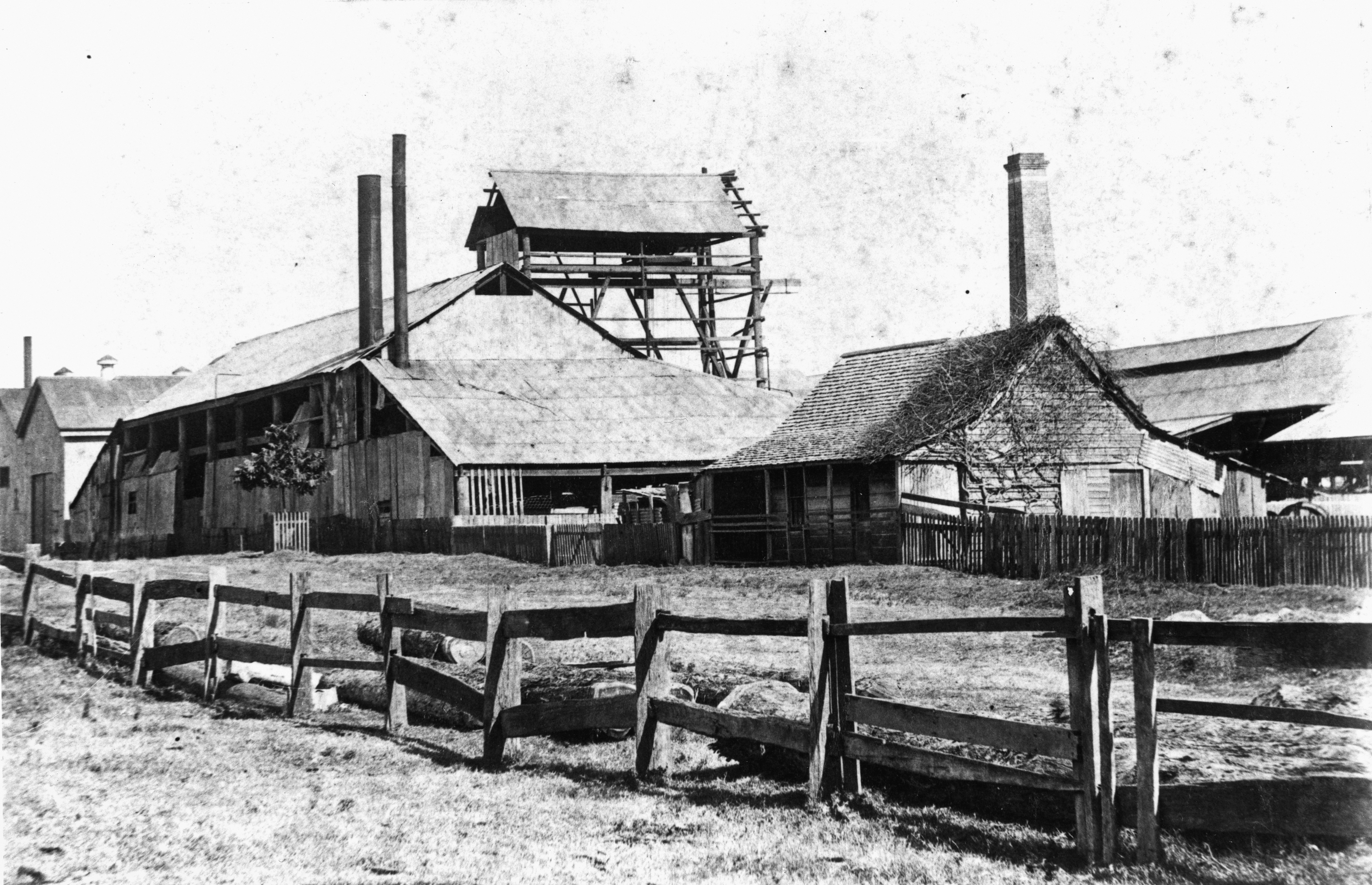
Sutton and Co. Foundry on Main Street, Kangaroo Point, Brisbane, circa 1890

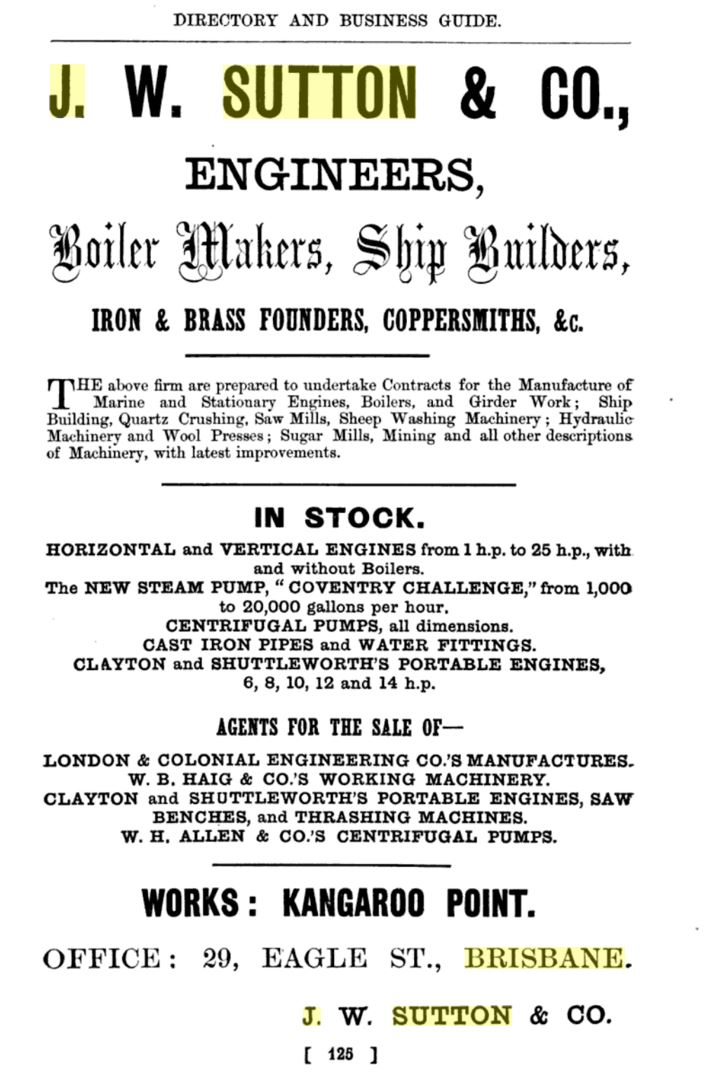
J. W. Sutton & Co. advertisement, 1888

Sutton reorganized and continued in business as J. W. Sutton and Company, Engineering Works. In 1880, the business was expanded to Kangaroo Point, as Sutton foresaw the growth of the company to meet the needs of the sugar industry and the engineering trades. At Kangaroo Point, two partners were brought into the business, W. Bussell and W. Hiley.

In the 1880s the J. W. Sutton and Company's shipbuilding yard and foundry was a prominent industrial complex at Kangaroo Point. Prior to establishing J. W. Sutton and Company, Sutton was manager at the tin smelting works and foundry at Bulimba. There is a good description of the company in "The Queenslander" 17 June 1883. At this point they employed about 200 men at Kangaroo Point works.

In 1885, the city directory listed the business: "SUTTON, J. W., and Co. (J. W. Sutton and W. Hiley), engineers, iron and brass founders, coppersmiths, and iron ship builders, 29 Eagle street; tel. 43. Works, Kangaroo Point; tel. 48". The listing (presumably Sutton's residence) that preceded this entry was: "Sutton, J. W. (J. W. Sutton and Co.), Stonehenge, Bowen terrace". Pugh's Almanac in 1885 listed J.W. Sutton and Co. at Kangaroo Point as a boat and ship builder; as coppersmith and brass founders at 25 Eagle-street and Kangaroo Point; as engineers and iron-founders at Eagle-street with boiler works at Kangaroo Point, smelter and assayer at Eagle-street. The Alexandra Mine and Battery at Palmerville Station, Maytown, Queensland was equipped with a battery plant. The battery plant that supplied electricity included a Cornish boiler in a brick mount with a flue leading to an intact nine metre high metal chimney. The Cornish boiler was manufactured by J. W. Sutton & Co. The firm provided materials and aided in bridge construction for the South Coast railway line in Queensland. In addition, several key sugar factories were equipped with machinery from J. W. Sutton and Co. During the floods of 1893, the original foundry was destroyed. Sutton rebuilt the foundry and was flooded again in the same year. Not long after, the company was sold to Evans, Anderson and Phelan.

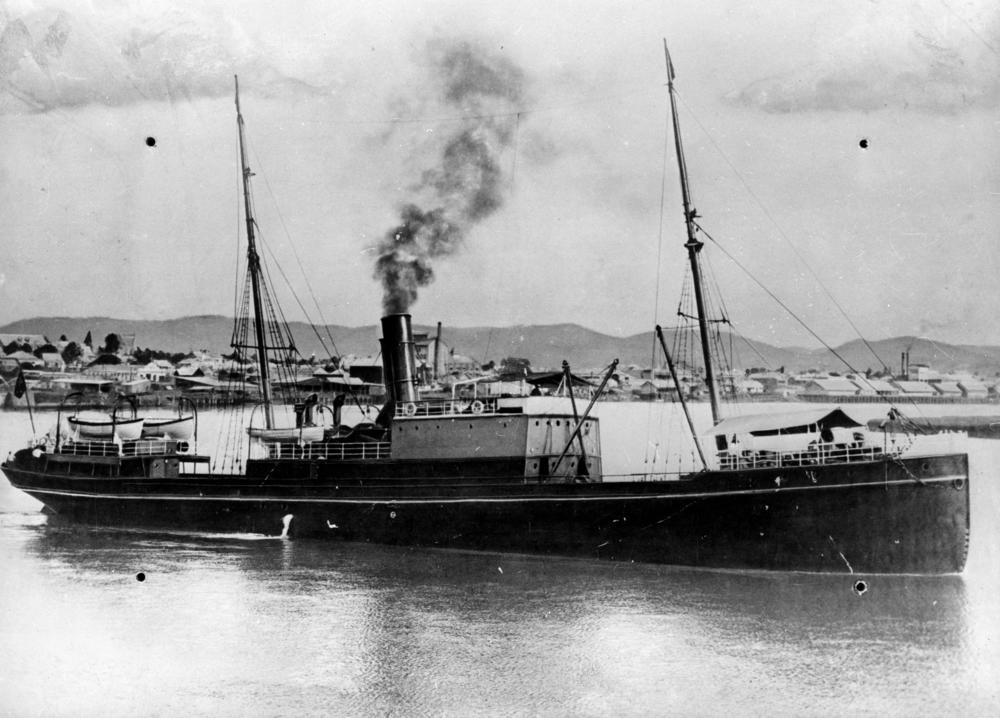
Iceberg, built by JW Sutton at Kangaroo Point

== Kitson Lighting and Heating Company Limited ==
Joseph William Sutton was a manager and consultant engineer. At the end of 1902 Sutton took an extensive trip to Europe and America for the Kitson Light Co. An article on this trip was written in the Brisbane Courier 17 Jan 1903 entitled "An Australian in England and America" From the Richmond River Express 17 Nov 1903: "On Saturday last Ald. Frost, who has been a consistent advocate for a trial of the Kitson light, for the purposes of, town lighting, was kept busy with the able electrical engineer, Mr. J. Sutton, who was sent from Brisbane by the Kitson Light Co. to instal the lamp at the intersection of Walker and Canterbury streets, in putting up the iron post and fixing the necessary machinery for the production of the light."

== Electrical pioneer ==
On 9 December 1882, at Brisbane Queensland, the public was introduced to electricity by having a demonstration that utilized eight arc lights, erected along Queen Street. The lamps were erected on 20 foot cast iron standards. The power to supply these arc lights was taken from a 10 horsepower Crompton DC generator driven by a Robey steam engine in the foundry of J. W. Sutton & Co. at Adelaide Street. Later, the Brisbane Courier newspaper received electricity supplied from the foundry of J. W. Sutton at Foundry Lane, later called Isles Lane (now the site of a multi storey building). The power was from a 10 hp Crompton DC generator. On 10 December 1882, the J. W. Sutton & Co. offices at Adelaide Street in Brisbane were lighted by electricity for the first time in Queensland. Sutton was the father-in-law of Edward Barton who was also heavily involved in Brisbane's electric lighting. From The Telegraph, Brisbane; 24 Feb 1921. "Mr. W. M. L'Estrange, of the Ipswich Electric Supply Company, Limited; had stated that the residence of Mr. C. Hardie Buzacott, of Chelmer, was one of the first houses in Australia to be lit up by electric light, as Mr. Buzacott had brought a plant out from England about the year 1887, and which he had installed at his residence for lighting purposes. Mr. L'Estrange also stated that about the same time Mr. Sutton, of Laurel, avenue, Chelmer also installed an electric plant at his residence, and, that probably Mr. Sutton's residence with that of Mr. Buzacott's could be claimed to be the first private dwellings to be lit up by electricity in Australia."

== Education pioneer ==
Sutton was keenly involved in all things educational. Sutton was a founding member of the Brisbane Technical College from September 1882. The college was originally part of the Brisbane School of Arts. In November 1892 Sutton was involved in organising the separation from the School of Arts. Sutton became the chairman of the subcommittee (1897), handling the separation and obtaining a new building. By 1900 Sutton was Chairman of the Brisbane Technical College 1899–1901. In Aug 1900 Sutton was appointed a member of the council of the Brisbane Technical College. By donating to the building fund Mr and Mrs Sutton became life members of the college. Sutton was reappointed to the council in November 1903. He remained as an ordinary member till post 1904. Sutton was also involved with having physics as a foundation discipline in its own right included in the curriculum for the University of Queensland. Post 1904 Sutton's health (most likely deteriorating from his exposure to radiation from X-rays as well as to radium) caused him to slowly withdraw from public life.

== Photographic pioneer ==
Joseph William Sutton was involved in the very beginning of the Queensland Photographic Society: From "The Week" newspaper Brisbane Sat 20 Sept 1884: "PHOTOGRAPHIC SOCIETY.—The newly formed Queensland photographers' society held a meeting on Monday in rooms over Sloss', confectioners, Queen-street. There was a good attendance of members. The following officers were elected for the ensuing year:—President, the Hon A. C. Gregory; vice-presidents, Professor Pepper, and Mr. J. W. Sutton; secretary, Mr. J. R. Hall; committee, Messrs. Rickardo, Lyons, and Service." From the beginning Sutton was often availing his steamers to be used to take members along the Brisbane river for photo shoots, as seen from The Brisbane Courier 17 Feb 1885: "The chairman (Sutton on this occasion) notified his intention of taking the members down the Bay, probably on Saturday next, for the purpose of giving them an opportunity to exhibit their skill in "snapping" pretty glimpses of river scenery." In these early days many of the society meetings were held at the Sutton household: Brisbane Courier 25 Jan 1886. "A MEETING of the Queensland Photographic Society was held on Saturday evening at Mr. J.W. Sutton's house. Mr. Sutton, who is vice-president, took the chair..... Mr Sutton very kindly placed his large veranda at the disposal of the members, together with the use of his dark-room for practical demonstrations on the nights of meeting, and also his optical lanterns for exhibitions of transparencies, which generous offer was accepted with a hearty vote of thanks." The Telegraph 17 Mar 1886: "The monthly meeting of the Queensland Photographic Society was held at Mr. J. W. Sutton's house on Monday evening. That gentleman presided....... Mr. Sutton exhibited specimens of prints done with Morgan and Kidd's contact paper, and promised to give a practical demonstration of the process on the next meeting night." The Brisbane Courier 27 July 1886: "A CONVERSAZIONE was held last night at the School of Arts by the Queensland Photographic Society to celebrate the first anniversary of their formation..... The society, which had just completed its first year, at first encountered great difficulties, but through the kindness of several of their members – notably Mr. J. W. Sutton, who had placed many facilities they could not otherwise have obtained at their disposal, they had been very successful. The society now numbered 133 members, and had a satisfactory balance at the bank at its disposal." The Brisbane Courier 1887: "The second annual conversazione of the Queensland Photographic Society was held last night in the lecture hall of the Y.M.C.A. with great success...At 9 o'clock Mr J. W. Sutton exhibited, by means of the oxy-hydrogen limelight, a large collection of lantern-slides. This exhibition opened with a number of very fine views of Melbourne buildings and streets and Victorian scenery." The New Photography; Sutton was the first in Brisbane to demonstrate X-Rays and X-Ray photography, only four months after Roentgen's discovery 29 February 1896. Prof. Lyle being the first in Australia on 4 April 1896, followed by Prof. Bragg 30 May 1896.

== Displays and awards gained at the Queensland Exhibition ==
- Nov 1875: Silver medal, value £3: J. W. Sutton, smelted tin. Certificate of merit: J. W. Sutton, mineral cabinet.
- 1876: J. W. Sutton, Mineral specimens: First-class. J. W. Sutton, Tin block trophy: Highly commended. Hipwood and Sutton, Bells: First prize
- 1877: Scientific instruments displayed by Messrs. J. W. Sutton and Co.
- 1878: Microphone made and exhibited by Mr. J. W. Sutton. Telephones, of which there are several, exhibited by Mr. W. J. Cracknell and H. Starke of the Telegraph Department, and Mr, J. W. Sutton

"The prismatic (or fairy) fountain, which has been constructed by Mr. J. W. Sutton for the council of the National Association, was tried on Friday evening, and was found to act admirably; it is placed under the dome of the building, and will add greatly to the beauty of the exhibition, while tending to keep the atmosphere cool and pleasant."

- 1879: Judge

== Sugar industry inventor ==
In 1878, Sutton developed a better method to extract sugar from sugar cane juice.

"What looks like a decided improvement upon the open air methods hitherto followed to evaporate cane juice has just been patented by Messrs. J. W. Sutton and Co., coppersmiths, Brisbane. Mr. Sutton aims at evaporating juice at a heat of from 120° to 180°. This he does in the open air. He obtains the required temperature by means of a steam coil running around his evaporating pan, which is of the ordinary circular form. This heat will not boil the liquor, of course; that he accomplishes by menus of a perforated pipe or coil coming in at the bottom of the evaporating pan. Through this latter coil, a current of air is forced by a fan blast. The air may either be of atmospheric temperature, or it may be heated, as seems most desirable. In the event of heated air being forced into the liquor, or through it, the air is passed through furnaces in a series of pipes, by which means it becomes highly rarefied, and the temperature is raised at the same time. We have seen the apparatus at work, cold air being used, and there was a particularly brisk ebullion, while the temperature of the liquid at first barely marked 130°. Mr. Sutton's calculation at the time was that three gallons were evaporated per hour from each superficial foot of liquid while the temperatures was 180°. The evaporation was certainly very rapid, and the temperature completely under control. Two pans upon this principle have been ordered, one by Mr. R. Muir, of Nerang, who intends to have it at work early next month. The advantage claimed are- at least double the ordinary rate of evaporation by open fire-boiling, with absolute security from burning, and perfect control over the entire apparatus, including facilities for skimming and cleaning the liquor and syrups on the boiling proceeds. Mr. Sutton has gone into this matter, as he has into other improvements, with energy and skill, and deserves the success likely to flow from his efforts."

"Messrs. J. W. Sutton and Co. have been granted a patent for an improvement in the manufacture of sugar, and, from the many trials to which it has lately been subjected, is pronounced by those most interested in judging its capabilities a very decided success."

"A trial of Messrs. J. and W. Sutton and Co's new patent atmospheric battery for concentrating cane juice was held yesterday afternoon at Mr. O. Randle's sugar plantation, Eagle Farm."

== X-ray pioneer ==
Sutton had been unsuccessfully trying to obtain x-rays experimenting with spent incandescent lamps and Geisler tubes, and it wasn't until he obtained Röntgen's Crookes tube that he finally became successful. In early July 1896, Sutton was the first to demonstrate X-rays in Brisbane for physician Dr. John Thompson. (See also The Queenslander, illustrated article; radiograph of keys and of hand, on 18 July page 117.) On 8 August 1896, at the invitation of the Royal Society of Queensland, Sutton performed a demonstration of Röntgen rays and in doing so left his mark in the annals of history an Australian pioneer of X-rays in Queensland. Sutton opened with a review of the historical aspects of what was known of the subject. Then he produced a diagram on the blackboard of the electromagnetic spectrum and reviewed the various portions that included the visible, ‘infrared’, ‘heat rays’, ‘ultraviolet’ spectrums and the 'unmapped rays'. An account of the evening recalled:

"He proceeded to state that photography had revealed the fact that photographically active rays extended a distance of nine or ten times the length of the visual spectrum. and both from the ultraviolet and the infrared portion of the spectrum; there emanated a long series of rays which, though quite invisible, possessed chemical energy and heat, and with which it was quite possible to make radiographs through many opaque substances, and it was supposed that somehow in these outskirts of the spectrum, the X-rays would be found if they are associated with light at all."

Sutton then explained the apparatus he had prepared to demonstrate. The contraption consisted of an electric battery and large induction coil which provided the electric current to illuminate the Crookes focus tube. He asked the audience to observe an ordinary vacuum tube or Geissler tube. He passed electric current through the tube, a large three-bulb tube, and the tube was instantly filled with the well-known phosphorescent glow. Sutton remarked that X-rays were emanating from the tube, but the rays were so diffuse as to be of no effect. Next, the Geissler tube was replaced by a Crookes tube. Electric current was passed through the Crookes tube. He explained that the Crookes tube had "a more complete vacuum" and "other improvements made". Sutton explained that it was necessary to make additional improvements and refinements in the vacuum tube which required "a more complete vacuum". The final step involved an arrangement of aluminium and platinum discs utilized to focus the X-rays. Further recollections of the evening:

"Having thus explained the apparatus, Mr. Sutton made several exposures of plates with remarkably good results. One interesting exposure was a collection of various articles, offering various degrees of opacity to the rays. The development of the plates was admirably carried out by Mr. Ferguson under circumstances decidedly unfavourable to such delicate work, with capital results. The exhibition of articles on the fluorescent screen, where the wonderful effects of the X-rays were at once visible, called forth frequent applause. Coins placed in a cigar case were plainly seen, and so were similar articles placed between two-inch thick deal boards, or in the middle of a thick book. Neither the wood nor the paper seemed to offer much resistance to the light. The proceedings were terminated by a hearty vote of thanks to the lecturer and demonstrator."

There are many references in the newspapers of the time of Sutton subsequently performing many demonstrations of these invisible rays using himself and other volunteers from his audiences. He later went on to also demonstrate the invisible rays of radium.

== Ships built by J. W. Sutton and Company ==
The following is a partial list of ships built by J. W. Sutton and Co. at Kangaroo Point. Information obtained from Lloyd's Register and other sources. See also "Steamers on the River" from Ipswitch to the sea. by William Torrance.

- 1880, Essex, iron steamship, 79 gross tons. Length: 91', beam 18'6", draft: 6'3". Built as an unpowered lighter until circa 1888 (engine added) and in 1895 the boiler was added. In April 1903, first registered by William Collin & Sons Ltd, Brisbane. She serviced Maryborough, Queensland.
- 1882, Iceberg, iron screw steamer, 285 tons and 127 feet long. She was 289 gross registered tons, a refrigerated cargo steamship.
- 1883, Pearl Steamer for the Sandgate and Woody Point Ferry. See: https://www.flotilla-australia.com/qldothers.htm
- 1883, Mavis, paddle wheel steamer, 47 tons gross measurement, the first steamer to run to Bribie Island. Utilized to convey timber from the Coochin Sawmills to Brisbane, taking back general cargo and supplies for residents in the Bribie district. Built for James Campbell and Sons sawmill.
- 1883, Redcliffe, Steamer for the Redcliffe and Sandgate Steam Ferry Company. Built June 1883.
- 1883, Eucalypta, Steamer for Gilbert Burnett, of Cleveland, For carrying timber for his sawmill. Dimensions:— Length, 75 feet; beam, 16 feet and depth of hold, 5 feet. She was propelled by a stern-wheel 11 feet in diameter, driven by a pair of engines of 16 horse-power, fitted with a surface condenser. From "The Telegraph" 18 Aug 1883.
- 1883, Transit, The first Steam Ferry for the Brisbane River, built for the Brisbane Steam Ferry Company and launched 22 September. From the Brisbane Courier same date: The new vessel is of punt shape, and is 50 ft. long, or 78 ft. over lips. The beam is 18 ft., or, over all sides, 29 ft; depth from dock to keel, 6 ft. 4in. The punt has a clear roadway for carriages 14 ft. wide and 50 ft. long.
- 1884, Atlas, Barge, Launched 20 January. Built for A.S. N. Company. Length overall 85 ft; breadth of beam, 35 ft depth of hold, 5 ft. She is built of iron, with pitch pine decks. Cargo up to 300 tons.
- 1884, Maid of Sker, iron paddle steamer with riveted iron hull, 52 tons gross, length: 74’8", beam: 17’, draft: 5’2", fitted with a steam engine capable of sixteen horsepower, twin cylinder condensing steam engine made in Birkenhead, England. The engine and boiler were mounted on deck. For propulsion a paddle wheel was used on each side, she had iron side wheels, a coal fired paddle steamer. She had a crew of 4, her skipper was Rudi Huth. Built for C.H. Philpott of the Nerang River to transport timber from Philpott's Mill to Brisbane. The Maid received her name from a popular novel of the times (published 1872) written by R.D. Blackmore, whose most famous work was Lorna Doone. The maid, in the novel, came from the Sker House in Wales.
- 1884, Lady Musgrave, iron steamship, 160 gross tons, 88 tons net. Length: 111'2", beam: 20'2", draft: 9'2". Built for William Collin's passenger/cargo trade from Brisbane, Maryborough and Bundaberg. Powered by a compounded engine that produced 45 horsepower. Captain William Collin's first purpose-built vessel. Collin built his fortune as a salvager and had previously owned used vessels. Launched 6 September. On 27 March 1904, Lady Musgrave was ship wrecked off Richmond River bar.
- 1884, Canaipa, iron stern wheel paddle steamer, built and owned by J. W. Sutton & Co. Powered by compound horizontal surface condensing engine of 60 hp. Ship registered at Brisbane. Designed for the Brisbane River – Moreton Bay service and the Brisbane – Southport trade.
- 1885, Undine, Launched 7 February. Iron Steamer modelled on the Thorneycroft torpedo boats. 60 feet long, her engines are compound surface condensing, cylinders 9in. and 18in. diameter respectively, 16 horse power nominal, 80 indicated. For personal use by J. W. Sutton. Ref "The Week" Sat 21 Mar 1885
- 1885, Curlew, Tug boat for the Harbours and Rivers Department. Launched 17 Aug 1885. The first of four to be called the Pelican, Seagull, and Hawk. The length is 70 ft.; beam, moulded, 16 ft.; depth of hold, 7 ft. The Curlew was fitted with compound surface condensing engines, 21-horsepower cylinders, 12in. and 24in, respectively. Brisbane Courier 17 Aug 1885.
- 1886, Hawk, The last of four tug boats for the Harbours and Rivers Department. 3 September. The dimensions of the boat are; length, 65 ft., width of beam, 16 ft, draft, 5 ft., speed, ten knots, fitted with compound surface condensing engines, 25 h.p.
- 1889, Tridacna, clamshell hopper. Tridacna is a clam found in the Indian and Pacific Oceans.
- Tinana, Collin steamer. steamer.
- Hopper dredge, name unknown, contracted to build during the First McIlwraith Ministry.
- Enterprise.
- 1897,Cleveland "The Capricornian" 18 May 1897. The suction dredge to the order of Messrs. Brand and Drybrough, of Townsville. The hull is of steel, 80 ft. long, 26 ft. abeam, and 3 ft. deep, with steel deck and both longitudinal and cross bulkheads, dividing the craft into a number of compartments, and giving great strength.

== Professional service ==
- Queensland Amateur Photographic Society, Vice President: 1884–1886, founding member. President: 1892.
- Queensland Photographic Society, Vice President: 1892.
- Queensland Philosophical Society, President: 1899.
- Royal Society of Queensland, President: 1899, member: 1877; Scientific interest: applied physical sciences. J. W. Sutton's presidential address of 1900 "For The People For Education For Science" is an important address outlining the advanced state of science in Brisbane at the turn of the century.
- Trustee of the Queensland Museum from 20 Nov 1899 till his resignation 10 Oct 1907 (as reported in the Brisbane Telegraph these dates).
- Queensland Acclimatisation Society, member.
- Exhibitor and later Judge at the Queensland Exhibition since 1875 (Brisbane Courier 12 July 1875).
- Served on the Central Bridge Committee 1888 (Kangaroo Point bridge).

== Patents ==
- Improvements in the wet process for the extraction of gold or silver or both from pulverized ores or from other finely-divided material, and in apparatus therefor. No. 3856.
- Improvements in the separation of gold from its chloride solution. No. 4152.
- Improvements in the chlorination of pulverized ores containing gold or silver, and in apparatus therefor. No. 4543.
- Rotary apparatus for generation of chlorin gas, &c. U.S. Patent No. 527,899.

"Joseph William Sutton, a subject of the Queen of Great Britain, and a resident of Ohelmer, in the county of Stanley and Colony of Queensland, have invented a certain new and useful improved rotary apparatus to be used in the generation of chlorin gas and its application to the chlorination of finely divided auriferous material and silver ores…" – J.W. Sutton, U.S. Patent No. 527,899.

- Improvements in recovery of gold precipitated from its chloride solution by sulphate of iron. No. 5625.
- Pneumatic cushion-spring for wheeled vehicles. U.S. Patent No. 1,048,371.
