= Dunaverty, Albion =

Dunaverty
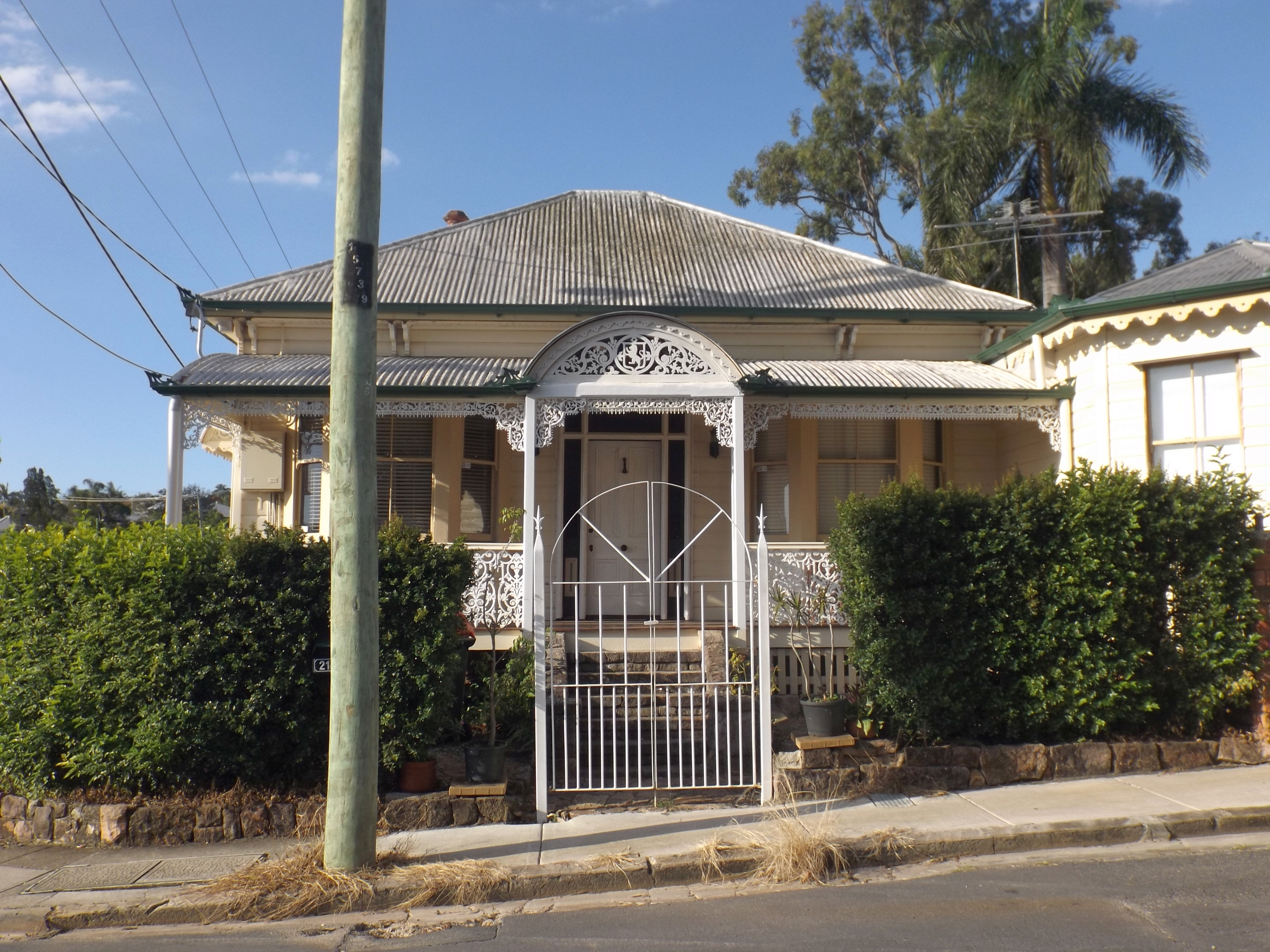
- Residence in 2015

- Location within Queensland Location within Australia
- 27.4282°S 153.0421°E
- Location: 21 Birkbeck Street, Albion, City of Brisbane, Queensland, Australia

History
- Design period: 1870s - 1890s (late 19th century)
- Built: 1887

Queensland Heritage Register
- Official name: Dunaverty, Carvarmore
- Type: state heritage (built)
- Designated: 21 October 1992
- Reference no.: 600045
- Significant period: 1880s-1890s (fabric & historical)
- Significant components: lead light/s, residential accommodation - main house
- Builders: Archibald McNish Fraser

Dunaverty is a heritage-listed detached house at 21 Birkbeck Street, Albion, City of Brisbane, Queensland, Australia. It was built in 1887 by Archibald McNish Fraser. It is also known as Carvarmore. It was added to the Queensland Heritage Register on 21 October 1992.

== History ==
Dunaverty was built in 1887 by builder and real estate entrepreneur Archibald McNish Fraser.

Fraser arrived in Brisbane from Argylshire in Scotland in 1880, aged 22, having completed his building apprenticeship, but with little money. He began his career in Brisbane working as a building contractor in Brisbane and Cleveland. Fraser built up his business, and by the mid-1880s had begun to move into real estate. Within two years of his arrival, he married Jemima Barclay, and in 1885 he purchased the Dunaverty site from his father-in-law, ganger John Barclay. He formally launched his own real estate business called the Onward Real Property Mart in 1887, the same year that Dunaverty was completed. By 1888 he had been made a Justice of the Peace.

In 1888 Fraser was praised as exemplifying a breed of young Brisbane entrepreneurs who had risen to affluence from modest beginnings, saying: "...It is with pride the city looks upon the prosperity of many such young men...".

Fraser personalised Dunaverty with the decorative detailing. Much of the glass and timberwork incorporates Scottish thistle motifs. The fanlights over the four doors to the front of the house incorporate the nicknames of three of his five children (two were born whilst the Frasers lived at Dunaverty) and his wife: Nellie, Charlie, Mima, and Katie (Ellen, Charles, Jemima and Christina). The house may have been built to showcase Fraser's business.

The Fraser family moved out of Dunaverty during the recession in the early 1890s to Exeter St, West End. The family lived in a number of residences in South Brisbane and Highgate Hill in the following years. Dunaverty remained the property of the Frasers until 1912. Archibald McNish Fraser died in 1918.

After the Fraser family moved out of Dunaverty, the house had new tenants almost every year. A tenant in 1895 was John Thomas Clough, also a Scot, from Glasgow, the manager of the Queensland Woollen Company, with his wife and children, while waiting for the completion of construction of a new house in Norman Parade, Eagle Junction. During their tenancy, in documents, the Cloughs temporarily called Fraser's house, "Raven Rock"

, after RavenRock,, now the location of a stilted lighthouse, on Loch Long from the Firth of Clyde. The new house of the Cloughs in Eagle Junction received this name too, upon completion and until it was sold by the Clough family after 1929.

In 1912 Dunaverty was bought by William McGregor, when it was renamed "Carvarmore". Again it was not occupied by its owners until it was sold again in 1925. The south-east verandah may have been added around this time. Prior to 1998, a previous owner added a polygonal room to the southern corner, and bathroom and laundry structures to the rear of the house. Dunaverty changed hands several times but continued to be used as a rental property until 1998 when it became owner-occupied again.

The house remains intact as a boom-era residence with personalised detailing. However, during 1998 the house was vacant, and some of the cedar joinery and ironmongery was stolen.

== Description ==
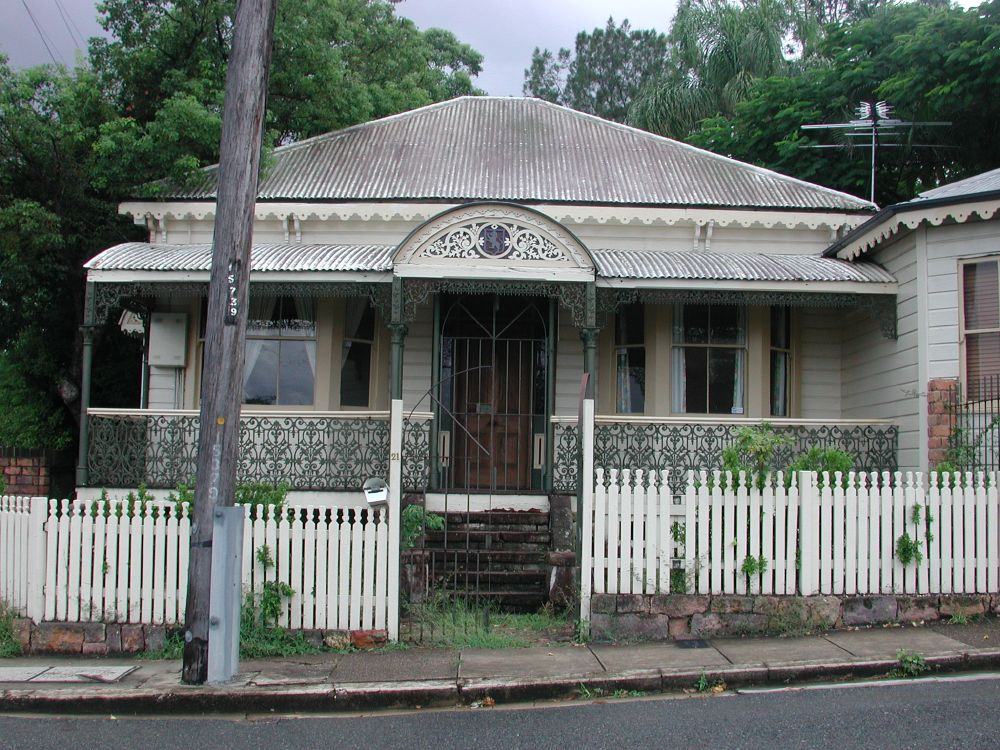
Dunaverty, 2006

Located on the corner of Birkbeck and Hudson Rd, Dunaverty is a picturesque chamferboard cottage with a hipped corrugated iron roof. In its corner position and with its rich external detailing, the residence is prominent in a street of modest cottages along Birkbeck St, and makes a picturesque contribution to the streetscape.

The house is L-shaped in plan, with a wing extending out to the north east. It has a front verandah overlooking Birkbeck St to the south-west, a side verandah along the south eastern frontage, and an enclosed verandah in the northern corner. The building has a hipped roof, with gently curved verandah awnings.

The front elevation presents a richly decorated face to the street framed by mature palms. The verandah has cast iron posts with floriated capitals, and richly detailed cast iron valances and balustrade panels. The main entrance has a projecting barrel vault supported on paired posts, which has a finely carved fretwork panel with thistle motifs and a unicorn in a crest. The end panels of the verandah thistle motifs encircling a lion in a crest. The main roof has a scalloped timber trim and carved double eaves brackets. The front entrance has coloured glass surrounds with etched thistle motifs, and is flanked by projecting bay windows.

The north-west elevation facing Hudson Rd has sash windows protected by hoods on shaped timber brackets with fretwork panels which also incorporate the thistle motif. The rear verandah is enclosed with vertical timber louvres, but the fretwork end panels remain visible. Timber French doors and casement windows open onto the verandah to the south-east. Two richly detailed brick chimneys surmounted by barley-twisted terracotta chimney pots are visible from the rear of the house.

The house has three bedrooms and a rear kitchen along the south-western side; a central entrance hall, and a joined living and dining room to the north-east. The interior contains fine decorative detailing. It has cedar joinery throughout. The fanlights above the four doors to the front of the house are made of fretwork panels which incorporate the thistle motifs, and nicknames of Fraser's family: Nellie, Charlie, Mima, and Katie. The house has timber ceiling roses throughout which also incorporate thistle patterns, as do the coloured glass panels to the hall door (no longer extant). Much of the ironmongery in the house, particularly the door hinges and some escutcheons are decorated with floral patterns.

Dunaverty is an intact "boom era" middle class residence with fine idiosyncratic detailing which makes a picturesque contribution to Birkbeck St.

== Heritage listing ==
Dunaverty was listed on the Queensland Heritage Register on 21 October 1992 having satisfied the following criteria.

The place is important in demonstrating the evolution or pattern of Queensland's history.

It has a strong association with one of Brisbane's 1880s immigrant entrepreneurs, Archibald McNish Fraser. The house is a fine and intact example of a "boom era" 1880s timber residence which contains fine personalised detailing and which makes a picturesque contribution to the Birkbeck St and Hudson Rd streetscape.

The place is important in demonstrating the principal characteristics of a particular class of cultural places.

The house is a fine and intact example of a "boom era" 1880s timber residence which contains fine personalised detailing and which makes a picturesque contribution to the Birkbeck St and Hudson Rd streetscape.

The place is important because of its aesthetic significance.

The house is a fine and intact example of a "boom era" 1880s timber residence which contains fine personalised detailing and which makes a picturesque contribution to the Birkbeck St and Hudson Rd streetscape.

The place has a special association with the life or work of a particular person, group or organisation of importance in Queensland's history.

It has a strong association with one of Brisbane's 1880s immigrant entrepreneurs, Archibald McNish Fraser.
