= Breakfast Creek Hotel =

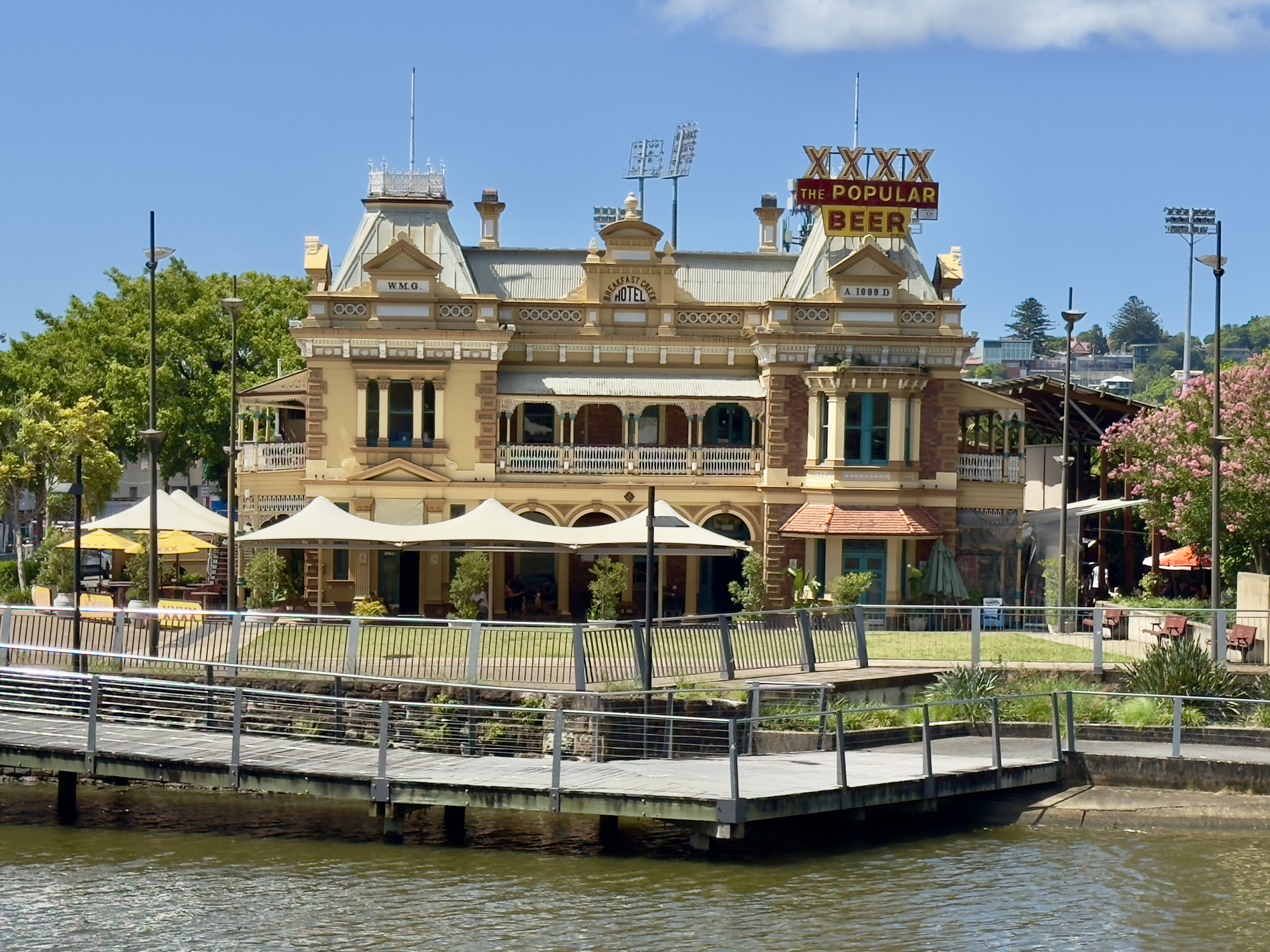
- Breakfast Creek Hotel in 2025, the lights of Allan Border Field in the background

- Location within Queensland
- 27.4408°S 153.0455°E
- Location: 2 Kingsford Smith Drive, Albion, City of Brisbane, Queensland, Australia

History
- Design period: 1870s–1890s (late 19th century)
- Built: 1889–1890

Site notes
- Architect: Simkin & Ibler
- Architectural style: Victorian Filigree

Queensland Heritage Register
- Official name: Breakfast Creek Hotel
- Type: state heritage (built)
- Designated: 21 October 1992
- Reference no.: 600057
- Significant period: 1889, c. 1900, 1926, 1930 (fabric)
- Significant components: bar, kitchen/kitchen house
- Builders: Thomas Woollam & William Norman

Breakfast Creek Hotel is a heritage-listed hotel at 2 Kingsford Smith Drive, Albion, City of Brisbane, Queensland, Australia. It was designed by Simkin & Ibler and built in 1889 to 1890 by Thomas Woollam & William Norman. It was added to the Queensland Heritage Register on 21 October 1992.

Standing completely detached in its own grounds, it was designed in the French Renaissance architecture style. The centre portion is recessed with a loggia of four arches, paved with Encaustic tiles. On the left wing, the bar entrance has a pediment flanked by Doric pilasters. The right wing contained the commercial and drawing-rooms and was finished with a two-storied bay-window. A massive cornice, with parapets and pediments, covers the front, left and right sides of the building. On the roof, each wing is capped with a pavilion having bevelled-corners and crowned with an ornamental iron cresting and tall flag-poles. Externally the walls are tuck-pointed with rusticated quoins at the angles.

William McNaughton Galloway's initials and the date appear on the front facade of the hotel.

== History ==
This large, two-storeyed brick hotel was constructed in 1889 for William MacNaughton Galloway, an Edward Street seaman's outfitter who served as president of the Breakfast Creek Bridge Board from 1887 to 1889, and as Mayor of Brisbane from 1889 to 1890.

The site initially was part of a larger subdivision of 9 acres (3.6 ha) which was alienated in 1845 and acquired by Thomas Hennessy, carpenter, of Brisbane, in 1849. By 1862, and probably much earlier, Mrs Hennessy had established a Breakfast Creek Hotel on part of this property. Whether this was on the site of the 1890 building is not clear. A traffic bridge across Breakfast Creek was established as early as 1848, and the early hotel was located in its vicinity. Publican Michael Campbell took over the Breakfast Creek Hotel in 1863, but the business does not appear to have survived to the late 1860s.

Galloway's hotel was erected during a period of growth in the Breakfast Creek area associated with quarrying, timber-milling, the construction of the Albion racecourse, and the opening of the new Breakfast Creek Bridge on 24 May 1889.

Tenders were called in April 1889 by architects George S Simkin and John Ibler, and the foundation stone was laid on 18 May 1889. The successful contractors were Thomas Woollam and William Norman with a price of £5,300.

Described as a family hotel, the Breakfast Creek Hotel opened on 17 May 1890. At the time, the building occupied a commanding position at the northern end of the new Breakfast Creek Bridge, visible from the city, Albion and Hamilton approaches. The interiors were considered very fine, the fittings in the bar on the ground floor of the west wing being particularly impressive. Large folding doors between the east wing dining and commercial rooms on the ground floor, could be opened to create a large banqueting room. Above the staircase landing was a partition containing a stained glass medallion depicting Lady Macbeth, framed by two enamel-painted allegorical figures. There were ten bedrooms and a large drawing room on the first floor, all of which had extensive views of the Brisbane River, Breakfast Creek, and surrounding country. At the rear were the kitchen, servant's rooms and stables, the latter floored with hardwood blocks set in cement. With the ground being particularly damp, the whole of the subfloor was occupied by cellars, the walls and floors of which were constructed of concrete, and in effect forming the foundations.

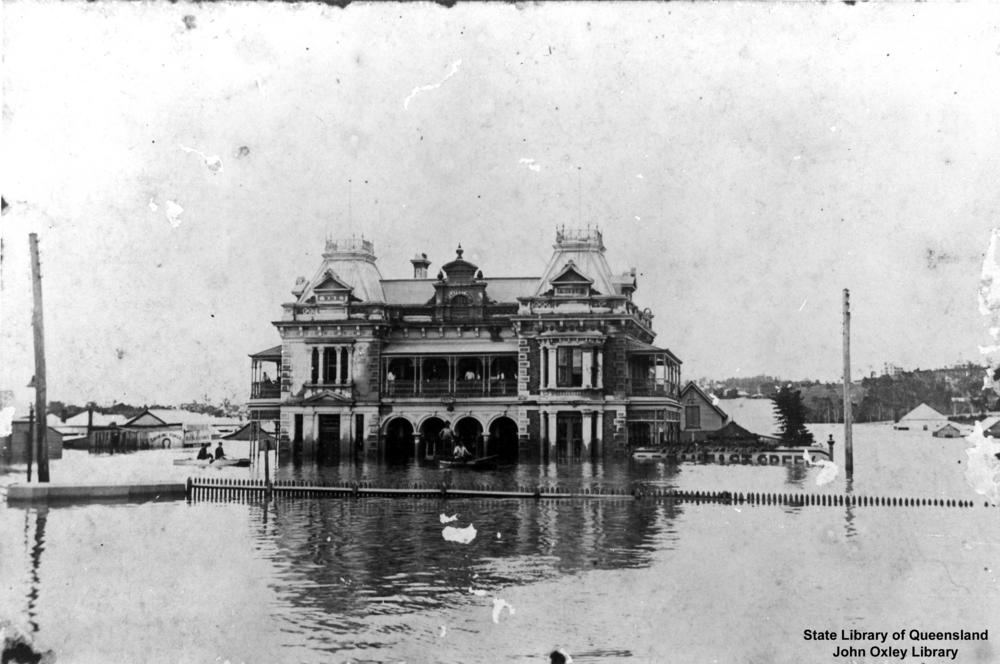
The Breakfast Creek Hotel during the 1893 flood

In February 1893, the Brisbane River flooded and the hotel was 7 to 8 feet (2.1 to 2.4 m) underwater. The upper floors were used by many people as a refuge, accessed by climbing up the iron posts that supported the verandahs.

On Saturday 12 January 1895, Galloway fell from a window on the second floor of the hotel, a distance of 17 feet (5.2 m). He received immediate medical attention from a passing doctor and was taken to hospital, but he died about 40 minutes later. In the subsequent magisterial inquiry, it was revealed that Galloway had been drinking heavily over the previous 3 weeks. On the day of his death, he was again intoxicated and the barman, William Floyd, decided to lock Galloway in an upper room of the hotel, hoping Galloway would sleep off his intoxication. Galloway attempted to escape the room by climbing out the window. Having climbed out the window onto a ledge, he tried to jump to a nearby balcony. Although he caught the balcony railings with his hands, one hand gave way and he fell.

Anne Galloway (née Waters), the widow of William Galloway, took over the license of the hotel in April 1895. However, as William Galloway died intestate with a mortgage over the hotel with the Queensland National Bank, the Curator of Intestate Estates became the owner of the property and leased the hotel to Mrs Galloway for six years from August 1895.

In January 1898, the Brisbane River flooded again and the hotel was surrounded by water.

In September 1900, the hotel was sold (subject to the lease to Mrs Galloway) to the brewing company Perkins & Co. In August 1901, Anne Galloway's lease of the hotel ended and she was not able to obtain a new lease from Perkins & Co. Her response was described as having:

"seemed to lose her head, wrecking the premises, and pulling down the bar, electric bells, a kitchen range, a copper boiler, and caused the stables to be removed".

She refused to give Perkins & Co the possession of the premises by nailing up all the doors of the hotel. It was only when Perkins & Co blocked access to the cellar, through which she was entering and exiting the hotel, that she capitulated and the license was transferred to Michael McGuire. A subsequent long court case followed where the ownership of various fixtures and fittings of the hotel was contested between Perkins & Co and Mrs Galloway. Mrs Galloway moved to Southport.

The two-storeyed eastern wing at the rear dates from around the turn of the century, and may have been erected following the transfer to Perkins.

Publican Michael John McGuire held the lease from 1901 to 1917, and since 1926, the lease and license of the Breakfast Creek Hotel have been held principally by members of the Cavill family. In 1926, Brisbane architect Richard Gailey called tenders for alterations and additions to the hotel, and a cold room was constructed in 1930.

The Breakfast Creek Hotel has become a Brisbane landmark, and remains the only hotel in Brisbane which still offers beer "off the wood". Its 20th century clientele have included an assorted mix of waterside workers, fishermen, railway workers, policemen, journalists, lawyers, bookies, petty criminals and politicians.

In February 2022, the Breakfast Creek Hotel experienced significant flooding—only the fourth such event in its long history—when torrential rains inundated the Brisbane area, causing widespread damage to homes and businesses across southeast Queensland.

In response to the disaster, the hotel hosted a flood appeal benefit to support affected communities.

== Description ==
The Breakfast Creek Hotel is an ornate two-storeyed rendered masonry building with cement dressings and corrugated iron sheeted roofs. It comprises a main building with verandahs to the south, west and east (1889), and a brick service wing extending to the rear (early 1900s) with timber extensions (c. 1926). The building is prominently located at the junction of Breakfast Creek Road and Kingsford Smith Drive, and at the confluence of Breakfast Creek and the Brisbane River. Its rich external decoration and prominent crested mansard roofs at the corners, combined with its location, gives the building landmark status in the Breakfast Creek townscape.

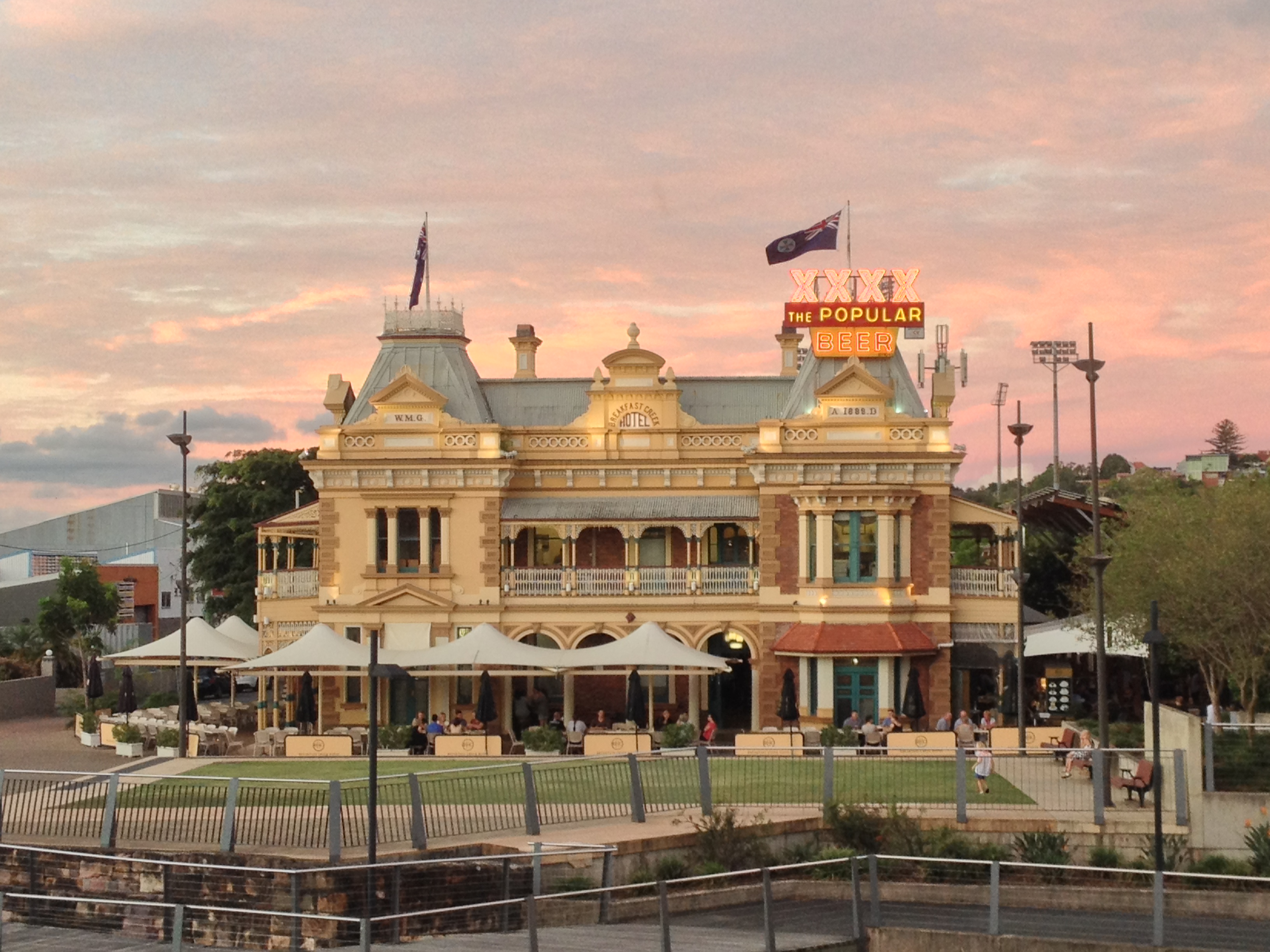
The Breakfast Creek Hotel at twilight

The 1889 building is extravagantly detailed. The Breakfast Creek Road frontage to the south has projecting end bays with vermiculated stone quoins which flank a ground floor loggia and first floor verandah. These bays have mansard roofs with crested widow's walks. The western bay has a doorway framed by pilasters and a pediment, with windows framed with pilasters above. The eastern bay has a two-storey height faceted bay window. The loggia has round columns and cement extrados.

The building is encircled with a deep cornice with scrolled brackets and dentils, surmounted by a parapet with circular motifs. The parapet supports five pediments. The central pediment has an arched panel inscribed with the words "Breakfast Creek Hotel", which is topped with an arched gable which is embellished with acroteria. The central pediment is flanked by two triangular pediments with scrolls inscribed with the words W.M.G (Galloway's initials) and AD 1889 (the year of construction). The east and western elevations also have triangular pediments.

The verandahs around the building have intricately detailed cast iron balustrades, and columns with valances. The columns are paired, and have floriated capitals, hexagonal bases, and fluted shafts. The verandah to the west is supported on cast iron columns with cast iron valances and spandrel panels.

The 1889 building has two large bars on the ground floor either side of an entrance hall and offices and meeting rooms upstairs, and contains some rich internal decoration. The entrance hall has a decorated arch with a female figure on the keystone, a terrazzo floor with the letters "BCH" (abbreviation of Breakfast Creek Hotel) inlaid at the door, cedar stairs with richly turned balusters and newels at the northern end, and four timber framed doors with etched glass with floral motifs leading to the bars. The western bar has a terrazzo floor, and is decorated with black-and-white polished ceramic tiles, and etched glass and coloured glass windows with floral motifs. The eastern bar has coloured glass windows over mirrors along its eastern wall, and a bay window with etched and coloured glass.

The stairs to the upper floor also give access to the service wing at half-landing level. The doorway has coloured glass surrounds with painted allegorical figures and geometrically patterned coloured glass panels. There is a pressed metal ceiling above these stairs.

The upper floor of the 1889 building contains large meeting rooms and smaller offices either side of a small east–west corridor and a wider north–south corridor; both have central decorative arches. There is a large room in the south-east corner which has a fireplace with marble surrounds, and another in the south west corner which has a decorative plaster ceiling and full-length sash windows.

The rear service wing, containing the kitchen and service areas, is brick with cement dressings, and has a brick-on-edge string course at first floor level. It has a hipped corrugated iron roof with decorative timber eaves brackets. This service wing has been extended at ground floor level to the east, with a single-storeyed timber pavilion with a pitched roof containing a dining room.

The dining room opens to the outside with large timber folding doors on two walls. It is lined with coloured polished ceramic tiles and has a plaster ceiling with a rounded stepped cornice, and pilasters with staggered flat capitals with rounded ends.

== Heritage listing ==
Breakfast Creek Hotel was listed on the Queensland Heritage Register on 21 October 1992 having satisfied the following criteria.

The place is important in demonstrating the evolution or pattern of Queensland's history.

The Breakfast Creek Hotel is closely associated with the development of the Breakfast Creek area in the late 19th century, and with prominent Brisbane personality WM Galloway.

The place demonstrates rare, uncommon or endangered aspects of Queensland's cultural heritage.

It is a fine example of late 1880s boom-era commercial architecture in Brisbane, and one of few known works by Brisbane architects Simkin & Ibler.

The place is important in demonstrating the principal characteristics of a particular class of cultural places.

It is a fine example of late 1880s boom-era commercial architecture in Brisbane, and one of few known works by Brisbane architects Simkin & Ibler.

The place is important because of its aesthetic significance.

The Breakfast Creek Hotel is an ornate, richly detailed building which assumes landmark status in the Breakfast Creek townscape. It contains some rich internal detailing, including cedar stairs, coloured and etched glass, decorative mouldings, and coloured tiles. The Breakfast Creek Hotel survives as an integral element in a grouping of culturally significant places at the junction of Breakfast Creek and the Brisbane River, including Newstead House (1846) and Park, the Temple of the Holy Triad (1886) and Breakfast Creek Bridge (1889).

The place has a strong or special association with a particular community or cultural group for social, cultural or spiritual reasons.

It is one of the best-known hotels in Brisbane, and in the 20th century has been associated with working-class and labor party groups from waterside workers to politicians.

The place has a special association with the life or work of a particular person, group or organisation of importance in Queensland's history.

The Breakfast Creek Hotel is closely associated with the development of the Breakfast Creek area in the late 19th century, and with prominent Brisbane personality WM Galloway.

== Awards ==
In 2009, as part of the Q150 celebrations, the Breakfast Creek Hotel was announced as one of the Q150 Icons of Queensland for its role as a "location".

== In popular culture ==
The hotel is regarded as a Brisbane icon and is mentioned in many books about Brisbane. It was mentioned in the 1987 song "Dreamworld" by Midnight Oil.

== See also ==
- List of public houses in Australia
