= William McNaughton Galloway =

Australian politician

William Galloway
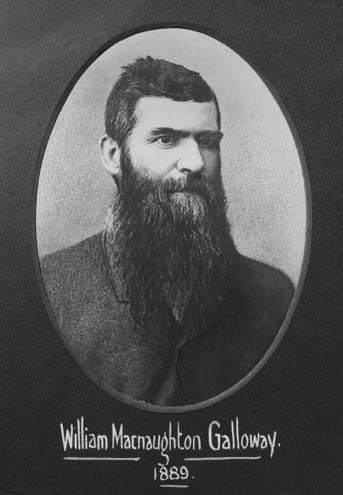
- William McNaughton Galloway - 1889

22nd Mayor of Brisbane
- In office 1889–1889
- Preceded by: Richard Southall
- Succeeded by: John McMaster

Personal details
- Born: William McNaughton Galloway; 1840 Perth, Scotland
- Died: 12 January 1895 (aged 54 or 55) Brisbane, Queensland, Australia
- Resting place: Toowong Cemetery
- Spouse: Anne Waters (d.1924)
- Occupation: Publican

William McNaughton Galloway (1840 – 12 January 1895) was mayor of Brisbane, Queensland, Australia in 1889. He also built the now heritage-listed Breakfast Creek Hotel.

== Personal life ==
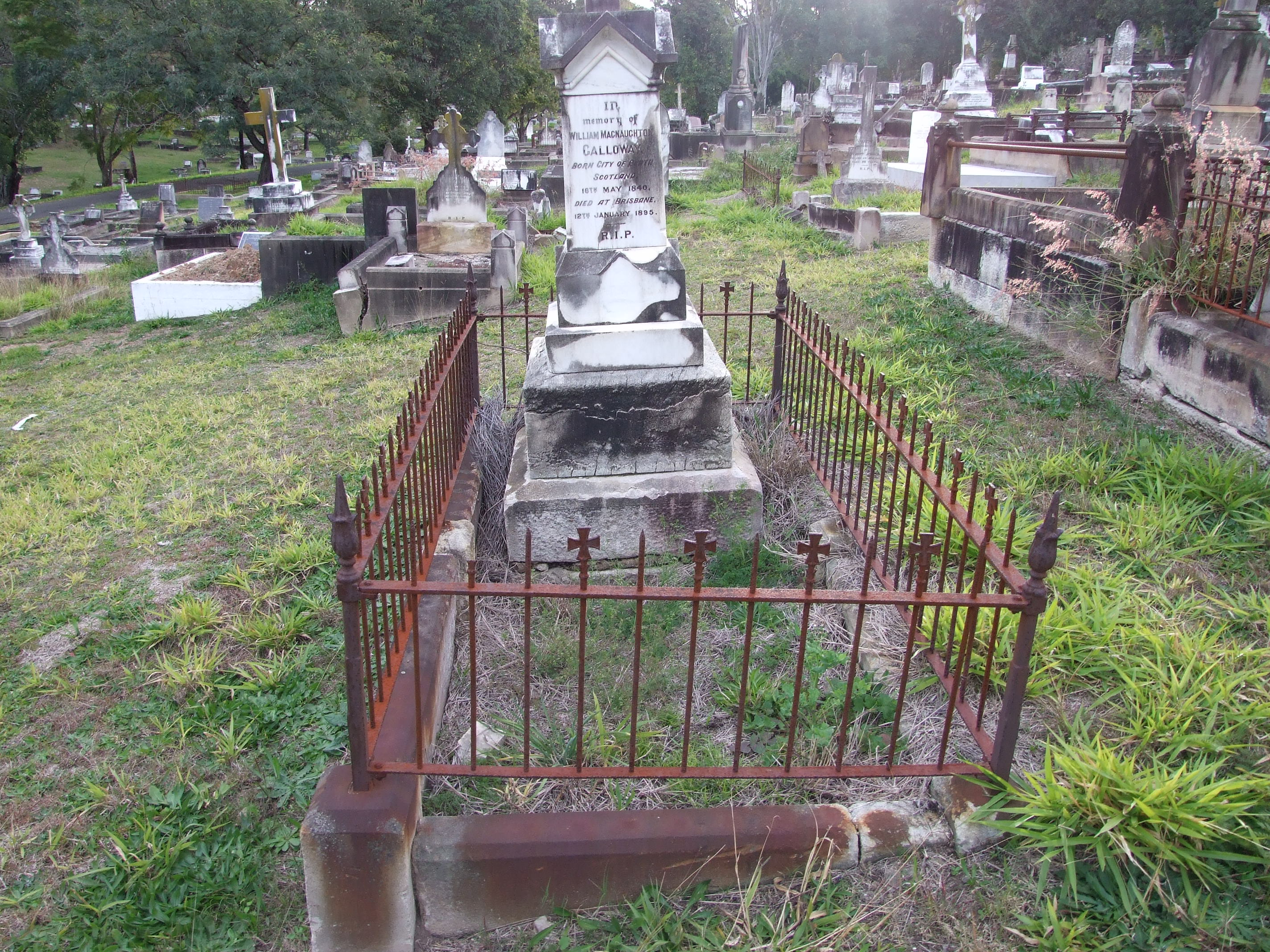
The grave of William Galloway at Toowong Cemetery

William Galloway was born in Perth, Scotland in 1840, the son of George Galloway and Hellen née Martin.

He married wife Anne (née Waters). They lived in the house "Dovecotland" at Kelvin Grove until 1890 when they moved into the Breakfast Creek Hotel which they built in 1889.

On Saturday 12 January 1895, William McNaughton Galloway fell from a window on the second floor of the Breakfast Creek Hotel, a distance of 17 feet. He received immediate medical attention from a passing doctor and was taken to hospital, but he died about 40 minutes later. In the subsequent magisterial inquiry, it was revealed that Galloway had been drinking heavily over the previous 3 weeks. On the day of his death, he was again intoxicated and the barman, William Floyd, decided to lock Galloway in an upper room of the hotel, hoping Galloway would sleep off his intoxication. Galloway attempted to escape the room by climbing out the window. Having climbed out the window onto a ledge, he tried to jump to a nearby balcony. Although he caught the balcony railings with his hands, one hand gave way and he fell.

Galloway was buried in Toowong Cemetery the following day, 13 January 1895. He was survived by his wife Anne.

== Business life ==
William Galloway operated a ship's chandler business at 89 Edward Street, Brisbane.

From 1890 to his death in 1895, William Galloway was the publican of the Breakfast Creek Hotel.

== Public life ==
Galloway was an alderman of the Brisbane Municipal Council from 1884 to 1891. He was mayor in 1889. He served on the following committees:

- Finance Committee 1884, 1886, 1890
- Works Committee 1885, 1887, 1889, 1891
- Legislative Committee 1885, 1889
- Town Hall Committee 1885–1887
- Health Committee 1887, 1889–1891
- Street Lighting Committee 1891

In the Brisbane Municipal Council elections of 7 February 1888, Galloway was declared to have lost the election for the East Ward by 5 votes. Voting at that time was done by crossing out the names of the undesired candidates. Galloway claimed that a number of votes were ruled informal by the returning officer because the voter had crossed out a part of his name but had crossed out all of the name of his opponent Robert Porter; Galloway argued that these votes should have been counted as votes for him. The matter was adjudicated in the Supreme Court of Queensland on 15 February 1888 where the a panel of three judges decided that these disputed votes should be counted as votes for Galloway, thus electing him in the East Ward.

Galloway was a well-known union identity. He was a secretary of the Seamen's Union. He was the first President of the Brisbane Trades and Labour Council, established in 1885. In 1888, Galloway was the first person to contest an election as a member of the Australian labour movement when he unsuccessfully contested the 1888 by-election in the electoral district of Fortitude Valley.

Galloway was an officer for some years in the Queensland United Licensed Victuallers' Association.

== See also ==
- List of mayors and lord mayors of Brisbane
