= Albion, Queensland =

Albion
- Suburb
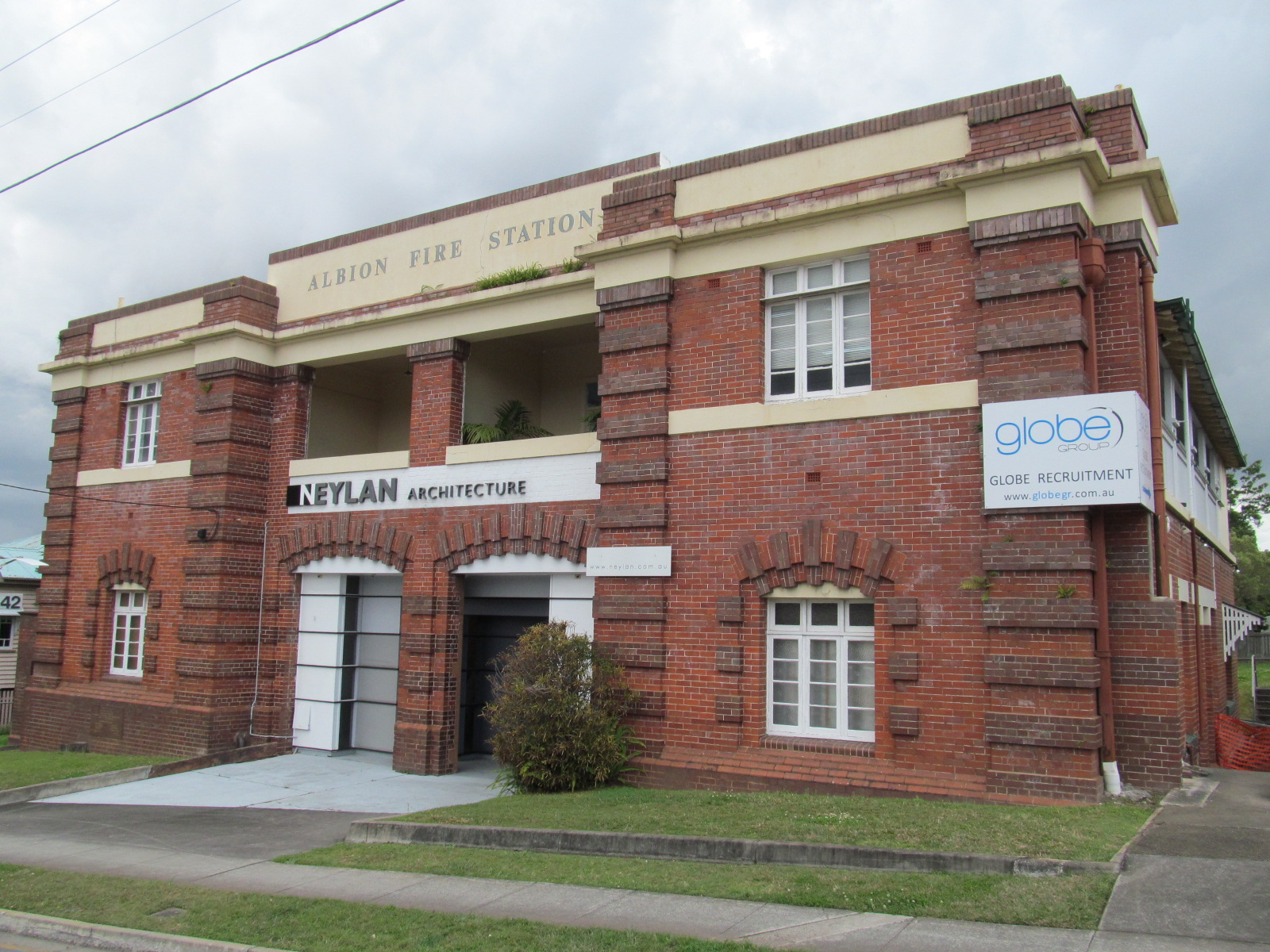
- Former Albion Fire Station, 2013

- Interactive map of Albion
- Coordinates: 27.4336°S 153.0441°E
- Country: Australia
- State: Queensland
- City: Brisbane
- LGA: City of Brisbane (Hamilton Ward)
- Location: 5.1 km (3.2 mi) NNE of Brisbane CBD

Government
  - State electorate: Clayfield
  - Federal division: Brisbane

Area
  - Total: 1.4 km^{2} (0.54 sq mi)
- Elevation: 20 m (66 ft)

Population
  - Total: 3,446 (2021 census)
  - Density: 2,460/km^{2} (6,380/sq mi)
- Time zone: UTC+10:00 (AEST)
- Postcode: 4010
Suburbs around Albion
Lutwyche	Wooloowin	Clayfield
Windsor	Albion	Ascot
Bowen Hills	Newstead	Hamilton

Albion is an inner north-eastern suburb in the City of Brisbane, Queensland, Australia. In the 2021 census, Albion had a population of 3,446 people.

== Geography ==
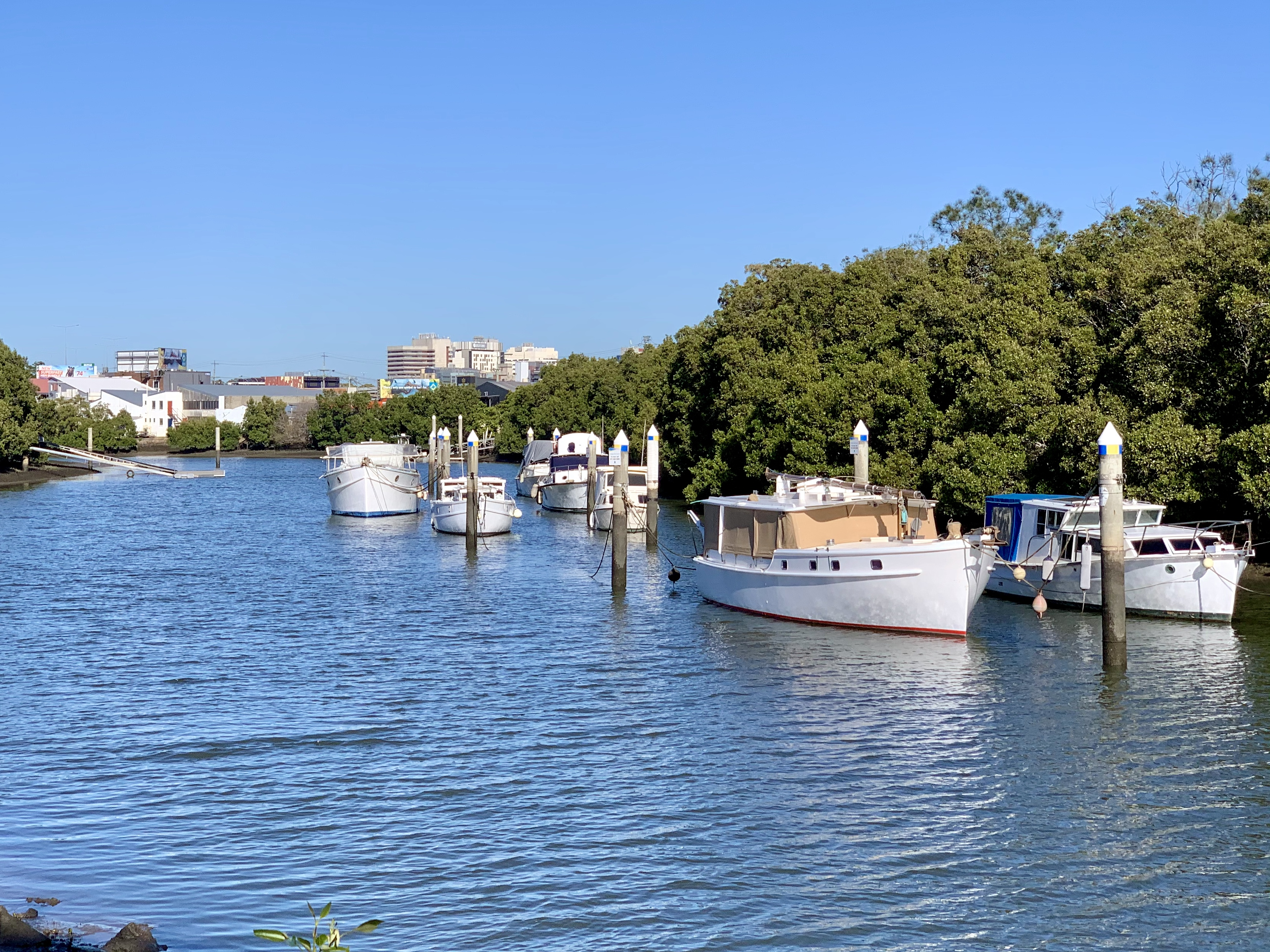
Breakfast Creek at Albion, 2020

Albion is bounded by Wooloowin in the north, Ascot in the east, Newstead in the south, and Windsor to the west, with Breakfast Creek defining the suburb border in its south and south-west. Sandgate Road, a major road on the north side of Brisbane, runs through the middle of the suburb. A variety of housing styles, from former workers' cottages through to modern brick homes and unit blocks, can be found in Albion.

Breakfast Creek is a neighbourhood within the west of the suburb (27.4388°S 153.0458°E).

== History ==
The name Breakfast Creek comes from Breakfast Point, which was a rocky point of the downstream side of the creek and was named by explorer John Oxley during his 1823 exploration of the Brisbane River.

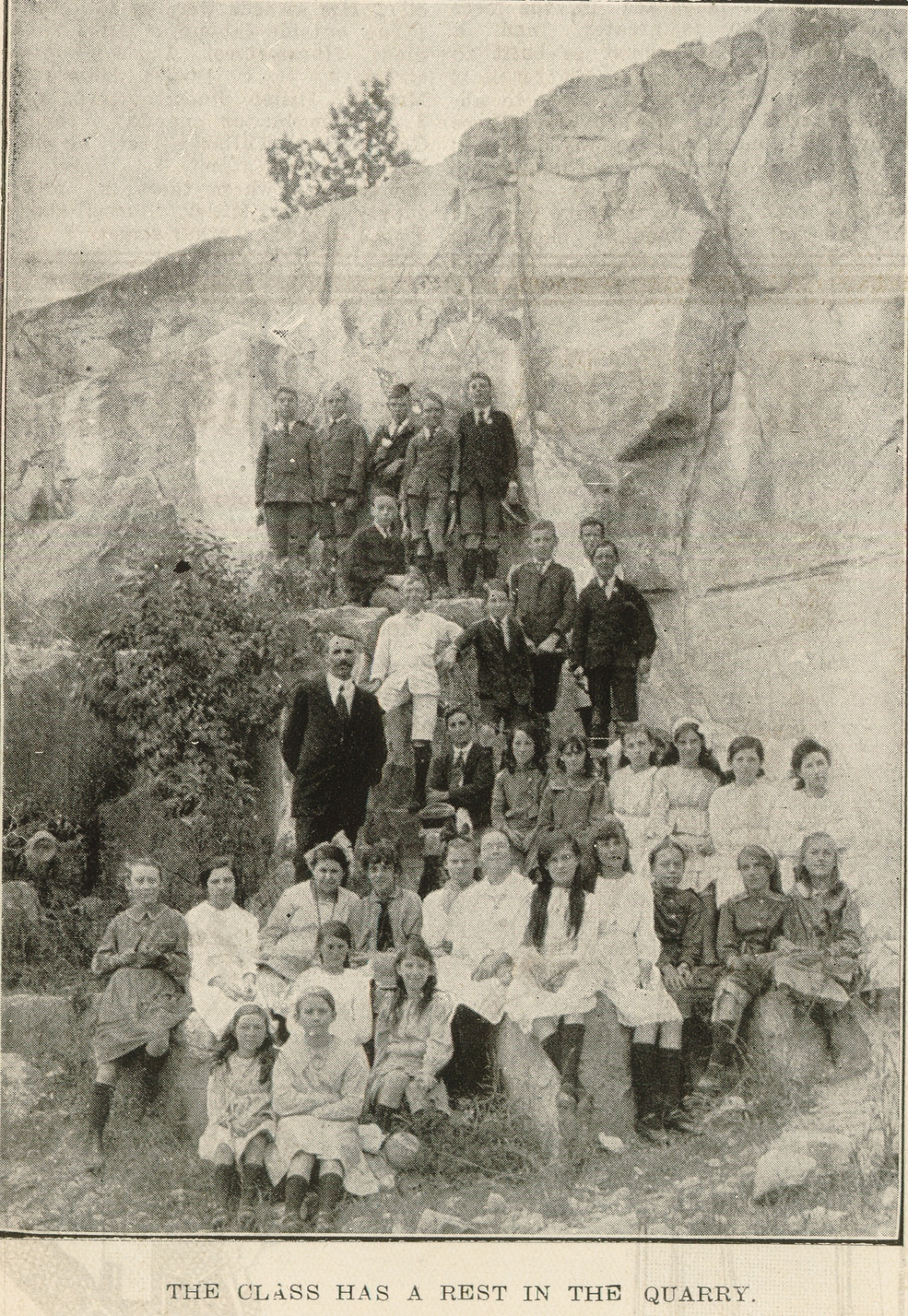
Students of East Brisbane State School having a geology lession at the Albion quarries, 1918

In 1860 John Petrie opened a quarry at Albion. It occupied a site that today would be in the vicinity of Comus Avenue, loosely bounded by Crosby Road to the south, Morgan Street to the east, Tower Street to the north, and Lapraik Street to the west (27.4318°S 153.0495°E).

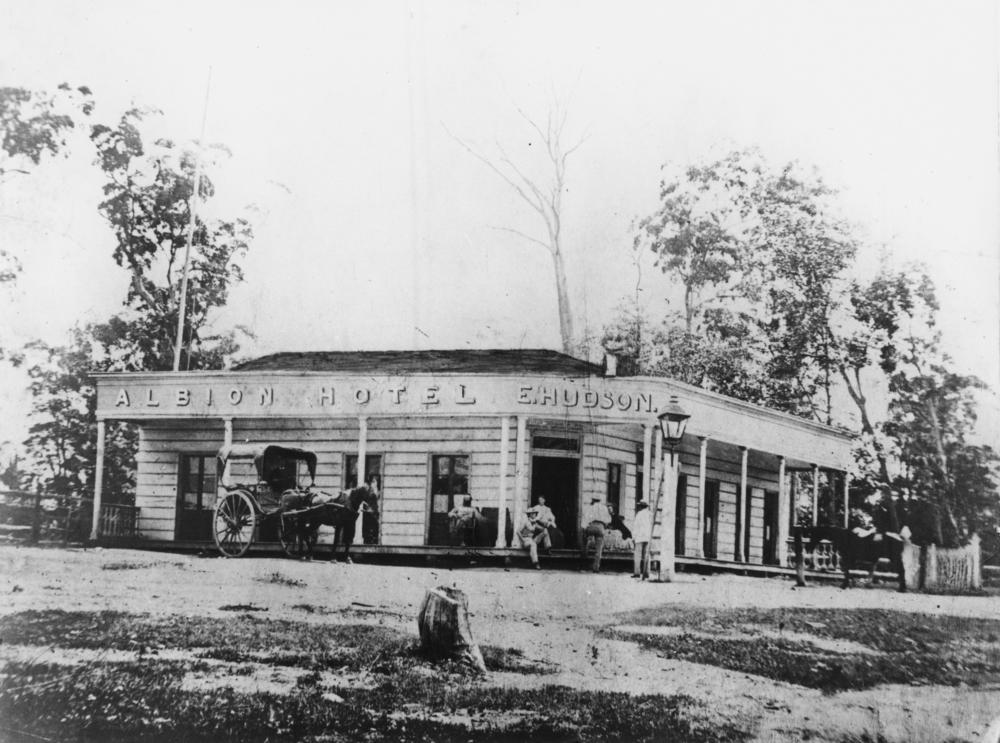
Albion Hotel, Brisbane, ca. 1866, from which the suburb of Albion takes its name

The name Albion comes from the Albion Hotel built by Thomas Hayseldon (also written as Hazeldon), which was so called because the white wall of Petrie's quarry reminded Hayseldon of the England's white cliffs (Albion being an old name for England, from the Latin albus meaning white). From 1866 to 1870, the proprietor was Edward Hudson. The low lying parts of Albion came into the limelight when a swampy area near the Breakfast Creek was designated as the racecourse. In 1885, it became the headquarters of the Smithfield Pony Club and later in 1895 of the Albion Park Racecourse. Many Chinese migrants settled here and the Temple of the Holy Triad was built on the Higgs Street for the local community in 1885-86.

On 17 May 1890 the Breakfast Creek Hotel opened. The French Renaissance style hotel has remained a prominent landmark to this day, despite going under water in floods in 1893, 1898, 1974, 2011 and 2022.

Breakfast Creek Sportsground was officially opened on Saturday 31 August 1899. Proprietors Michael Gannon and Andrew Lang Petrie drained a swamp to create a major recreational facilities, occupying 26 acres (11 ha) of a 30-acre (12 ha) site. The facilities included a racetrack, trotting track, bicycle track, fields for various sports such as cricket, football, tennis and lacrosse, a skating rink, and a lake for model boats. There were grandstands and a ballroom and concert hall with supper rooms and refreshment areas with 100 electric lights. There was a 435-foot (133 m) "switchback railway" (a roller-coaster) with four falls. The Sportsground is now the Albion Park Paceway.

Breakfast Creek State School opened on 7 July 1890 and closed on 11 August 1961. It was on the western side of Agnew Street (27.4404°S 153.0468°E). Following the closure of the school, the Fortitude Valley Opportunity School relocated into the buildings, becoming Newstead Opportunity School. Later it was renamed Newstead Special School (27.4404°S 153.0469°E). It closed in 1996.

On 27 September 1880, eight blocks of land of "Corunna Estate" were advertised for auction by John Cameron.

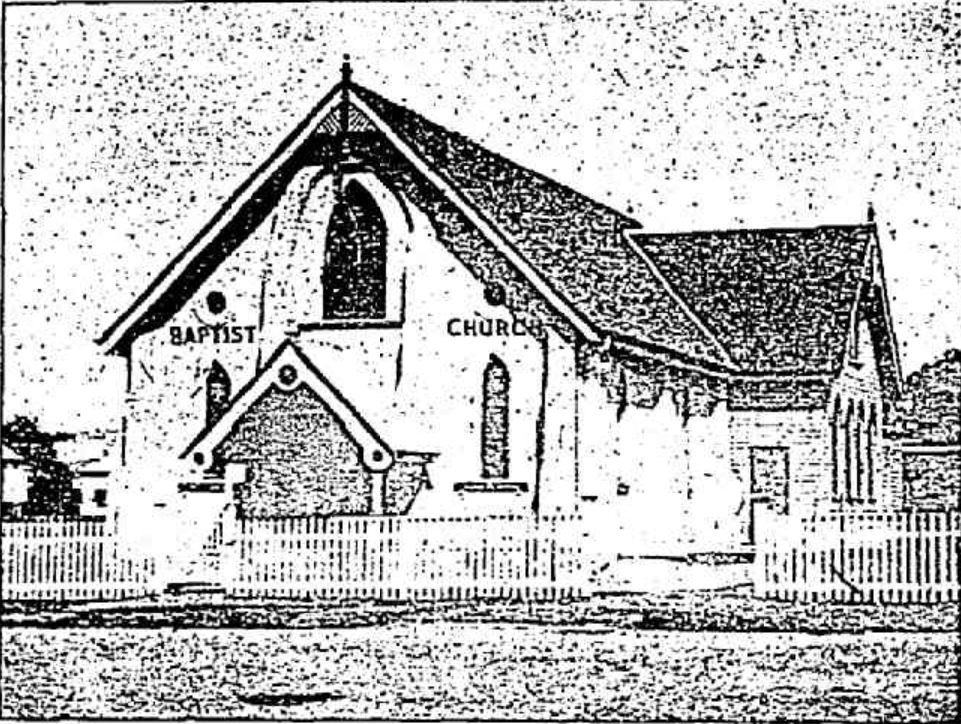
Albion Baptist Church, 1907

In 1883, a Baptist church opened in Albion.

In December 1884, "Albion Township Estate" made up of ninety-one allotments of land were advertised to be auctioned by Arthur Martin & Co., Auctioneers. A map advertising the auction shows the proximity of the estate to Breakfast Creek.

On 28 October 1899, sixty allotments of land of Albion Hill estate, being re-subdivisions 1 to 60, of subdivision of section 3 of portion 162, Parish of Enoggera, were advertised for auction by Isles, Love & Co. The advertising map states the estate's proximity to Albion Train Station, with 76 trains daily. The land for sale was situated between Camden St, Albion, and Ford St and Old Sandgate Rd (now Bonney Ave), Clayfield.

A first meeting of the Church of Christ took place on 1 January 1911 at the Good Templar's hall in Stoneleigh Street involving members of the Ann Street congregation. On 6 January 1912 a separate congregation was formed in Albion. Land for a church was bought at 86 McLennan Street in 1913 and the church was opened in 1915. In 1929, the Albion congregation helped to establish a new congregation in Kedron. In 1992, the Albion and Kedron congregations merged to form the Brisbane North congregation and the Albion church was sold in 1997.

On 5 December 1926, Roman Catholic Archbishop James Duhig laid the foundation stone for St Columban's College at "Highlands" at 451 Sandgate Road (27.4282°S 153.0463°E). The school officially opened on Sunday 29 January 1928 as a school for boys operated by the Christian Brothers. In 1985 the Christian Brothers passed the management of the college to the Brisbane Diocese. This triggered a number of changes, a phasing out the primary school to focus on secondary schooling. In 1996 the school accepted enrolments from girls and in 1997 the school relocated to Caboolture. The Albion site has been redeveloped as The Clayfield retirement village but three heritage buildings have been retained on the site: Highlands, O'Driscoll Hall and Whytecliffe.

On 25 February 1929, a plan was drawn up for the Frank Mann Estate, Subdivisions 1 to 4 of Resubdivision 1 and Subdivision 1 of Resubdivision 1 of Subdivision A of Resubdivision 2 of Subdivisions 51 to 54 of Portion 149, Parish of Enoggera, County of Stanley.

In 2013, the A$29m state-of-the-art Bupa National Cricket Centre was completed at the Allan Border Field. The centre now serves as the headquarters of the Queensland Cricket Association.

The Brisbane bid for the 2032 Summer Olympics includes building an athlete's village in Albion. Another is proposed at the Gold Coast.

== Demographics ==
In the 2016 census, Albion had a population of 2,296 people.

In the 2021 census, Albion had a population of 3,446 people.

== Heritage listings ==
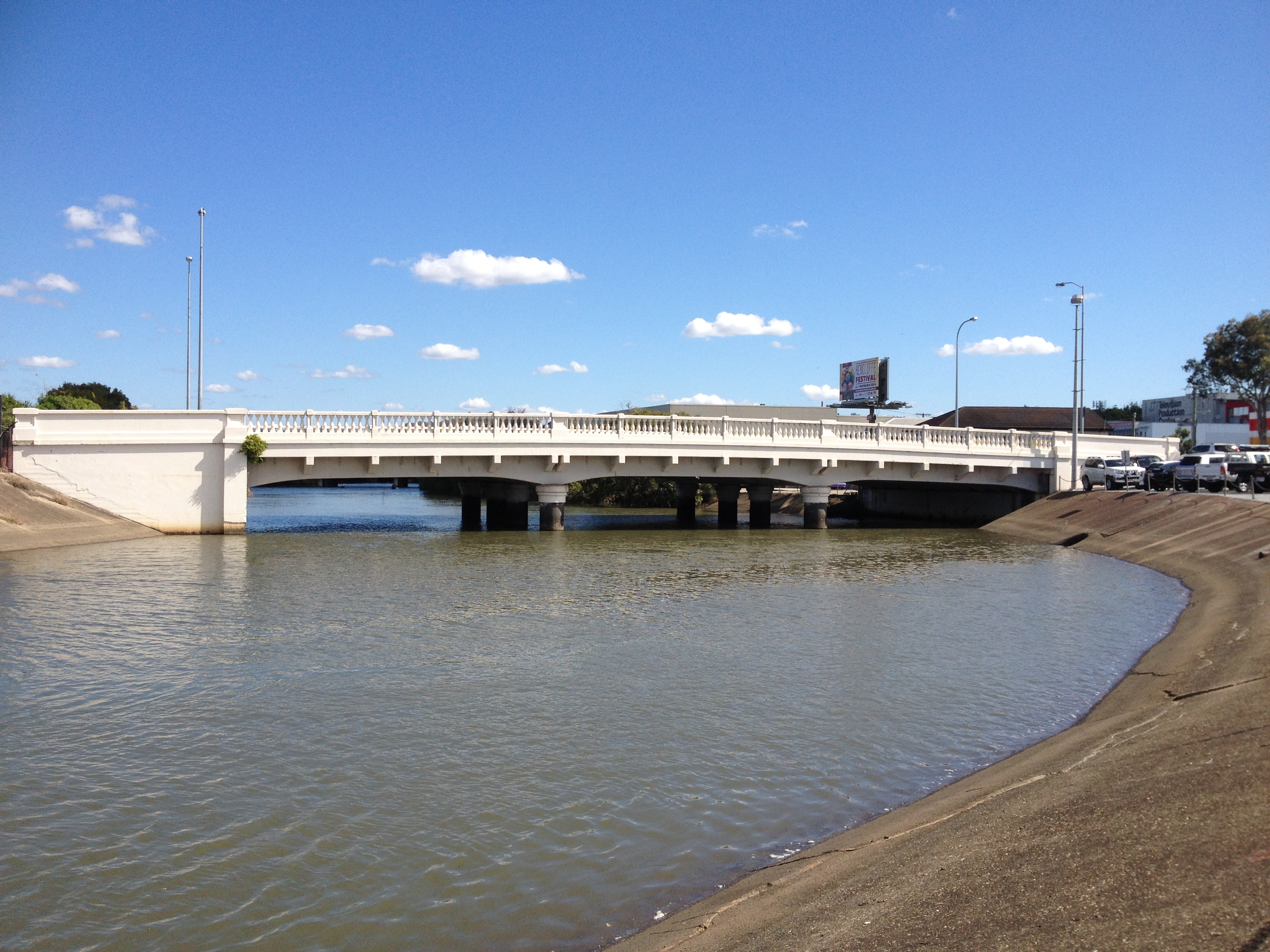
Abbotsford Road Bridge, listed on the Brisbane Heritage Register

Albion has a number of heritage-listed sites, including:

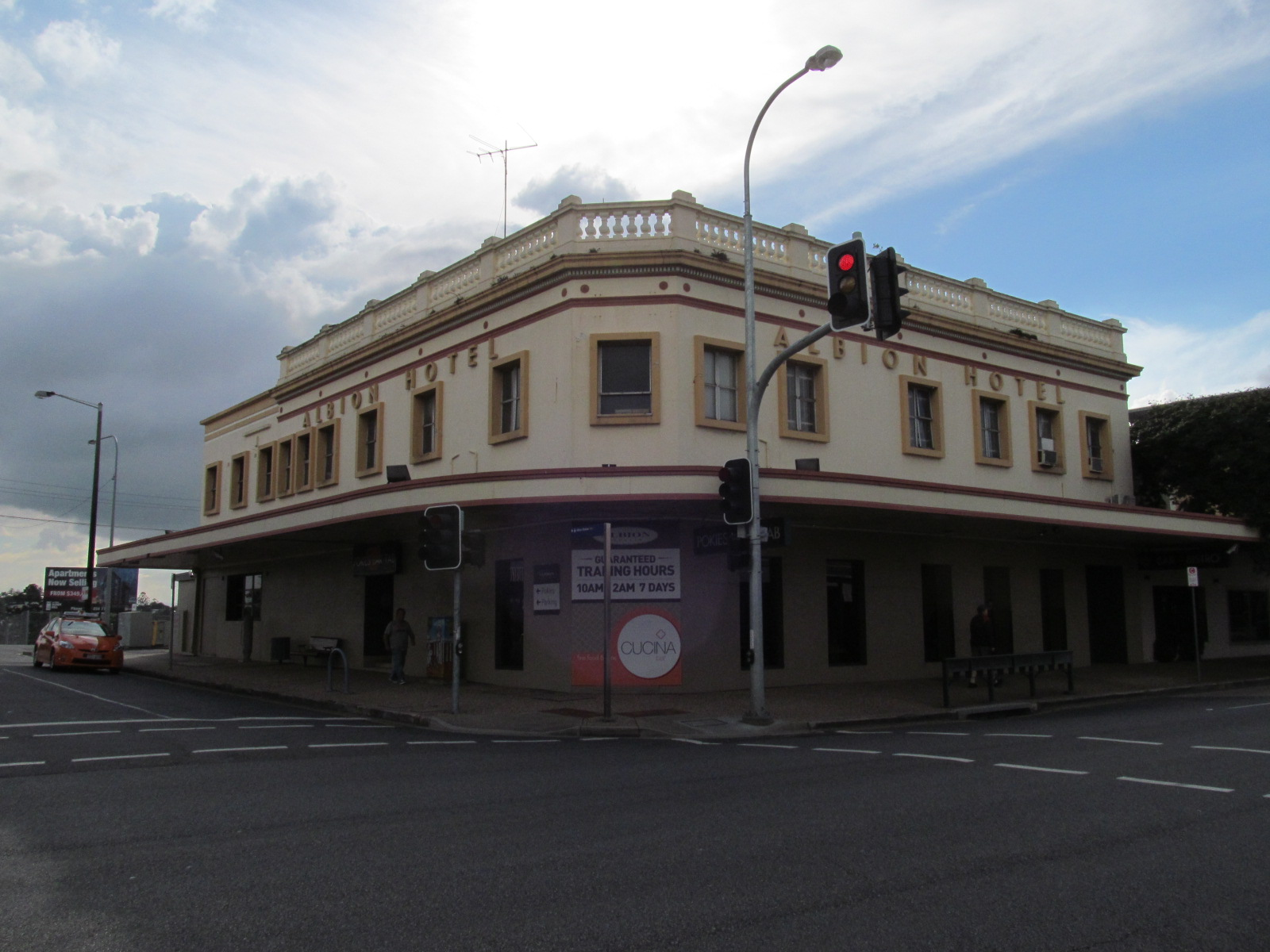
Albion Hotel, 2013, listed on the Brisbane Heritage Register

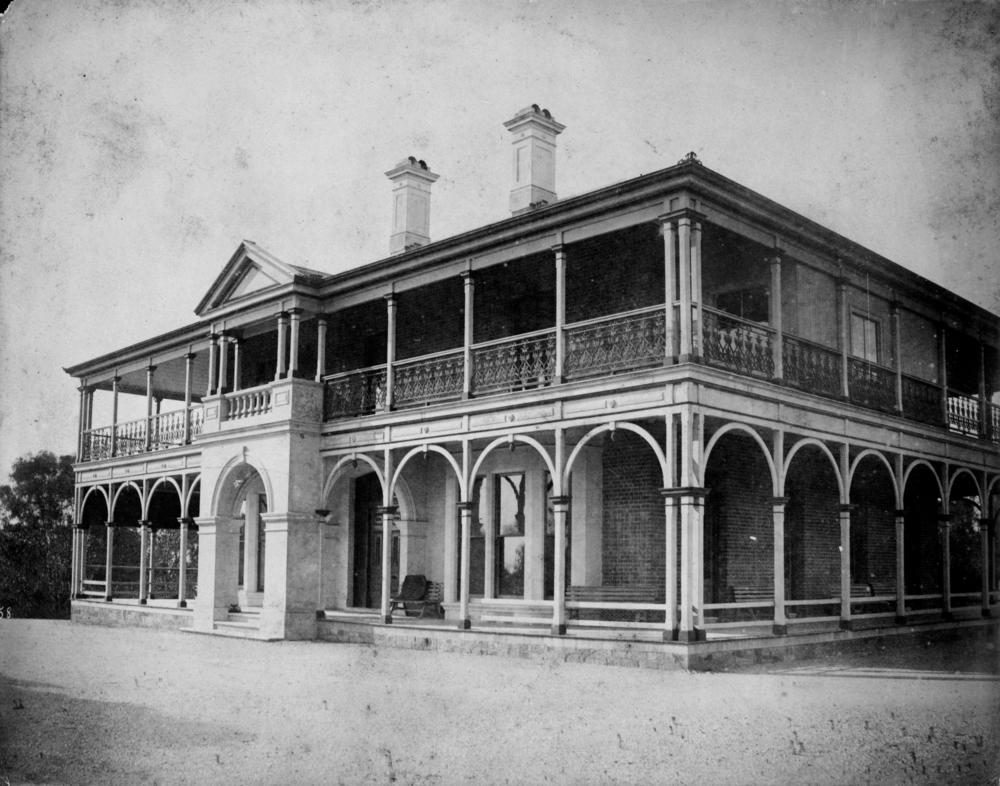
"Whytecliffe", liste on the Brisbane Heritage Register, 1930

- Abbotsford Road: Abbotsford Road Bridge
- 21 Birkbeck Street: Dunaverty
- 12 Gore Street: former MUIOOF Lodge Hall
- 58 Grove Street: Early Cottage
- 32 Higgs Street (27.4393°S 153.0453°E): Holy Triad Temple
- 60 Hudson Street: former Albion Flour Mill
- 2 Kingsford Smith Drive: Breakfast Creek Hotel
- 17 Lever Street: Herberton Cottage
- 16 McLennan Street: Fire of Hope Baptist Church Manse & Hall
- 27 McLennan Street: residence 'Emerald' (now 'Fakenham')
- 40 McLennan Street: residence 'Argyle'
- Sandgate Road: Remnants of the 2nd Breakfast Creek Bridge (North)
- 282 Sandgate Road: Shops
- 297 Sandgate Road: Albion Building
- 299 Sandgate Road: Wyllie's Buildings (Shops)
- 300 Sandgate Road: Albion Hotel (the second hotel on the site, not the one that gave the name to the suburb)
- 327 Sandgate Road: former Commonwealth Bank
- 334 Sandgate Road: Albion Exchange
- 336 Sandgate Road: Shops
- 344 Sandgate Road: former Albion Public Hall
- 349 Sandgate Road: former Albion Post Office
- 366 Sandgate Road: Corner Shop and original baker's oven
- 414 Sandgate Road: Shop and residence
- 469 Sandgate Road: St Columban's Christian Brothers College, Whytecliffe, Highlands (former)
- 475 Sandgate Road: Shops
- 10 Stoneleigh Street: Residence 'Whetfield'
- 24 Stoneleigh Street: 19th century cottage
- 63 & 65 Stoneleigh Street: Duplex 'Caders'

== Transport ==
On the Queensland Rail City network, Albion is serviced by Albion railway station on the Airport, Doomben, Caboolture, Shorncliffe and Sunshine Coast lines.

Historically, Albion lay on the Clayfield tram line, along Sandgate Road. It was operated by the Brisbane City Council until 13 April 1969.

== Education ==
There are no schools in Albion. The nearest government primary schools are Windsor State School in neighbouring Windsor to the west, Wooloowin State School in neighbouring Wooloowin to the north, Eagle Junction State School in neighbouring Clayfield to the north-east, and Ascot State School in neighbouring Ascot to the east. The nearest government secondary school is Kedron State High School in Kedron to the north.

== Amenities ==
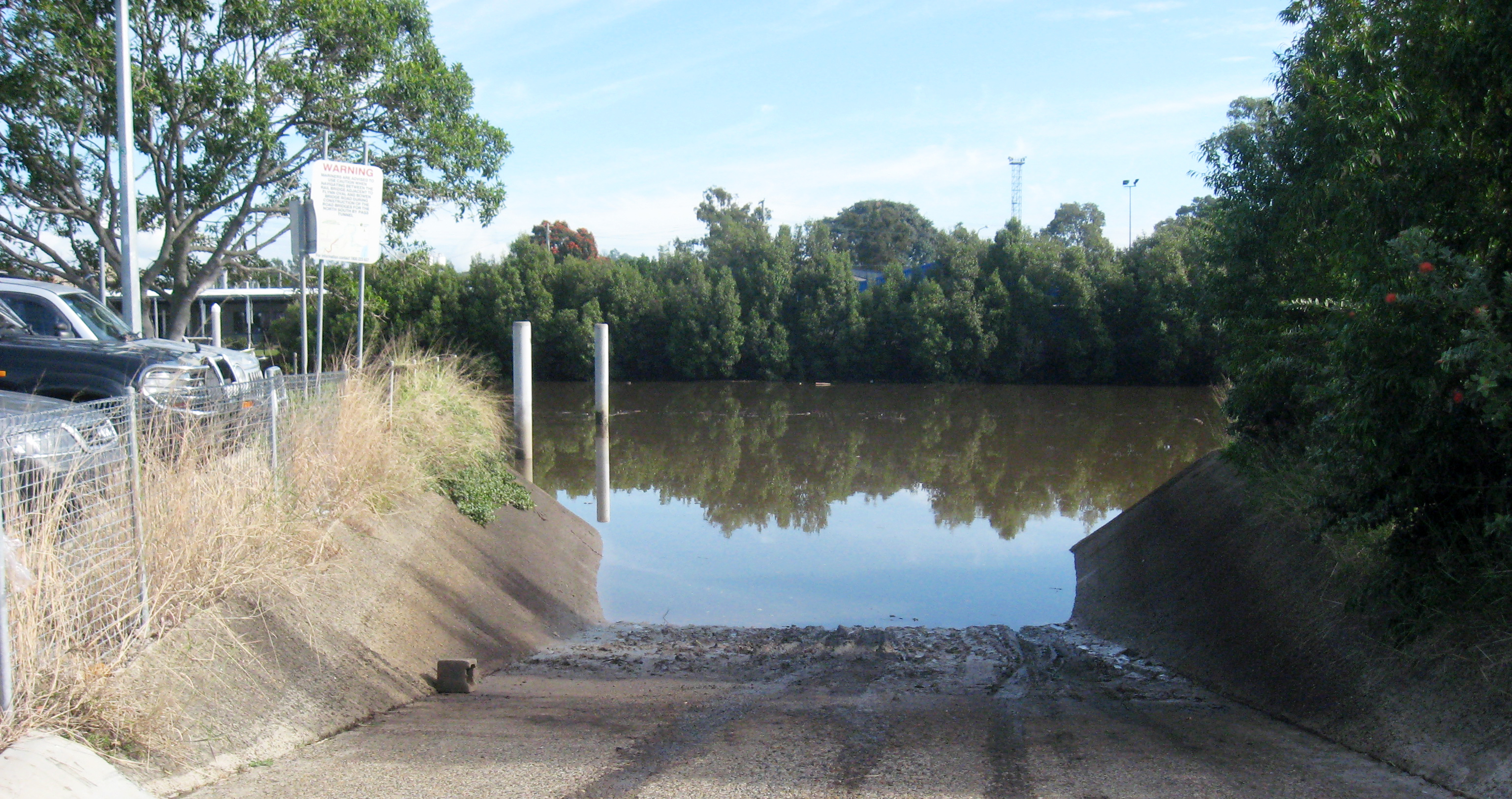
Boat ramp into Breakfast Creek, 2009

Brothers Rugby Club is 103 Crosby Road in Crosby Park (27.4330°S 153.0471°E).

Queensland Cricket has its headquarters at Allan Border Field, 1 Greg Chappell Street (27.4354°S 153.0454°E).

There is a boat ramp on Beaumont Street in Yowoggera Park on the north bank of Breakfast Creek (27.4375°S 153.0422°E). It is managed by the Brisbane City Council.

There are a number of parks in Albion:

- Albion Overpass Park (27.4298°S 153.0390°E)
- Albion Post Office Park (27.4291°S 153.0431°E)
- Crosby Park (27.4344°S 153.0469°E)
- Yowoggera Park (27.4388°S 153.0424°E)

== Attractions ==
The Breakfast Creek Hotel is a tourist attraction at 2 Kingsford Smith Drive (27.4404°S 153.0459°E).

The Albion Park Paceway is a harness racing club and greyhound racing track in Yulestar Street (27.4377°S 153.0464°E).
