= James Hipwood =

Australian politician

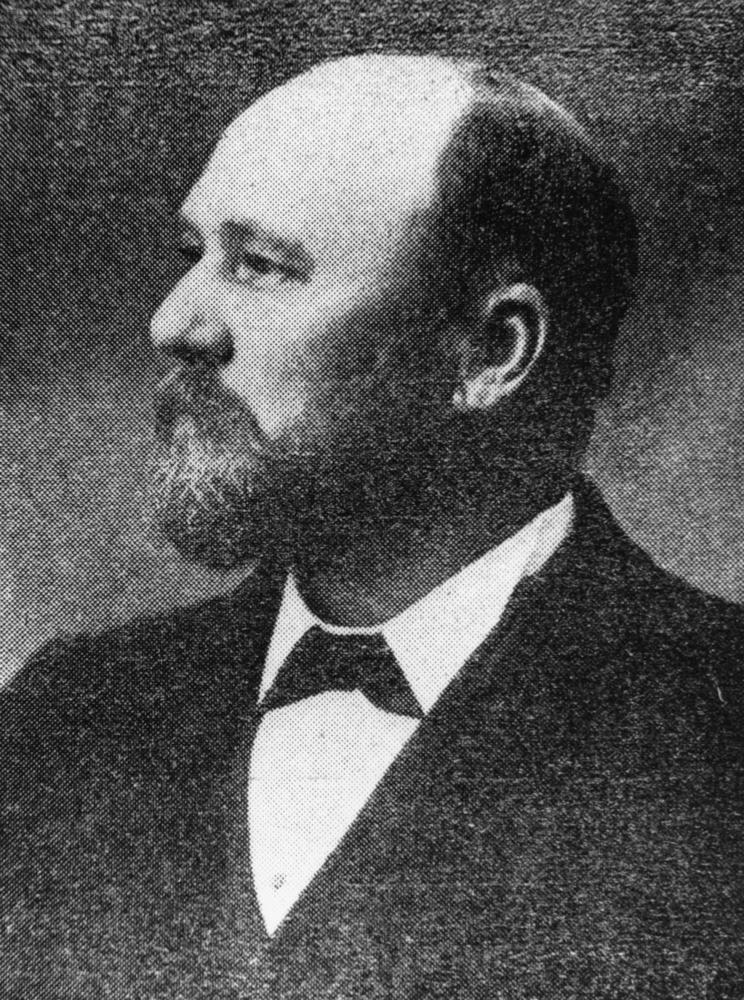
- James Hipwood in 1902.

20th Mayor of Brisbane
- In office 1886–1887
- Preceded by: Ben Babbidge
- Succeeded by: Richard Southall

Personal details
- Born: James Hipwood; 2 December 1842 Sydney, New South Wales, Australia
- Died: 22 January 1926 (aged 83) Brisbane, Queensland, Australia
- Resting place: Balmoral Cemetery
- Spouse: Mary Ann McCready (m.1864 d.1913)
- Occupation: Brassfounder, Coppersmith

James Hipwood (2 December 1842 – 22 January 1926) was an Australian politician. He was an alderman on the Brisbane Municipal Council from 1884 to 1897, and mayor of Brisbane, Queensland from 1886 to 1887.

== Personal life ==
James Hipwood was born in Sydney on 2 December 1842, the son of William Hooper Hipwood and Mary Ann (née Hayes). He was educated to age 13 at St Andrew's School. He married Mary Ann McCready at St Andrew's Cathedral, Sydney on 22 September 1864. While in Sydney, the couple had three daughters:

- Mary Ann (born 1865 Sydney, died 1934 Brisbane)
- Rebecca Elizabeth (born 1867 Sydney, married 1892 Brisbane to John William Wright, died 1956 Brisbane)
- Martha Jane (born 1869 Sydney, married 1891 Brisbane to architect Henry Wallace Atkinson, died 1920 Brisbane)

James Hipwood arrived in Brisbane in 1870, where the couple had a further nine children:

- Sarah Ann (born 1871 Brisbane, died 1873 Brisbane)
- Eva (born 1873 Brisbane, married 1897 Brisbane to Frederick Walker Carter, died 1956 Brisbane)
- Georgie Ada (born 1875 Brisbane, married 1895 Brisbane to William Lahey Nicklin, died 1923 Brisbane)
- Maggie May (born 1878 Brisbane, married 1913 Brisbane to John Evans, died 1931 Brisbane)
- Zillah (born 1880 Brisbane, died 1949 Brisbane)
- Beatrice Maud (born 1882 Brisbane, died 1953 Brisbane)
- James Joseph (born 1884 Brisbane, died 1964 Brisbane)
- Vera Constance (born 1886 Brisbane, married 1916 William Phillips Watts, died 1946 Brisbane)
- Arthur William Hipwood (born 1889, died 1889 Brisbane)

James Hipwood died in Brisbane on 22 January 1926. His wife Mary Ann predeceased him in Brisbane on 8 January 1913. They were buried in Balmoral Cemetery, Brisbane (also called Bulimba Cemetery).

== Business life ==
James Hipwood was a brassfounder and coppersmith. Having left school at age 13, he worked for P.N. Russell and Company, ironfounders and shipbuilders, where he became a foreman.

Coming to Brisbane in 1870, he joined Joseph William Sutton in the firm Hipwood & Sutton in Eagle Street. This partnership was dissolved in 1877 and James and his brother George Samuel Hipwood formed the business Hipwood Brothers in Edward Street.

He was one of the founders of Queensland Trustees Limited and the South Brisbane Milling Company. He was also involved in the formation of the Queensland Mutual Insurance Company and the Queensland Deposit Bank. He was a director of the Queensland Brewery Company (eventually merged into Carlton & United Breweries).

== Public life ==
James Hipwood was an alderman of the Brisbane Municipal Council from 1884 to 1897 and mayor in 1886 and 1887. He served on the following committees:

- Finance Committee 1884, 1885, 1888, 1890, 1891, 1893, 1895
- Health Committee 1884, 1886, 1887, 1888, 1890, 1891
- Legislative Committee 1885, 1886, 1888, 1889, 1891, 1893, 1895, 1897
- Works Committee 1886, 1887, 1888, 1889, 1891, 1894, 1896
- Town Hall Committee 1886, 1887
- Street Lighting Committee 1891
- Parks Committee 1896

James Hipwood was also a member of the Coorparoo Shire Council from 1888 to 1891 and its president in 1890.

He was president of the Traffic Board in 1894 and 1895.

== See also ==
- List of mayors and lord mayors of Brisbane
