= Richard Southall =

Mayor of Brisbane

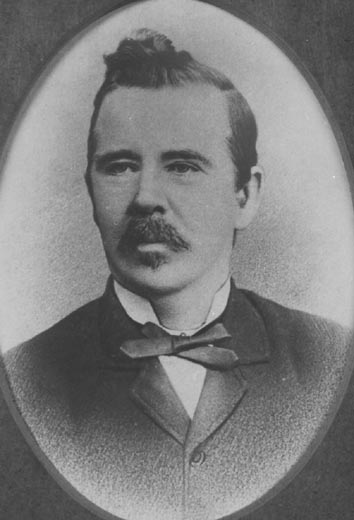

21st Mayor of Brisbane
- In office 1888–1888
- Preceded by: James Hipwood
- Succeeded by: William Galloway

Personal details
- Born: Richard Southall; 1831 Marylebone, London, England
- Died: 4 February 1909 (aged 77–78) South Brisbane, Queensland, Australia
- Resting place: Toowong Cemetery
- Spouse: Janet Banks Guild (m.1852 d.1905)
- Occupation: Building contractor

Richard Southall (1831 – 4 February 1909) was mayor of Brisbane, Queensland, Australia in 1888.

== Personal life ==
Richard Southall was born in 1831 in Marylebone, London, England, the son of Richard Southall and Margaret (née Manay), and educated in London.

Richard married Janet Banks Guild, daughter of Robert Guild and Margaret (née McFarlane), at Hampstead in 1852.

The family immigrated to Queensland in 1869.

On 30 September 1892, Richard Southall was visiting the baths at Sandgate, Queensland, when a large wave washed him from where he was sitting into deeper water. Not being able to swim, he would have drowned, except that a young clerk, Leon Burguez, jumped in fully clothed and rescued Richard Southall. Leon Burguez received a certificate of merit from the Royal Humane Society of Australasia for his bravery. Leon Burguez was later to marry Richard Southall's daughter Adelaide Ellen in 1897.

Richard Southall died at his residence "Ellesmere", Merivale Street, South Brisbane on Thursday 4 February 1909 at Brisbane. He was buried in Toowong Cemetery.

== Business life ==
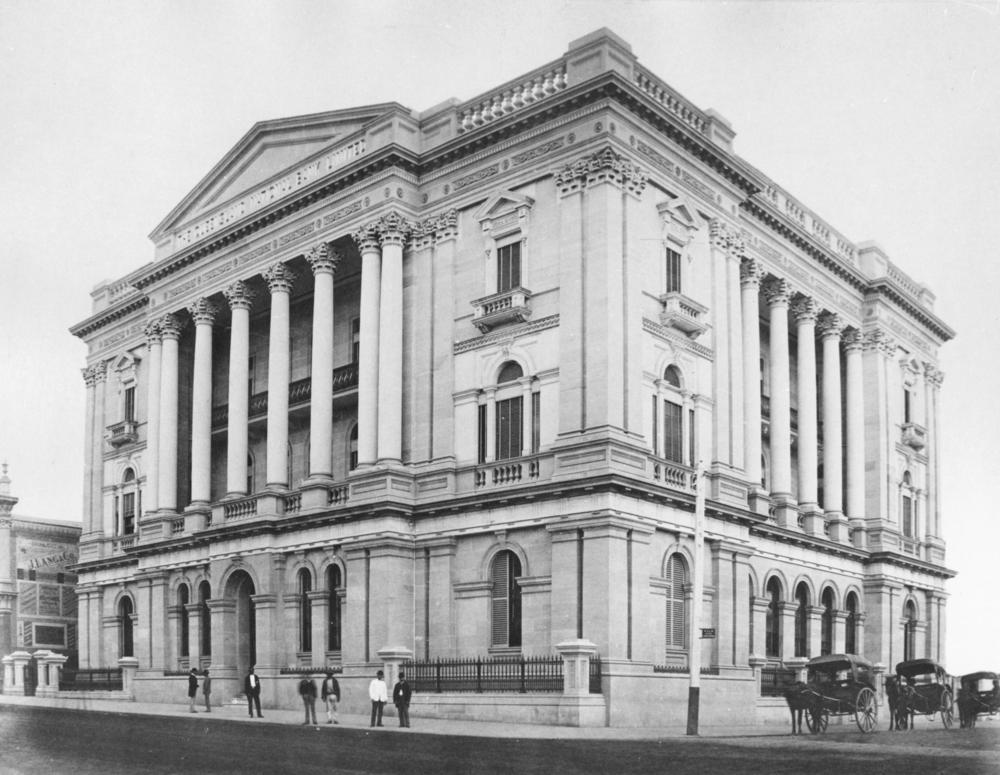
Queensland National Bank building, Queen Street, Brisbane, was built by Richard Southall

Richard Southall was apprenticed to a building contractor in London, before entering into business on his own account.

After immigrating to Brisbane in 1869, he tried farming on the Logan River for three years, but eventually decided that building work in Brisbane would be more profitable and entered into a partnership, Southall & Tracey, to resume work as a contractor; the partnership continued until 1877.

Richard Southall built many important Queensland buildings, including the Queensland National Bank building in Queen Street, Brisbane.

== Public life ==
Richard Southall was an alderman of the Brisbane Municipal Council from 1885 to 1888. He was mayor in 1888. He served on the following committees:

- Finance Committee 1885, 1887
- Legislative Committee 1886
- Town Hall Committee 1886, 1887
- Works Committee 1886
- Health Committee 1886, 1887

== See also ==
- List of mayors and lord mayors of Brisbane
