= William Charles Costin =

Charles William Costin
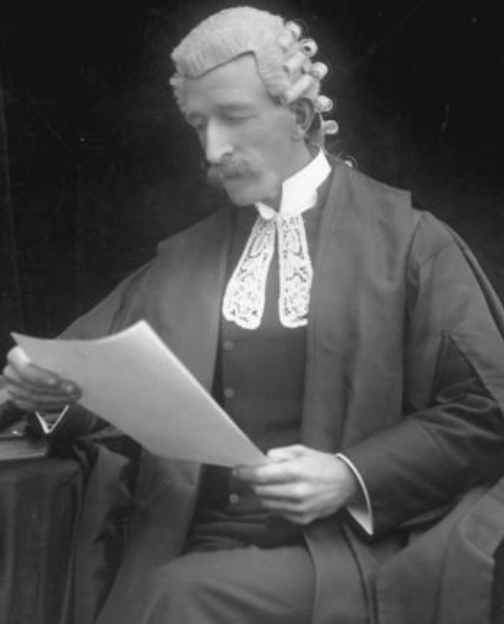
- Born: William Charles Costin; 16 December 1860; Brisbane, Australia
- Died: 12 September 1915 (aged 54); Brisbane, Australia
- Other name: C. W. Costin
- Occupation: Clerk of the Parliaments
- Years active: 31
- Predecessor: Henry Wyatt Radford
- Successor: Carlton Robinson Gregory

Charles William Costin (16 December 1860 – 12 September 1915) was a prominent public servant in Queensland. He was the Clerk of the Queensland Legislative Council, Clerk of Parliaments, and author of "The Relations between the two Houses (Queensland); he also was president and vice president of the Australian Natives' Association in Queensland

== Personal life ==
He was born William Charles Costin on 16 December 1860, but is better known as Charles William Costin. His father was William John Costin Chemist, Queensland Drug Company. Mother: Mary Anne (née Markwell) He married: Ellen O'Donnell (née Sutton), 27 May 1890. Their only son Lieutenant Joseph William Costin was killed in action at Lone Pine, 25 April 1915, on the Gallipoli Peninsula.)

== Early Education and career ==
Costin was first educated at the Gympie Slate School. Here he earned a scholarship which entitled him to three years schooling at the Brisbane Grammar School. After this three years he was granted an extra two years free. He then worked as a journalist for the Brisbane Courier the "Daily Observer", the Telegraph (Brisbane) and The Toowoomba Chronicle.He tutored the sons of L. A. Bernays (who was Clerk of the Legislative Assembly). He was appointed to a position on the Queensland "Hansard" staff, before becoming the third Clerk of the Legislative Assembly of Queensland.

== Parliamentary Service ==
- 1884 to 1896. Third Clerk of the Legislative Assembly of Queensland. Govt.gazette 16 September 1884
- 1888 Secretary for the Botanic Gardens. (Blue Book of Queensland 1889.)
- 1895 Acting Sergeant at Arms, from The Telegraph 5 December 1895.
- 1896 to 1902. Clerk Assistant in the Queensland Legislative Council. Gov.gaz. 11 March 1896. (Appointed by the Governor in the Council upon President's nomination.)
- 1896 to 1908. Usher of the Black Rod in the Legislative Council. Gov.gaz. 11 March 1896 https:
- 1902 until his death 12 September 1915. Clerk of the Legislative Council. Gov. gaz. 21 June 1902. (Appointed by the Governor in the council, by the commission under the Great Seal of the Colony.)
- 1902 until his death 12 September 1915. Clerk of Parliaments. (Joint Departments of the Legislative Council and The Legislative Assembly.)
- 1909 10 Dec Presented the University Bill to be signed by His Excellency the Governor Sir William MacGregor, at the Inauguration of the University of Queensland.

== Public Service ==
- President and Vice President of the Australian Natives' Association.(The Telegraph 2 April 1906).
- Member of the Royal Society of St George.(The Brisbane Courier, 16 May 1908).
- Member of the Royal Geographical Society (Queensland).(The Telegraph 26 November 1904).
- Secretary of the trustees of the Mount Coot-tha, Queensland.(The Telegraph 10 January 1903).
- Secretary Johnsonian Club. (The Queenslander 18 October 1884).
- Captain of the Brisbane Rifle Club. see: nla.gov.au/nla.news-page1587194
- Vice president of Queensland Rifle Association.
- President of the Brisbane Grammar School Old Boys Association 1905-06 (B.G.S.O.B.A.). In 1919 the Brisbane Grammar School awarded a C.W. COSTIN MEMORIAL MEDAL: to the Champion Rifle Shot.
- Member of the Royal Society of Queensland.
