= Chermside =

Chermside may refer to:

== People ==
- Herbert Chermside (1850–1929), British general and governor of Queensland, Australia
- Robert Alexander Chermside (1792–1860), British physician

== Places ==
- Chermside, Queensland, a major suburb of the City of Brisbane, Queensland, Australia
  - Chermside bus station, a bus station at Chermside, Queensland, Australia
  - Westfield Chermside, a large shopping centre in Queensland, Australia
- Chermside West, Queensland, a suburb in the City of Brisbane, Queensland, Australia
- Electoral district of Chermside, an electoral district of the Legislative Assembly in Queensland, Australia
  - Electoral results for the district of Chermside
