= Keith Schafferius =

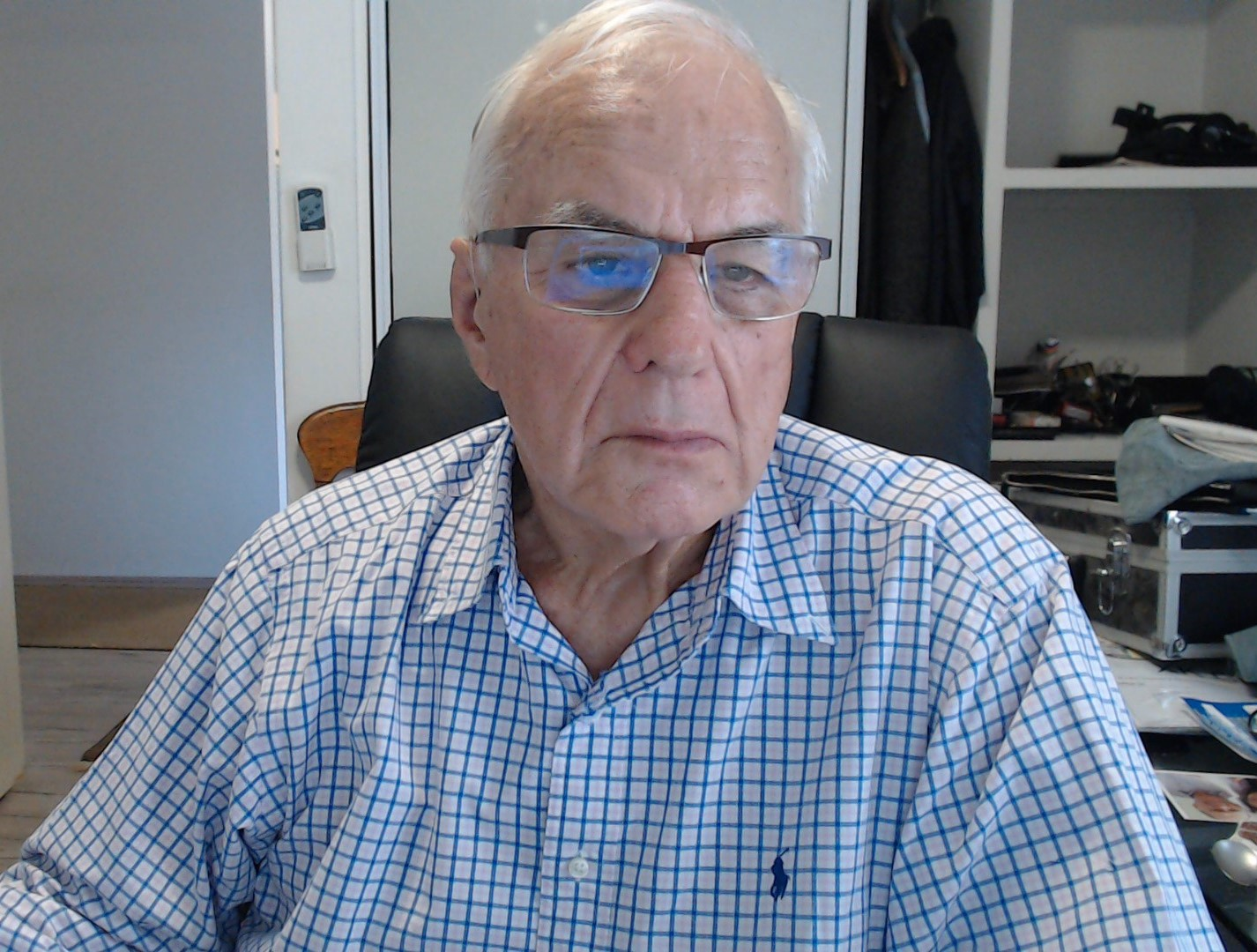
- Born: 3 April 1942 (age 84); Laidley, Queensland
- Occupations: Investigator, author
- Website: https://www.keithschafferius.com/

Keith Schafferius (born 1942, in Laidley, Queensland) is a law enforcement agent, author and a private investigator based in Australia.

== Career ==
Schafferius started his career by joining the Royal Australian Air Force (RAAF) in 1960 where he was enlisted for six years and spent time as a member of the Service Police and received an Australian Defence Medal for his service. After exiting the Air Force and completing a secondment to the Australian Security Intelligence Organisation (ASIO), Schafferius took on his first private investigation case in 1969 together with Charles Holloway. In 1973, Keith joined the World Association of Detectives (W.A.D.) and became a LIFE member after 25 years. Keith took on his first case in 1969 to retrieve children abducted by the other parent. Keith was awarded investigator of the year 2013 at the 88th annual conference of the W.A.D. Later, he become the director of W.A.D. for 3 years. In 1990 he ran in the Federal seat of Brisbane as the candidate for the Liberal Party of Australia. In 1992, Schafferius was also a candidate for the Queensland Liberal Party in the state seat of Chermside.
