= T J Byrnes Monument =

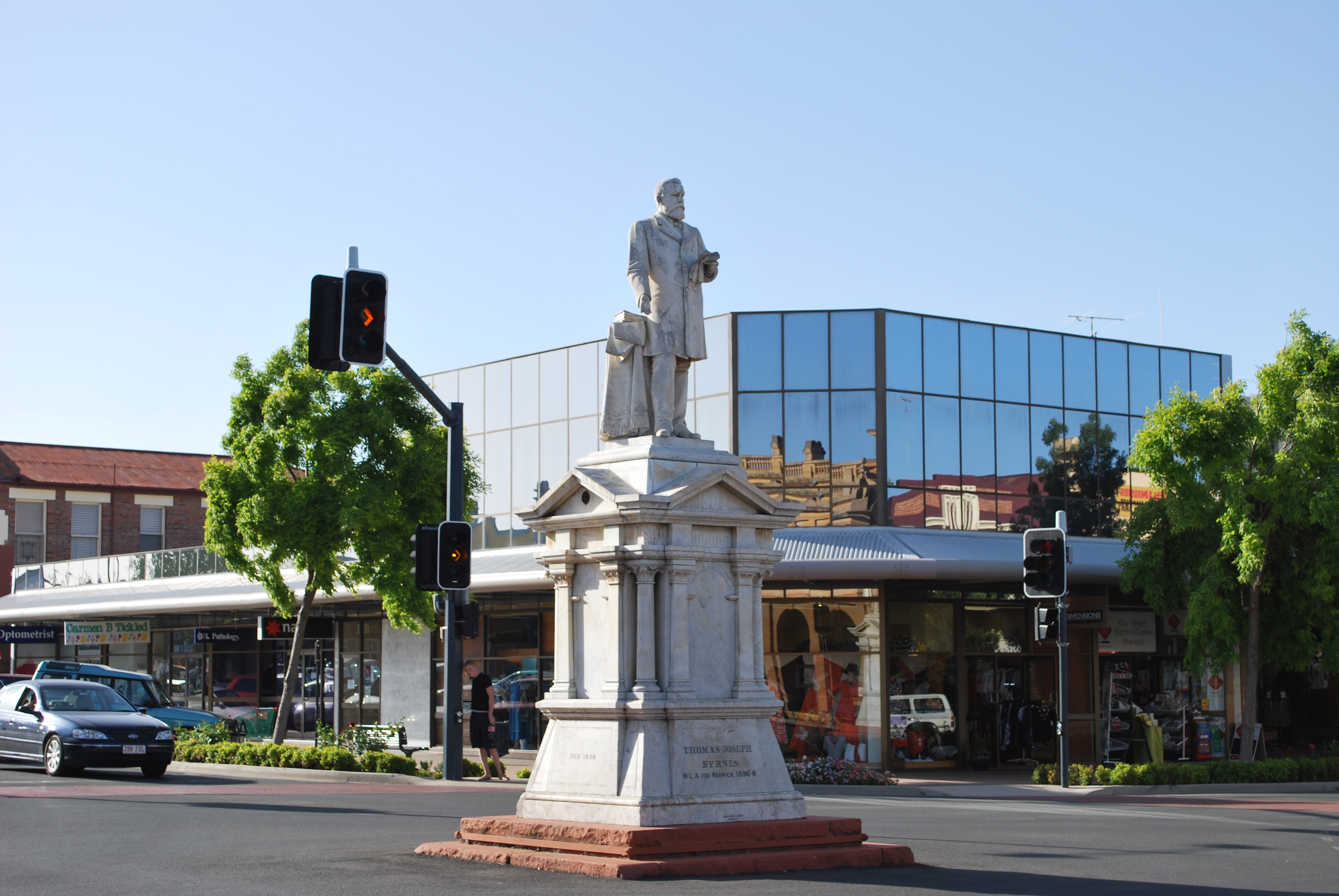
- Thomas Joseph Byrnes Monument, Warwick, 2008

- Location within Queensland Location within Australia
- 28.2162°S 152.0326°E
- Location: Palmerin Street, Warwick, Southern Downs Region, Queensland, Australia

History
- Design period: 1900–1914 (early 20th century)
- Built: 1901–1902

Site notes
- Architect: Andrews Bros (Sydney)

Queensland Heritage Register
- Official name: T J Byrnes Monument
- Type: state heritage (built)
- Designated: 6 January 1999
- Reference no.: 602076
- Significant period: 1900s (fabric)
- Significant components: statue
- Builders: Andrew Brothers (Sydney)

T J Byrnes Monument is a heritage-listed memorial at Palmerin Street, Warwick, Southern Downs Region, Queensland, Australia. It commemorates Thomas Joseph Byrnes, the short-lived Premier of Queensland who died in office in 1898. It was designed by Andrews Bros (Sydney) and built from 1901 to 1902 by Andrew Brothers (Sydney). It was added to the Queensland Heritage Register on 6 January 1999.

== History ==
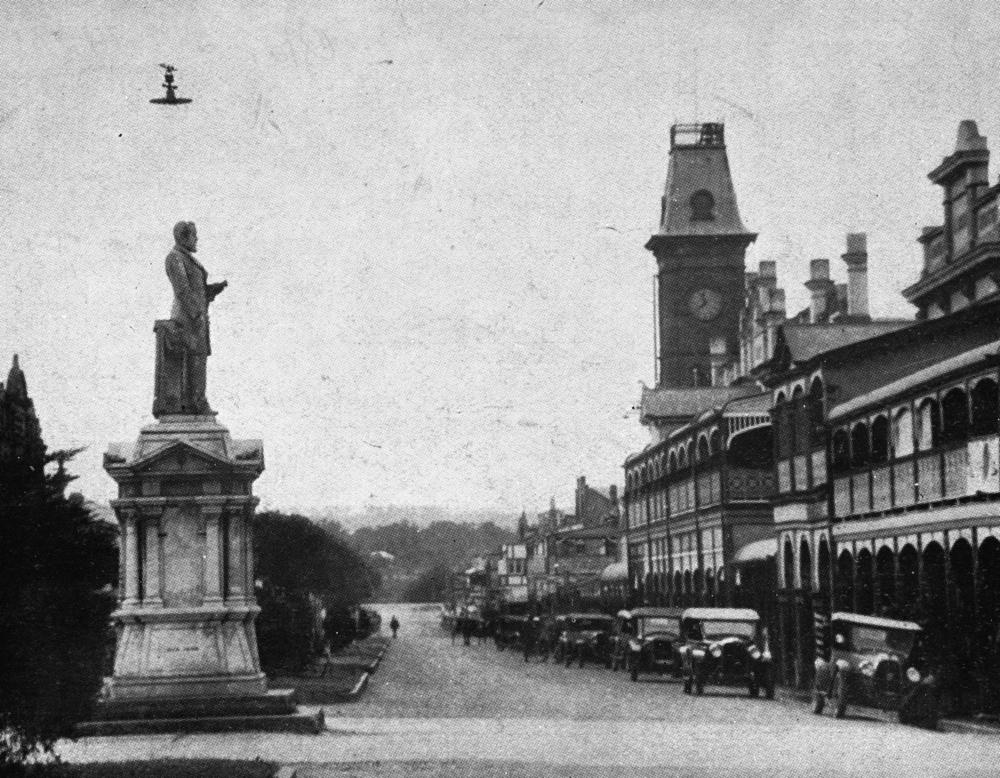
Statue of Thomas Joseph Byrnes, Warwick, circa 1932

This monument was erected in 1902 by the citizens of Warwick and district to honour the former Premier of Queensland and MLA for Warwick, Thomas Joseph Byrnes, who died on 27 September 1898 at the age of 37. He was the first Queensland-born premier of Queensland, and had held office for only five months prior to his death. The sudden loss of this youthful, charismatic leader shocked Queenslanders, who mourned the passing of his vision of a strong and vibrant Queensland as much as of the man himself. Byrnes is the only Queensland premier to be honoured with two memorial statues (the other being erected in 1902 on the corner of Wickham and Boundary Streets in Petrie Bight, Brisbane and relocated in 1925 to Centenary Place), and is one of only three Queensland premiers (along with Sir Charles Lilley and Thomas Joseph Ryan) to have a medal for scholarship posthumously endowed in his name.

Byrnes was born into a large, impoverished Irish Catholic family in Brisbane in 1860. In 1866 the family moved to Bowen, where Byrnes was educated at the local primary school. In 1874 he won a scholarship to the Brisbane Grammar School, where he won the Lilley gold medal for distinction in Greek, Latin and English, annually from 1875 to 1877. In 1876 he won the University of Sydney prize in the junior public examination, which granted him an extension scholarship to complete his secondary education at Brisbane Grammar School. This was followed in 1879 with a scholarship to Melbourne University where he graduated in Arts (1882) and in Law (1884) – both with honours. On 8 July 1884 he was admitted to the bar in Victoria, but returned to Brisbane immediately and was admitted as a Queensland barrister on 5 August 1884. During 1884–85 Byrnes read law in the chambers of Patrick Real, then built up his own large, successful law practice in Brisbane.

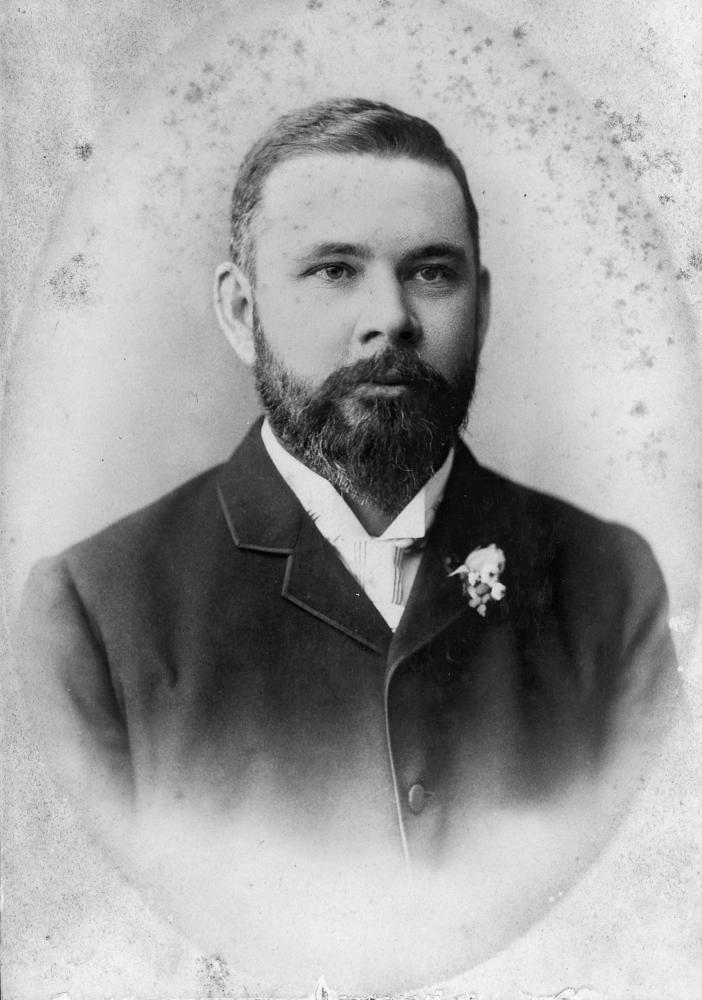
Thomas Joseph Byrnes

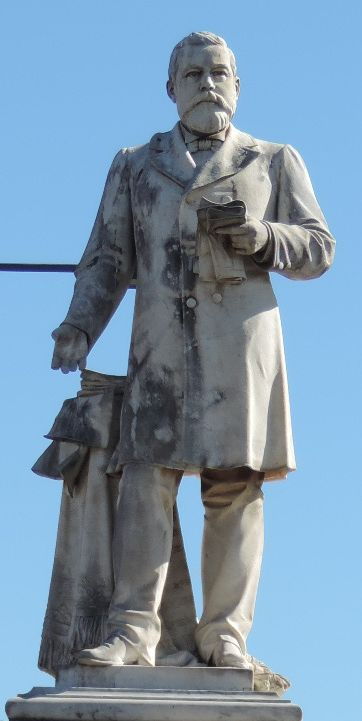
Close-up of statue, 2015

In 1890 Byrnes entered politics. He was elected to the Queensland Legislative Council in August and was given the portfolio of Solicitor-General in Sir Samuel Griffith's newly formed coalition government. Byrnes' politics were essentially Catholic conservative. Although at this time he supported Federation, he opposed the Shearers' Strike of 1891, invoking an outdated conspiracy law to convict unionist strike leaders.

In March 1893 Byrnes was appointed Attorney-General, and held this portfolio until his death in 1898. He entered the Legislative Assembly as MLA for Cairns (Sir Charles Lilley's 'pocket borough) from April 1893 to April 1896. Byrnes' policies at this period received considerable support in far north Queensland – he advocated the continued use of South Sea Islander labour and declared an interest in northern development (without committing himself to separation). Later he became an outspoken opponent of the separationist movement, which may account for his choosing to stand (unsuccessfully) for North Brisbane in March 1896.

Although nominated for North Brisbane by Premier Hugh Nelson, Byrnes was unpopular in the capital, where he was seen to be concentrating more on his law practice than on his portfolio. His integrity had been called into question in several legal disputes where he used his powers as Attorney-General to further personal interests. However, immediately following his defeat in North Brisbane, Byrnes stood in April 1896 for the electorate of Warwick, where he achieved a resounding victory. At Warwick, Byrnes had a large Irish-Catholic vote as well as the support of Arthur Morgan, owner/editor of the Warwick Argus and former MLA for Warwick who had stood aside for Byrnes' benefit. Byrnes' personal appeal, his Queensland birth, and his conservative politics (advocating the postponement of Queensland's involvement in Federation), contributed to his success. In Warwick, the self-made man epitomised what could be achieved in Queensland, the land of opportunity.

Warwick took great pride in its state representative, and Byrnes reciprocated by assiduously promoting Queensland and his electorate. When he and Premier Nelson represented Queensland at Britain's Diamond Jubilee celebrations in 1897, Byrnes visited Warwick, England to promote his constituency and the Darling Downs, and in June 1898 presented Warwick, Queensland with gifts from its English counterpart.

Early in April 1898 the President of the Queensland Legislative Council, Sir Arthur Hunter Palmer, died. Premier Hugh Nelson succeeded him, and on 13 April 1898, TJ Byrnes was appointed Premier, Chief Secretary and Attorney-General. Fellow Parliamentarians supported his appointment because he was popular with voters, and the struggling coalition government needed the charismatic Attorney-General as their figurehead.

Byrnes was to spend little more than 5 months in office. On 27 September 1898 he died at his residence at Yeronga near Brisbane, after a short illness (pneumonia complicated by a severe cardiac condition), less than 2 months short of his 38th birthday.

On the day following Byrnes' death, all Warwick businesses were shut, and on the day of the state funeral in Brisbane, Warwick schools closed. A week after Byrnes' death the Mayor of Warwick, J Allman, suggested that a fund administered by a citizens committee be established to erect a memorial to Byrnes, in Warwick. A public meeting was called on 20 October 1898, at which time a committee was formed. Over the next 3 years £250 was raised locally from 363 subscribers, and this was matched £ for £ by the Queensland government.

In Brisbane, a Byrnes Memorial Fund was established from which the Byrnes Medal for scholarship was created, and a £2,000 bronze statue was erected in Centenary Place. Warwick also chose a statue as a memorial, but in stone. Erecting a statue was a traditional tribute by European towns and cities to their great men and women, and illustrated as much about the sophistication of the town which commissioned it as about the person being commemorated.

In June 1901 the Warwick committee accepted a tender of £500 by Andrews Bros of Sydney for a marble statue of TJ Byrnes, resting on a marble pedestal. The statue was carved in Italy from Carrara marble and arrived in Sydney about September 1902. Both the statue and the veined Sicilian marble pedestal, designed by ED Andrews, were freighted from Sydney to Warwick by New South Wales and Queensland railways free of charge, and were erected in November 1902 under the supervision of Warwick architect Conrad Cobden Dornbusch.

There had been some committee debate over the most appropriate site for the statue. The original proposal was to locate it opposite the two-storeyed 1897–99 stone post office which had been erected during Byrnes' term as MLA for Warwick. Later, some favoured the Southern Square (now Leslie Park). Both sites were submitted to the Warwick Municipal Council, which preferred the more prominent post office location, so that the children going to school could see the man who rose from the bottom to the top rung of the ladder.

The pedestal was erected at the intersection of Palmerin and Grafton Streets – in the centre of town opposite the post office – on 25 November 1902, and the statue was raised to face the rising sun (looking east along Grafton Street) at daybreak the next day. The whole monument weighed 26 tons, rested on a concrete block and plinth of Melbourne bluestone, and stood 19.5 feet (5.9 m) high. Inscriptions on the four sides of the pedestal read:

Thomas Joseph Byrnes

Born Brisbane 1860

Premier of Queensland 1898

Died 1898.

Following suggestions from local residents, the Warwick Council agreed that

MLA for Warwick 1896 to 1898

should be placed under the name. The monument was surrounded by a temporary wooden picket fence until an iron railing could be erected. This iron railing had been removed by mid-1935.

The statue was unveiled officially on Saturday 13 December 1902 by His Excellency the Governor of Queensland, Sir Herbert Chermside, in the presence of several Byrnes' relatives; the Mayors of Warwick, Brisbane and South Brisbane; the Minister for Railways and Works; the Hon Arthur Morgan (MLA for Warwick 1887–1896 and 1898–1906) and other Warwick dignitaries. Sir Herbert described Byrnes as a great statesman and patriot and stressed the distinction conferred on Warwick by having had the Premier as its representative. All speakers emphasised Byrnes' remarkable academic achievements and charisma, his rise from poverty to greatness, and his Queensland birth, and portrayed him as a role model for Queensland youth. Besides honouring Byrnes, the statue was intended as an example to the young of the possibilities open to even the poorest Queenslander. The unveiling of the monument was an important occasion for Warwick and a souvenir photograph and description were published by the Warwick Examiner and Times.

== Description ==
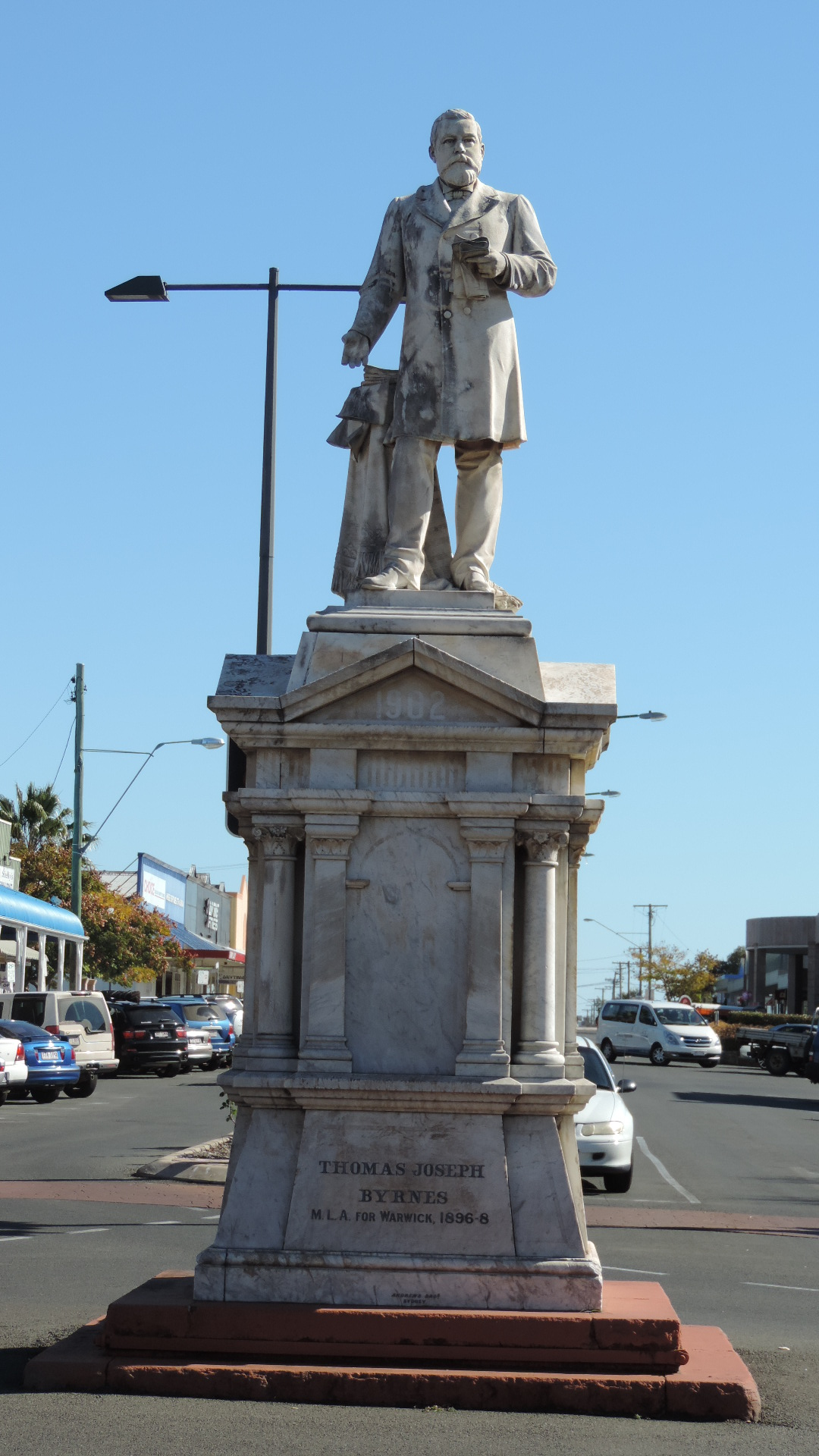
Monument, 2015

The T J Byrnes Monument is located at the intersection of two principal streets in Warwick – Palmerin and Grafton – opposite the Warwick Post Office. It comprises a pedestal and lifelike statue, facing east along Grafton Street, set on two stepped courses of a basaltic rock identified in 1902 as Melbourne bluestone. The whole rests on a concrete base, nearly obscured by later road surfacing.

The pedestal of veined marble is approximately 3.5 metres (11 ft) high, is alike on all four faces, and comprises plinth, dado and entablature. The plinth is a diminishing panelled block with a heavy moulding above. Inscriptions on the four panels of the plinth read: THOMAS JOSEPH BYRNES MLA for Warwick, 1896–98 (east face), Born Brisbane 1860 (north face), Premier of Queensland 1898 (west face), and Died 1898 (south face). At the base of the east face of the plinth is the inscription: Andrews Bros Sydney. The dado forms the shaft of the pedestal. At each corner is a column with foliated capital set in a rectangular recess, and each face has two pilasters either side of a semi-circular headed recess. The entablature consists of architrave, frieze and projecting cornice, with a panelled pediment at the centre of each face. 1902 is inscribed on the pediment of the east face.

The lifelike statue stands larger-than-life at approximately 2 metres (6 ft 7 in) in height. It is carved of a fine white marble. The figure stands as if addressing an assembly, with right hand extended and a manuscript in the left hand. The head is bare, and the figure is clothed in conventional 19th century morning costume.

== Heritage listing ==
The T J Byrnes Monument was listed on the Queensland Heritage Register on 6 January 1999 having satisfied the following criteria.

The place is important in demonstrating the evolution or pattern of Queensland's history.

The TJ Byrnes Monument at Warwick is one of Queensland's earlier public monuments, and makes a significant contribution to our understanding of the way in which Queensland towns and cities honoured their heroes and heroines in the late 19th/early 20th centuries, and promoted them as role models.

The place is important in demonstrating the principal characteristics of a particular class of cultural places.

It remains an excellent example of its type – a lifelike, finely carved statue set high on a decorative pedestal and located at the intersection of two of the principal streets in Warwick – specifically designed and located to impress.

The place is important because of its aesthetic significance.

The monument is significant for its aesthetic and landmark qualities, and has been a prominent part of the Warwick townscape since 1902.

The place has a strong or special association with a particular community or cultural group for social, cultural or spiritual reasons.

The monument is significant for its aesthetic and landmark qualities, and has been a prominent part of the Warwick townscape since 1902.

The place has a special association with the life or work of a particular person, group or organisation of importance in Queensland's history.

As a memorial, the place has a close association with the life and work of T J Byrnes – barrister, politician, and one of Queensland's early heroes.

== See also ==
- Centenary Place in Brisbane for another memorial statue of Thomas Joseph Byrnes
