= Thomas Joseph Byrnes =

Australian politician

The Honourable Thomas Joseph Byrnes
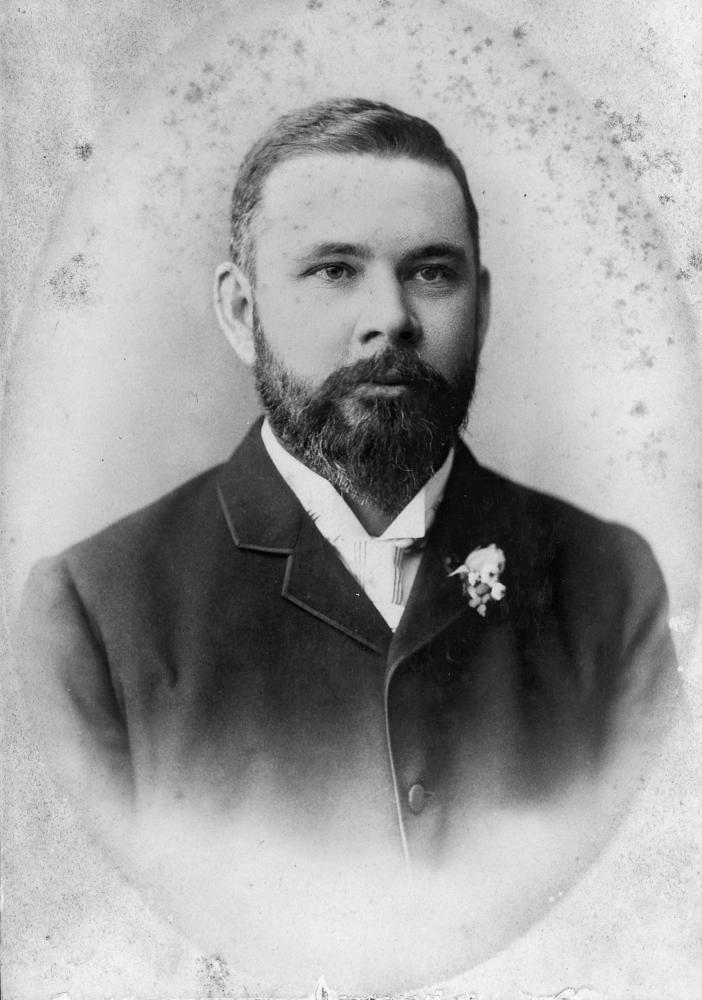

12th Premier of Queensland
- In office 13 April 1898 – 27 September 1898
- Preceded by: Sir Hugh Nelson
- Succeeded by: James Dickson
- Constituency: Warwick

Member of the Queensland Legislative Assembly for Cairns
- In office 29 April 1893 – 4 April 1896
- Preceded by: Frederick Wimble
- Succeeded by: Isidor Lissner

Member of the Queensland Legislative Assembly for Warwick
- In office 4 April 1896 – 27 September 1898
- Preceded by: Arthur Morgan
- Succeeded by: Arthur Morgan

Member of the Queensland Legislative Council
- In office 12 August 1890 – 13 March 1893

Personal details
- Born: 11 November 1860 Spring Hill, Queensland
- Died: 27 September 1898 (aged 37) Brisbane, Queensland
- Resting place: Toowong Cemetery
- Party: Ministerialist
- Education: University of Melbourne
- Occupation: Barrister

Thomas Joseph Byrnes (11 November 1860 – 27 September 1898) was an Australian politician and barrister. He was Premier of Queensland from April 1898 until his death in September of the same year, having previously served in several ministerial positions in his parliamentary career. He was the first Roman Catholic Premier of Queensland and the first to die in office.

== Early life ==
Byrnes was born in Spring Hill, Queensland, to Irish immigrants Patrick Byrnes and his wife Anna, née Tighe. Byrnes was educated at Bowen State School, then, winning a scholarship where he topped the state, he studied at Brisbane Grammar School and then studied arts and law at the University of Melbourne, graduating with honours in both. During his time at the University of Melbourne he became Prelector of the Dialectic Society of Trinity College (University of Melbourne), although he was a non-residential student, winning the Society's inaugural Wigram Allen Prize in 1883, only months after it had been established by Sir George Wigram Allen. In 1882–83 Byrnes taught at Xavier College.

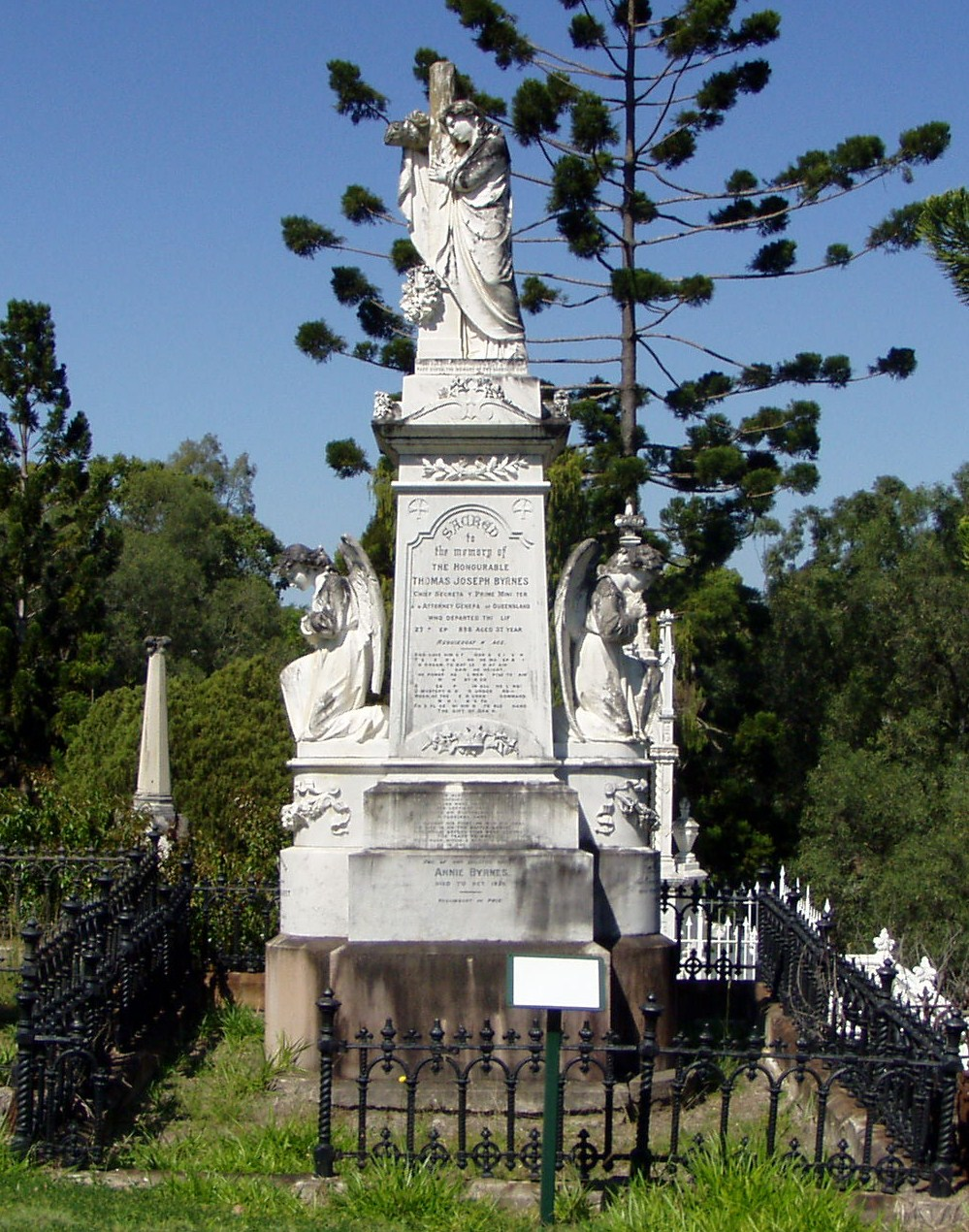
Monument at the burial site of Thomas Joseph Byrnes at Brisbane's Toowong Cemetery.

== Career ==
Byrnes was admitted as a barrister in Victoria on 8 July 1884 and returned for a Queensland admission on 5 August; he then began a successful career as a barrister. Byrnes' talent brought him to the attention of fellow barrister Sir Samuel Griffith, then Premier of Queensland, who had him appointed Solicitor-General with a seat in the Legislative Council. Byrnes stood down from the Legislative Council to successfully stand for Cairns in the Legislative Assembly in 1893. He represented Cairns until 1896, after which he represented Warwick in the Legislative Assembly from 1896 to his death in 1898.

Byrnes continued his private law practice and participated in two major Supreme Court of Queensland cases. In the Queensland Investment Co. v. Grimley case, Byrnes successful conduct of the defence was praised widely. In the John Robb arbitration case of 1892, praise for Byrnes skill was accompanied by public objection to the high fees paid to Samuel Griffith as leading counsel and to Byrnes as one of his assistants. In 1895 and 1897, Byrnes represented Queensland at meetings of the Federal Council of Australasia.

Sir Thomas McIlwraith appointed him as Attorney-General of Queensland in the Continuous Ministry, and when Hugh Nelson stepped down as Premier; Byrnes, the youngest member of the Ministry by a large margin, became Premier.

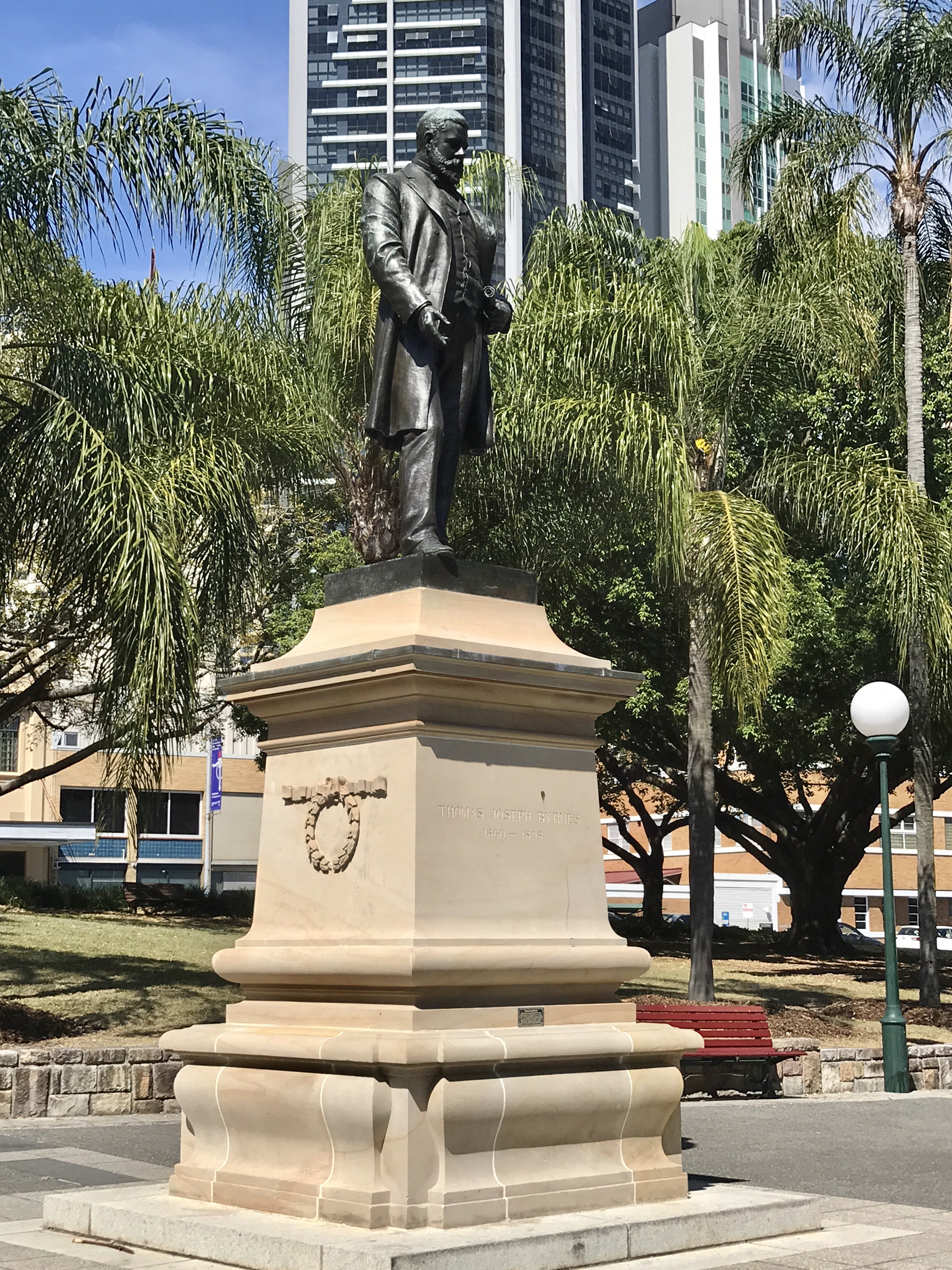
Statue of Thomas Joseph Byrnes in Centenary Place, Brisbane

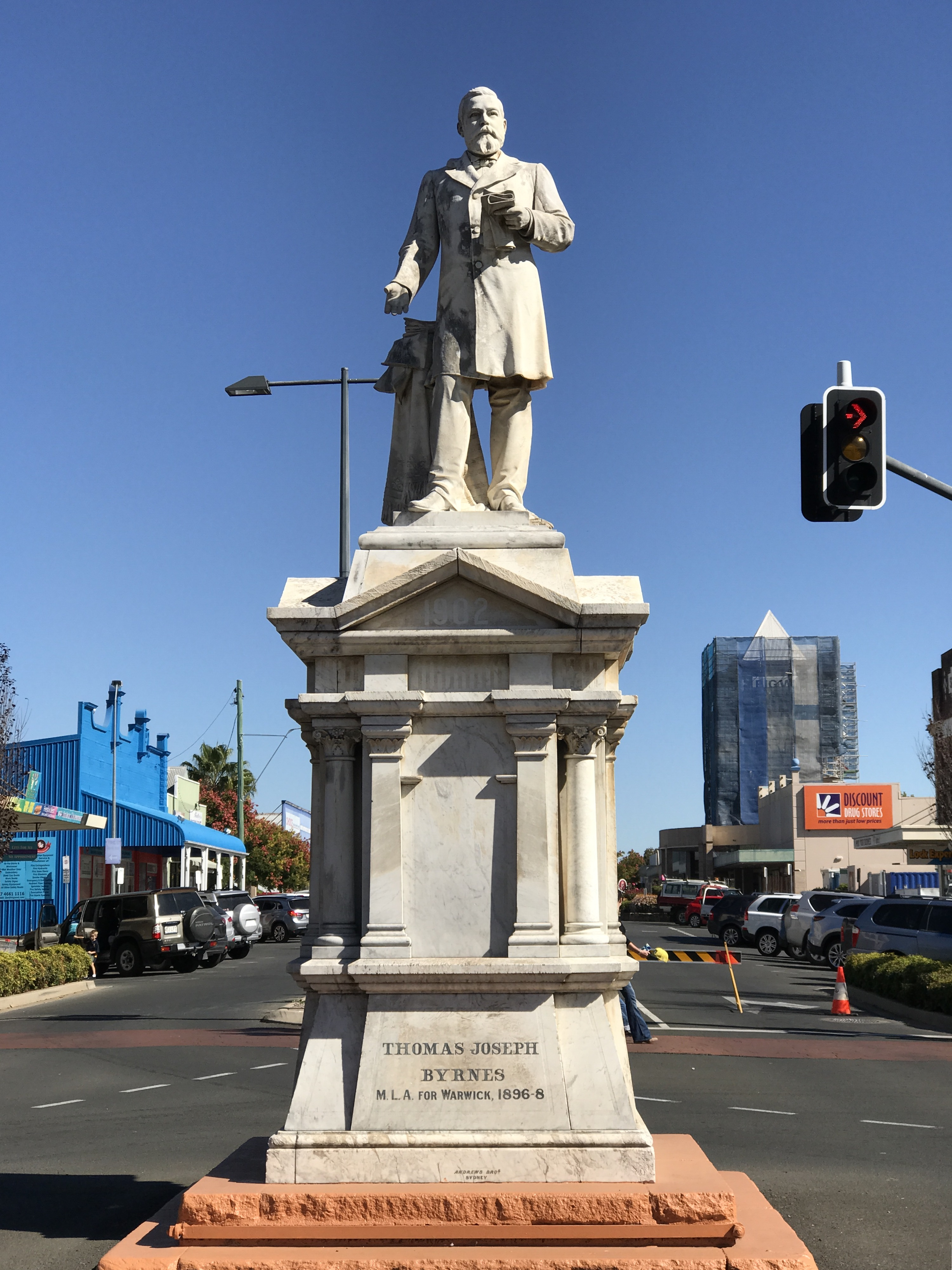
Statue of Thomas Joseph Byrnes in Warwick

== Opposition to Federation ==
Byrnes' brief five month premiership was dominated by the question of Federation. Prior to his premiership he had been an eloquent and forceful opponent of Federation. He contended that Federation was a vainglorious manoeuvre of self-seeking politicians with 'imperial' notions, which did recognise the reality of Australia as a minor power, but succumbed to 'thoughts in our mind that we are a very much larger country in the universe than we really are'. The projected Federation would only 'vainly simulate the pretensions of another smaller empire'; an Australian empire which 'aimed at unification rather than federation', and thereby stymie the development of Queensland.

Instead of the Federation that came to pass, Byrnes favoured political integration by means of the Federal Council of Australasia, an appointed body which had met biennially since 1885. At its 1897 meeting he proposed that the council's legitimacy be enhanced by the direct election, by voters, of delegates to the council. This proposal was opposed by leading Federationist members of the council, and was defeated, with 9 delegates in favour and 9 against. This effectively spelt the end of the council.

On becoming premier in April 1898, Byrnes adopted a more circumspect position on Federation. On a tour of the pro-Federation Queensland north his earlier fighting words were replaced by diffuse professions of federalism in the abstract. In July 1898 Byrnes accepted an invitation by the leader of the NSW No campaign, Jack Want, to confer with the NSW premier George Reid. What passed between the two premiers at their Sydney conference remains one of the tantalizing unknowns of the federation story. The outcome of this excursion to Sydney was catastrophic to Byrnes on another account entirely.

== Death ==
Byrnes' possibly brilliant future was cut short by contracting measles on his visit to Sydney in July 1898, which developed into pneumonia. He died on 27 September 1898. Byrnes was accorded a state funeral which proceeded from St Stephen's Cathedral to the Toowong Cemetery. Never married, he was survived by several brothers and sisters.

== Legacy ==
Byrnes is commemorated by two statues, one in Centenary Place in Brisbane and the heritage-listed T J Byrnes Monument in Warwick, both funded by public subscriptions.

The commissioning of the Brisbane statue encountered a series of setbacks. The sculptor Achille Simonetti was approached by the committee to create the statue. However, Simonetti had never seen Byrnes during his life and produced a plaster cast from photographs for the committee's approval before commencing the statue. The committee did not think the cast was sufficiently like Byrnes and there were a number of iterations before they were satisfied. Then there was an argument of whether Byrnes should be depicted in a university gown or in an ordinary frock coat, deciding on a frock coat in order to depict Byrnes as the premier rather than as a lawyer. Then as Simonetti was tendering to provide a 9-foot-tall bronze statue for £1,800, a local sculptor James Laurence Watts offered to provide the statue for only £1,000, dividing the committee. However, after Byrnes' sisters indicated their strong preference for Simonetti's work and Simonetti offered a revised tender of £1400, the committee went ahead and commissioned the statue from Simonetti. Early in 1900, the argument about the clothing erupted once more when Simonetti expressed an artistic preference for robes rather than a frock coat, and the committee reversed its decision in favour of robes. During this argument, Simonetti took ill and died. It was then announced in the newspaper that it had been Simonetti's wish that his former pupil, James White, should complete his unfinished commissions. The committee negotiated with White, but finally gave the commission to sculptor Bertram Mackennal.

The township of Byrnestown in Queensland is named after him, as is its main street Byrnes Parade and its railway station.

St Thomas's Catholic Church in Camp Hill, Brisbane (then known as East Coorparoo) built in 1923 is another memorial to Byrnes. He had owned the land on which the church was built, but it had passed to his sister Matilda Margaret Maloney after his death. In 1916 she agreed to sell the land to the Catholic Church and then, on her death in 1922, bequeathed £300 towards the cost of erecting a church in memory of her brother.

Political offices
| Preceded by Sir Hugh Nelson | Premier of Queensland; 13 April – 27 September 1898 | Succeeded by James Dickson |
Parliament of Queensland
| Preceded by Frederick Wimble | Member for Cairns; 1893–1896 | Succeeded by Isidor Lissner |
| Preceded by Arthur Morgan | Member for Warwick; 1896–1898 | Succeeded by Arthur Morgan |
