= The Cairns Post =

Newspaper in Far North Queensland, Australia

Coordinates: 16°55′20″S 145°46′41″E

- Front page, 12 February 2024
- Type: Daily newspaper
- Format: Tabloid, Berliner (Weekend Post from 2017)
- Owner: News Limited
- Editor: Siân Jeffries
- Founded: 10 May 1883
- Headquarters: Cairns
- Website: www.cairnspost.com.au

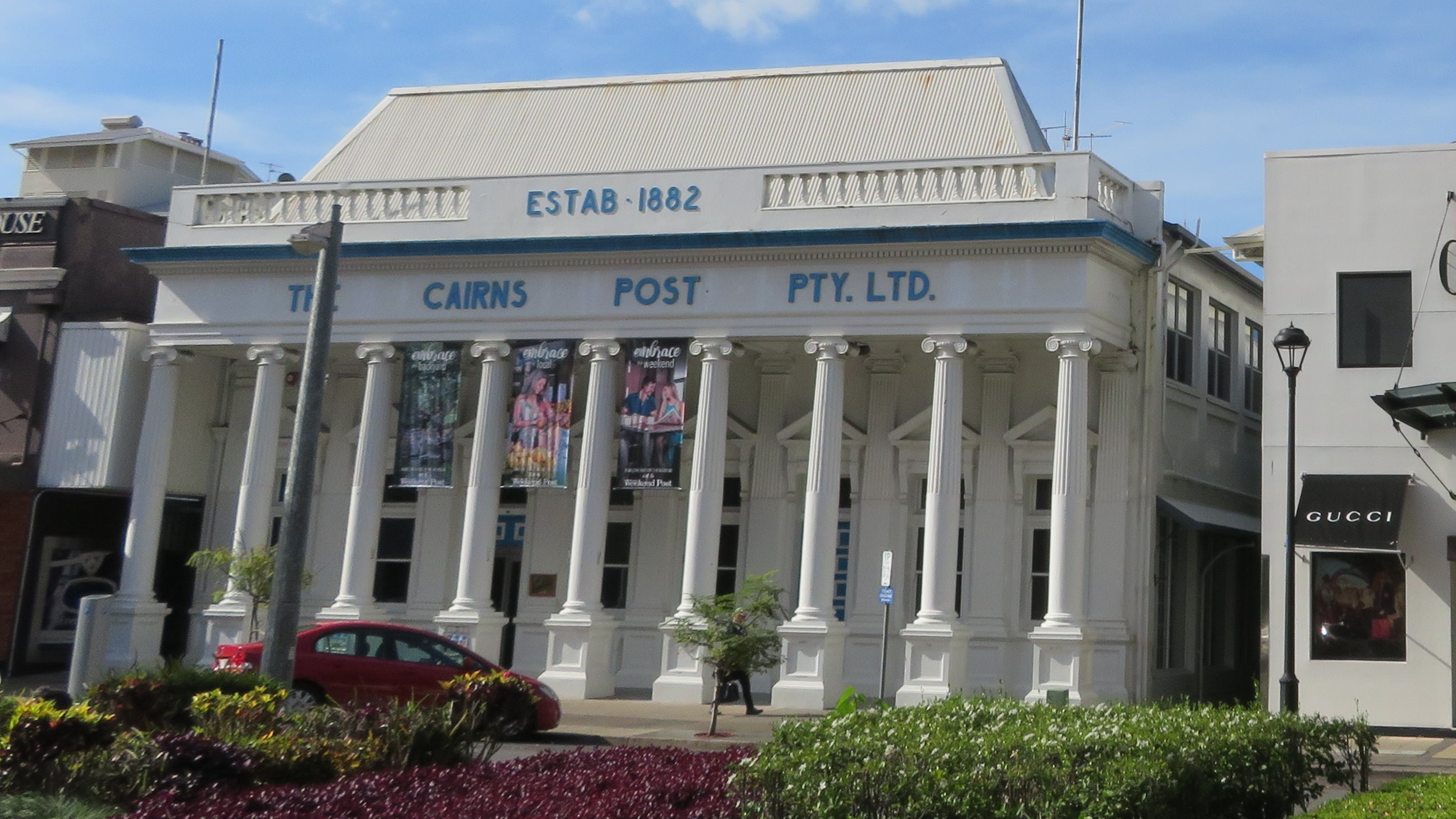
Premises of The Cairns Post on Abbott Street (2016)

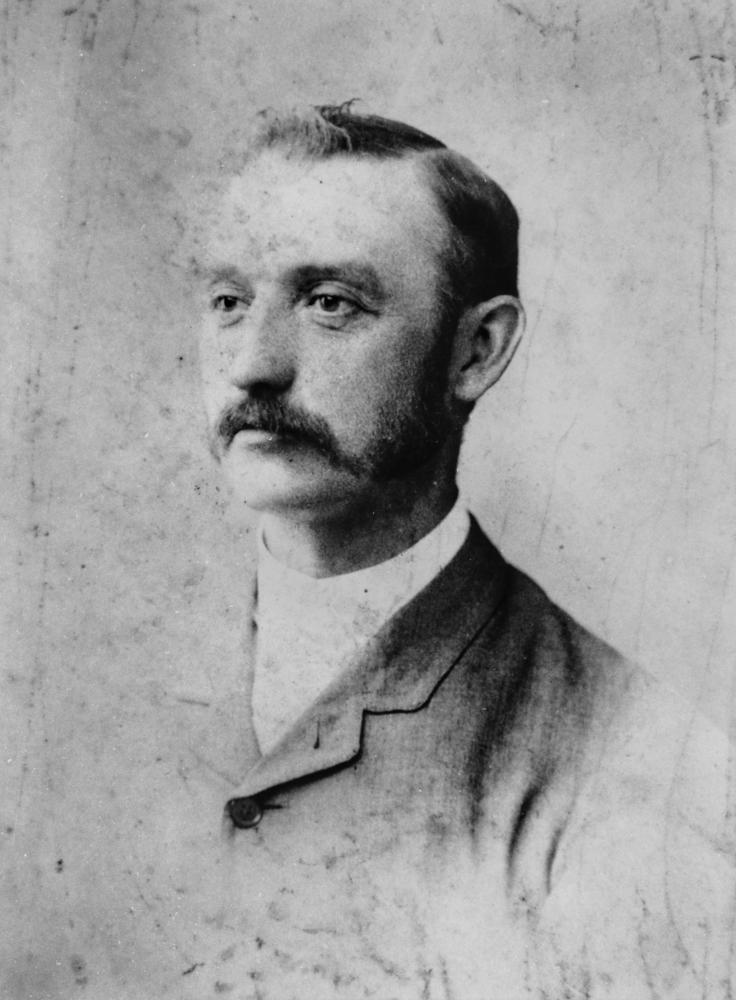
The original founder FTWimble

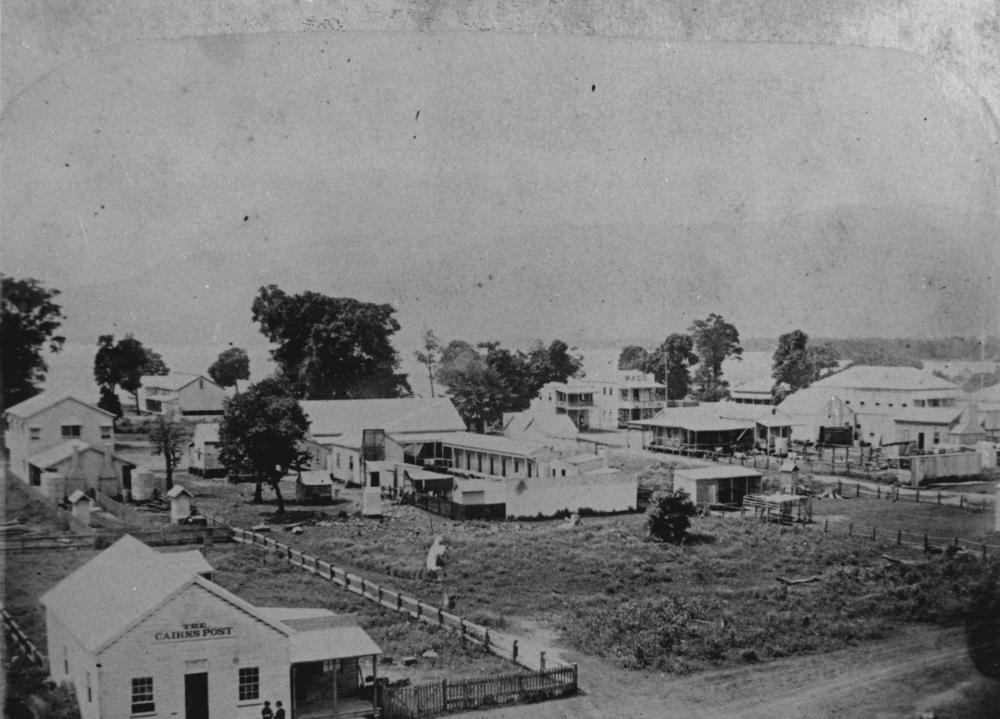
First office of the Cairns Post on Lake Street (1886)

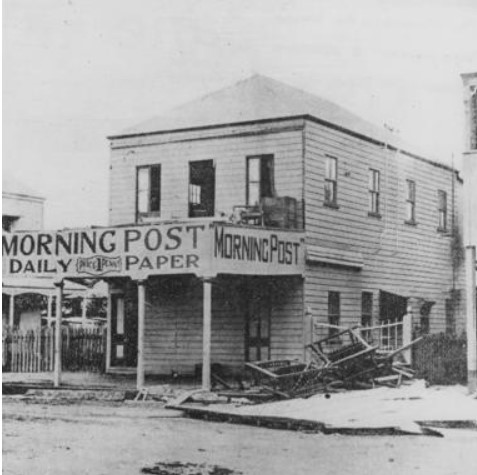
Morning Post (Cairns) - Premises after the cyclone 1906

The Cairns Post is a major News Corporation newspaper in Far North Queensland, Australia, that exclusively serves the Cairns area. It has daily coverage on local, state, national and world news, plus a wide range of sections and liftouts covering health, beauty, cars and lifestyle. The Cairns Post is published every weekday and a weekend edition which is called The Weekend Post is published on Saturdays.

It is the oldest business in Cairns and has been operating continuously for more than a century.

== History ==
The Cairns Post claims to be dating back to 1882.

=== The Cairns Post 1883 - 1893 ===
The first incarnation of a newspaper called The Cairns Post was published first on 10 May 1883 and was founded by the ink manufacturer Frederick Thomas Wimble. The son of an English second-generation ink-maker migrated as a 20-year old for health reasons to Australia. He initially stayed in Melbourne but later moved to Sydney, carrying on with ink manufacturing. In 1883 he moved to Cairns, hoping to get involved in agriculture, but soon went into establishing the Cairns Post as a weekly paper appearing Thursdays with offices on Lake Street. From May 1887 forward the paper was published twice a week, appearing Wednesdays and Saturdays.

In the economic depression following the Australian banking crisis of 1893 Wimble, who soon after his arrival in Cairns was elected alderman and in 1888 became the first member for the electoral district of Cairns in the Queensland Parliament, lost his fortune. This led also to the end of the Post. Wimble ended also his parliamentary career. He returned to Sydney "with nothing left but my good name". There he had renewed success and regained control of his former company there and published from 1906 Wimble's Reminder, which run until 1957. This left the Cairns Argus, founded in 1888 by William Graham Henderson, who initially came from Sydney to Cairns to join Wimble, as the sole newspaper in town.

=== Founding of the Morning Post in 1895 ===
Today's Post dates back to 1895 when Edwin "Hoppy" Charles Mollet Draper founded as head of E. Draper & Co. the Morning Post as a weekly publication. He was born in 1861 to a prominent family in Williamstown, Victoria. After he bankrupted a small provincial paper he traveled Victoria as an insurance salesman. Later he followed his younger brother Alexander Frederick John "AJ" Draper (b. 1863 in Williamstown, d. 1928 in Cairns) to Cairns. AJ Draper started initially a career with the Bank of Australasia which took him through rural Victoria and New South Wales. After being sent to Townsville he moved to Cairns in 1885 where he became involved in numerous business interests and also filled the position of mayor for several stints between 1891 and 1927. In January 1885 he founded together with WD Hobson the Cairns Chronicle which evolved into a "rabid tabloid" style paper. In May 1886 he appointed Edwin as editor of the publication. Later that year libelous remarks led to a horsewhipping of Edwin Draper by the Cairns Post publisher FT Wimble. AJ Draper lost control of the scandal-plagued Chronicle as a consequence of the 1893 economic crisis.

Edwin had to give up his position in 1898 due to a “serious illness” and he died in 1901 in Cairns. After his death it was found out, that thePost was actually held in the name of AJ Draper's wife Georgina. In August 1900 the paper became biweekly and four years later it became a daily paper.

In December 1907 the paper became The Cairns Morning Post and in July 1909 it was renamed The Cairns Post. The Drapers were fiercely opposed to the labour movement. This triggered the foundation of the Cairns Times in 1900, which was later taken over directly by the unions. After taking over the Cairns Argus in 1918 it became a daily newspaper, the Daily Times, which eventually was taken over by the Post in 1935 and incorporated with the weekly Northern Herald, which itself was a spun off by the Post in 1913.

=== Takeovers: Queensland Press in 1966 and Murdoch in 1987 ===
After the death of AJ Draper in 1928 the Post remained in the hands of the Draper family until 1965, when Queensland Press Ltd bought the company. Queensland Press was also the largest shareholder of the Melbourne based publisher the Herald & Weekly Times (HWT) which was targeted for a takeover by Rupert Murdoch in the course of the big media shake-up of 1986/87. In the end, after some major assets of HWT were separated out to Murdoch's rival Robert Holmes à Court Murdoch acquired Queensland Press in January 1987 via his family company Cruden Investments for $700 million.

== Premises on Abbott Street ==
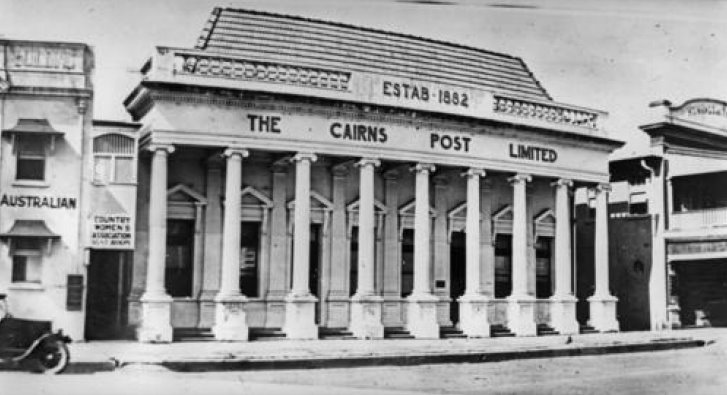
Cairns Post - Premises 1930

The first stage of the Cairns Post building on 22–24 Abbott Street with its classical colonnade in the inter-war Academic Classical style was built in 1908 and was designed by Harvey Draper (1869–1921), who was another of the Draper brothers. He was one of the most prolific architect of Cairns in that era. He also designed the Adelaide Steamship Company’s Offices in Cairns (1910), the Jack and Newell Store (1911), the Palace Theatre (1913), the Howard Smith Building (1914), the Cairns Ambulance Station (1921), and St. Saviour's Church (Kuranda, 1915) as well as buildings interstate.

The Post building initially comprised the left three bays. Five more bays were added in 1924.

== Digitisation ==
The paper has been digitised as part of the Australian Newspapers Digitisation Program of the National Library of Australia. Digitised copies are freely available online for the periods of 1884 to 1893 and 1909 to 1954.

== See also ==
- List of newspapers in Australia
