= Frederick Wimble =

Australian politician

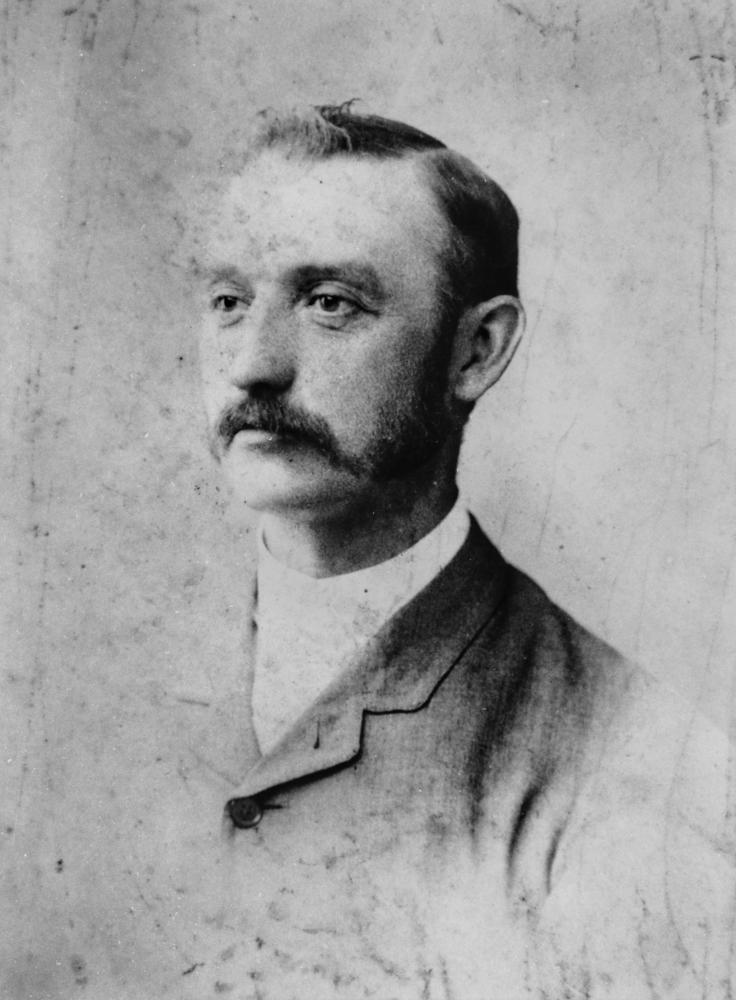

Member of the Queensland Legislative Assembly for Cairns
- In office 5 May 1888 – 29 April 1893
- Preceded by: New seat
- Succeeded by: Thomas Joseph Byrnes

Personal details
- Born: Frederick Thomas Wimble; 28 November 1846 London, England
- Died: 3 January 1936 (aged 89) Artarmon, Sydney, Australia
- Occupation: Businessman, Newspaper owner

Frederick Thomas Wimble (28 November 1846 – 3 January 1936) was an Australian printer and pioneer ink manufacturer and later a publisher and member of the Legislative Assembly of Queensland representing the Electoral district of Cairns.

== Biography ==
Wimble was born 28 November 1846 at Clerkenwell, London, the thirteenth child (and one of two sons) of Benjamin Wimble and his wife Elizabeth. Benjamin Wimble had pioneered coloured printing ink in England, creating the first supply of red ink to Cambridge University Press.

At 21, Wimble travelled to Austria. Suffering poor health, his doctor then suggested a sea voyage and his father paid for him to travel to Australia. He arrived in Melbourne in July 1867. Wimble wrote to his father suggesting a new market for printers inks in Australia and his father replied by sending fresh supplies and his recipes as well as an ink mill, steam engine and other equipment.

Wimble produced his first ink on 4 May 1868 and in doing do claimed that the Melbourne Star newspaper was the first to have been published in Australia with locally manufactured ink. The following year he gained contracts in other states by supplying ink for the printing of South Australian postage stamps.

On 13 March 1872 he married Harriett Gascoigne, a widow with two children. There were to be three children of the marriage, which ended in divorce. Between 1876 and 1878 he traveled to the United States of America and Britain in an effort to secure new printing contracts and when he returned to Australia he moved his company to Sydney, settling on premises at 87 Clarence Street.

By 1883, Wimble had had enough of the printing business and moved to Queensland hoping to become a "sugar baron". He bought land in the area but soon returned to printing as founder of the Cairns Post. In 1885 he was elected as an alderman to his local council. He reportedly spent £7000 on a campaign to be elected to the Legislative Assembly of Queensland seat of Cairns and was elected on 5 May 1888, beating Richard Kingsford.

On 16 August 1890, during his term in office, he married Marian Sarah Benjamin. They had three children and they remained married until her death in 1933. He served as a member of the Legislative Assembly until 1893 when he stood down and was replaced by future Premier of Queensland, Thomas Joseph Byrnes. He returned to printing and publishing with the production of Wimble's Reminder; as much a catalog as a magazine which ran from 1895 (as Wimble's Monthly Reminder) until 1957 (well after his death).

Wimble's Reminder soon became a model of the printer's art, in layout and typography as well as print quality. It contained technical articles on printing and bookbinding, interspersed with commercial information on the company's products, latest arrivals and recommendations, and sometimes humour. It ran articles on newspapers and printshops that had made significant achievements or were worthy of emulation. It helped Sydney, and New South Wales generally, gain a reputation for printing quality as good as anywhere in the world.

Wimble was an active Freemason and a member of the United Grand Lodge of New South Wales.

In 1924 he published an autobiography, Climbing the Ladder.

Wimble died on 3 January 1936 in Artarmon, Sydney.

Parliament of Queensland
| New seat | Member for Cairns; 1888–1893 | Succeeded by Thomas Joseph Byrnes |
