= Centenary Place =

Heritage-listed park in Brisbane, Queensland

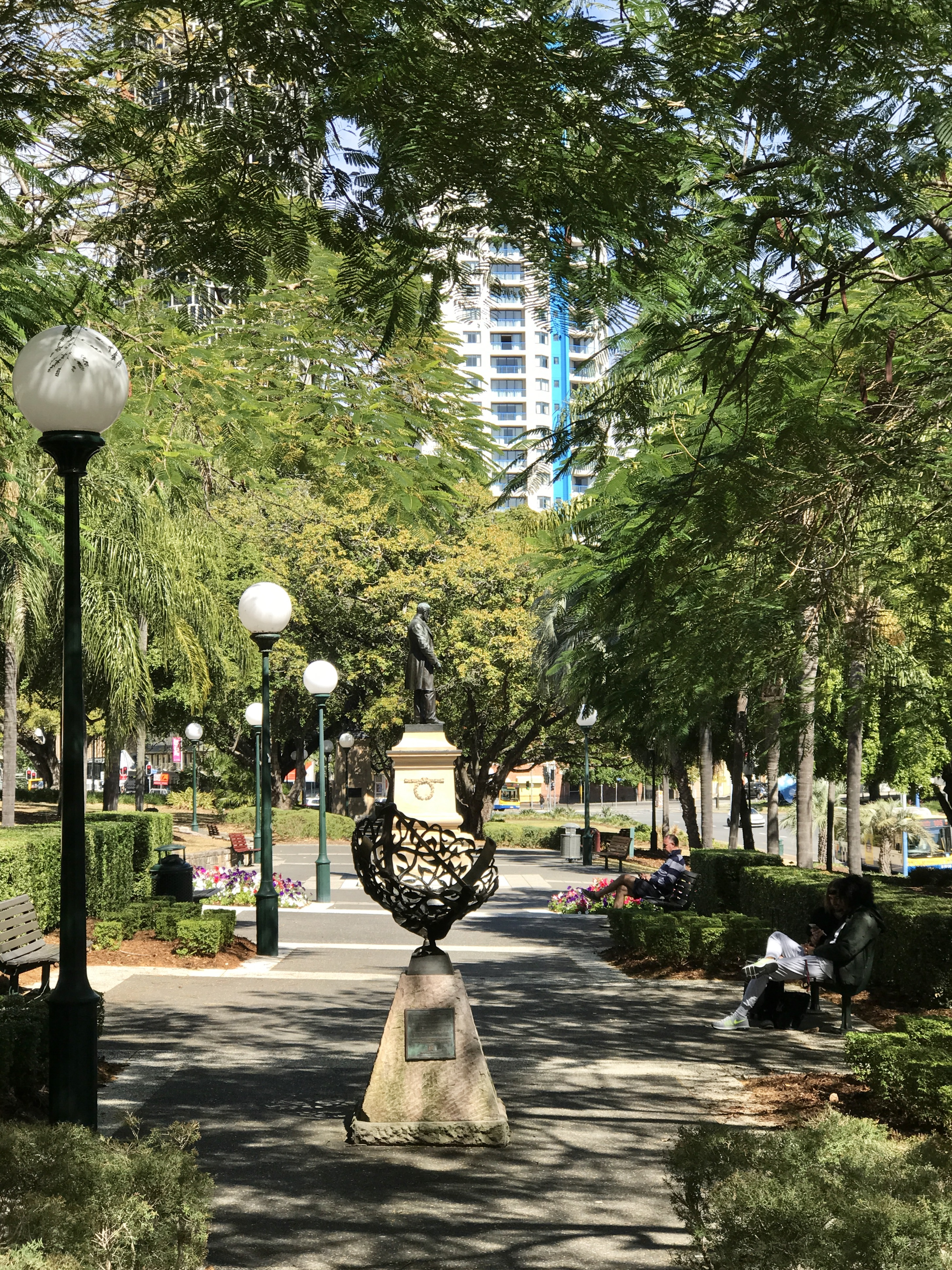
- Centenary Place, Brisbane

- Location within Queensland Location within Australia
- 27.461°S 153.0319°E
- Location: 85 Wickham Street, Fortitude Valley, City of Brisbane, Queensland, Australia

History
- Built for: Brisbane City Council

Site notes
- Architect: Henry Moore
- Owner: Brisbane City Council

Queensland Heritage Register
- Official name: Centenary Place, Centenary Park
- Type: state heritage (landscape)
- Designated: 6 August 2007
- Reference no.: 602442
- Significant period: 1920s (fabric); 1920s–ongoing (historical use)

Centenary Place is a heritage-listed park at 85 Wickham Street, Fortitude Valley, City of Brisbane, Queensland, Australia. It is also known by some as Centenary Park even though this is not the name it was given at the ceremonial dedication. It was designed by Henry Moore. It was added to the Queensland Heritage Register on 6 August 2007.

== History ==
Centenary Place was designed and constructed for the purpose of commemorating the centenary of European settlement in Queensland (1824–1924). The council began clearing of the land of existing buildings in 1924 and the park was formed in 1925. It covers an area of 8,748 square metres and is bounded by Wickham Street, Ann Street and Gotha Street, Fortitude Valley. The park was one of the last civic projects undertaken by the former Brisbane City Council prior to the formation of the Greater Brisbane Council in 1925. The park has been in continual use by the public since its creation and was extensively refurbished in 1999/2000.

Celebrating the centenary of European settlement in Queensland was an important milestone in the state's history, and presented an opportunity to demonstrate how far it had progressed in 100 years. From its beginnings as a penal colony, followed by the arrival of free settlers, separation from New South Wales, Federation and the First World War, Queensland had experienced many events in its first 100 years worthy of commemoration and celebration. The creation of Centenary Place provided the public with a means of doing this.

To advance the centenary celebrations, a Centenary Celebrations Committee was formed as was a Centenary Fund. Many fundraising events were held by the Centenary Celebrations Committee and all proceeds from these events were devoted to the Centenary Fund to go towards the provision of centenary memorials, including Centenary Place. Other commemorative memorials and events included the minting of commemorative medals, a statue of John Oxley, the founding of the John Oxley Library which included the purchase of some 6000 books and numerous tree planting ceremonies across Brisbane.

The Catholic Church took great interest in the development of Centenary Place, sensing an opportunity to promote their vision of a new cathedral and envisaging the site as the forecourt for the proposed Holy Name Cathedral, a massive "Renaissance basilica" that was to occupy the block bounded by Gotha, Ann, Gipps and Wickham Streets. Although the park was designed by Henry Moore, the Parks Superintendent for Council, given the layout, which is still intact, includes a central path originally designed to lead to the proposed cathedral entrance, it is possible that Archbishop James Duhig and the cathedral architect, Jack Hennessy, junior contributed to the design.

Other features were added to the park at later dates with the drawings for the podium, archway and tramways office dated 1928. Centenary Place was designed by Moore, who was also responsible for designing New Farm Park and Newstead Park. He employed a formal design with defined layouts, planted garden beds, grassed areas, low sandstone retaining walls and curved paths. The garden includes mature specimens of poinciana (Delonix regia), Canary Island date palms (Phoenix canariensis), queen palms (Syagrus romanzoffiana), wine palms (Butia capitata) and fig trees including, weeping figs (Ficus benjamina) and white figs (Ficus virens). In 1947 Harry Oakman, the Council Parks & Gardens Director, planned additional garden beds along the walks in the fig and poinciana avenues. These proposals were largely in place by 1950.

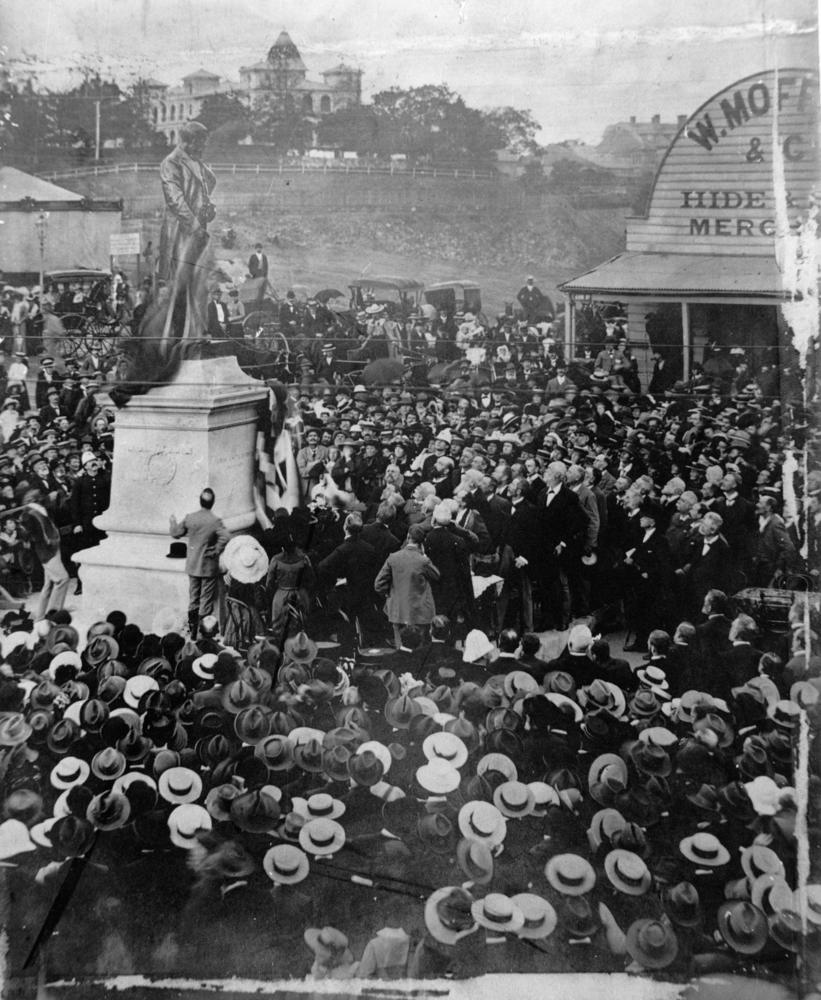
Unveiling of the T. J. Byrnes statue, Petrie Bight, 1902

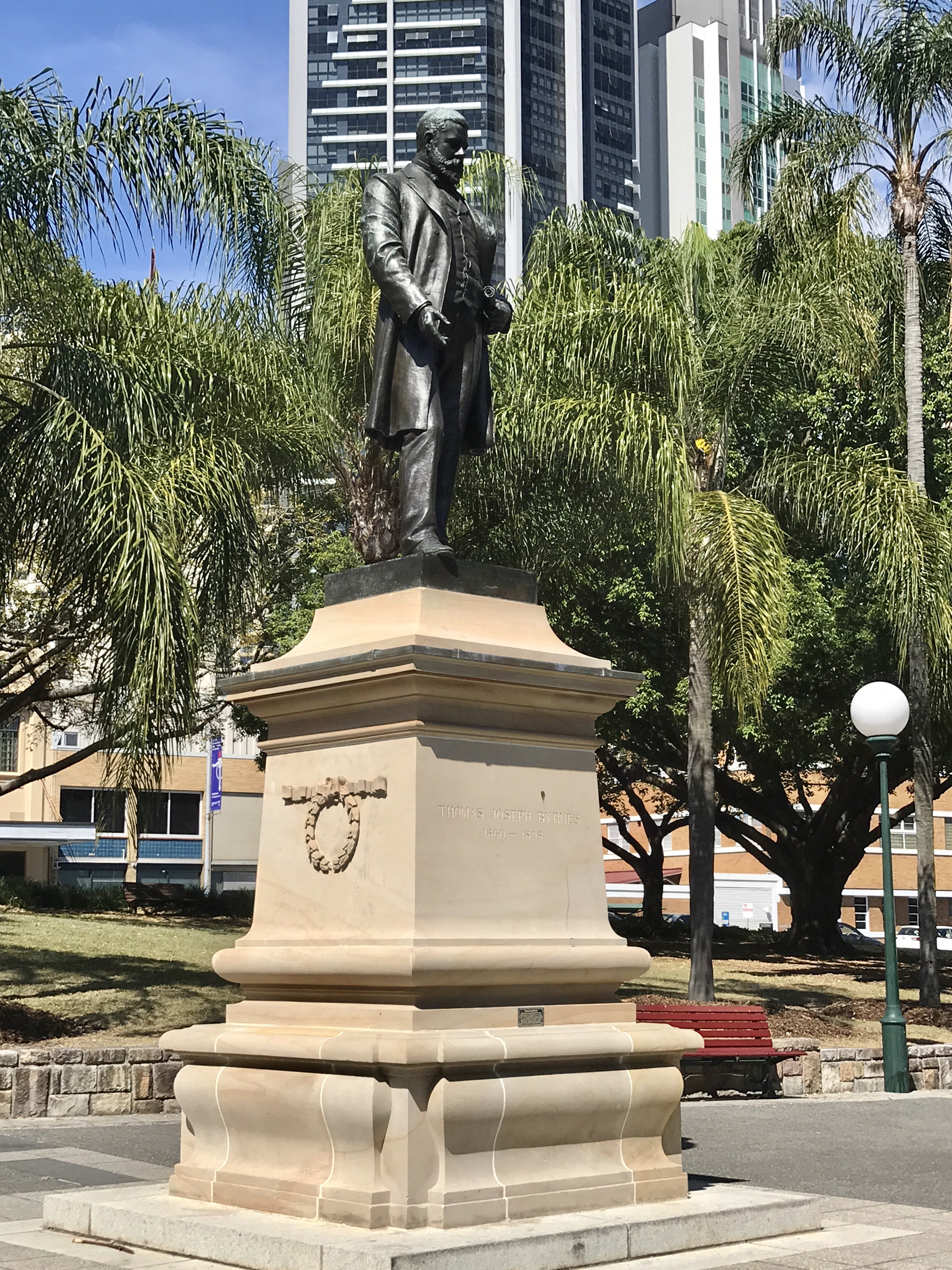
T. J. Byrnes status in Centenary Place, 2017

The original design of the park specifically allocated space to accommodate a statue of Thomas Joseph Byrnes, a former Premier of Queensland. Byrnes was both the first Queensland-born premier and first Roman Catholic premier. The statue, by renowned sculptor, Sir Bertram Mackennal, is believed to be one of Brisbane's earliest and was originally erected at Petrie Bight, at the junction of Wickham and Boundary Streets in 1902. It was originally commissioned from sculptor Achille Simonetti, but he died without completing it. When the park was completed in 1925, the statue was moved from Petrie Bight to its new location. Another statue of Byrnes (the T J Byrnes Monument) was erected at Warwick.

A statue of the Scottish bard, Robert Burns, was proposed for Brisbane as early as 1888 when the President of the Burns Club, Alderman William McNaughton Galloway, contacted the President of the Queensland Scottish Association, Sir Thomas McIlwraith, to suggest their organisations combined forces and funds to commission the statue. However, the Scottish community had to wait many years before seeing their dream realised as it was not until 1929 that a statue of Robert Burns was commissioned by the Brisbane Caledonian Society and Burns Club and installed on a pedestal provided by the council. Traditionally, statues of Robert Burns are placed so that the poet's back is turned on the church. The statue of Burns in the park has been positioned in accordance to this tradition and had the Holy Name Cathedral been built, the poet's back would have been turned on it. The statue of Burns has served as a focal point for gatherings and events, such as the Burns Night, for the Scottish community of Brisbane since its installation in the park.

From 1962 to the mid 1970s, Centenary Place was Brisbane's designated people's forum or speaker's corner. Sunday afternoons became a regular event in Brisbane with hundreds of people turning up to hear speakers holding forth on all manner of issues including speakers campaigning for Aboriginal rights in the 1960s and 1970s. After the people's forum ceased at Centenary Place, the people of Brisbane had to wait until 1990 before a new location was officially made available by the Brisbane City Council at King George Square.

Over the years the park has undergone numerous changes. In 1938, a tram waiting shelter was built onto the Wickham Street side of the archway podium and tramways office. The park also featured two air raid shelters, one each on the Ann and Wickham Street frontages. Similar shelters (e.g. Albert Park (North) air raid shelter) were constructed at many inner city sites in the early 1940s as part of Queensland's wartime defences. In 1961, the Council prepared plans to convert the Wickham Street air raid shelter into a toilet block. These were evidently demolished by the time the Council planned the construction of a new toilet block in 1973. This entailed the demolition of the remaining air raid shelter on Ann Street. In 1977 the park was extended towards Wickham Street at the entry podium area and the edge trimmed around Gotha Street. The park underwent extensive refurbishment in 1999–2000 carried out by Belt Collins Landscape Architects which restored the original formality of the park.

== Description ==
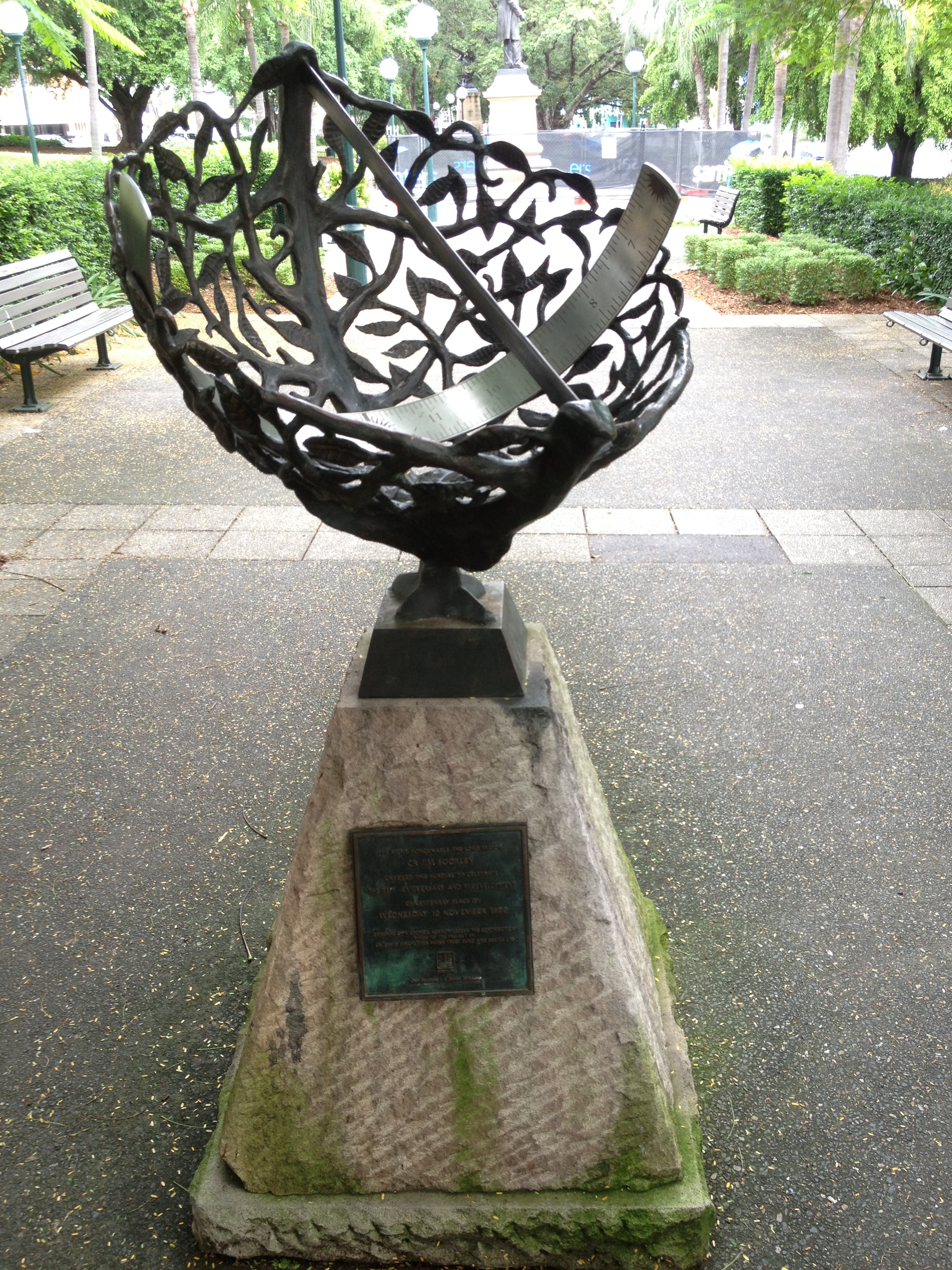
Sundial, 2013

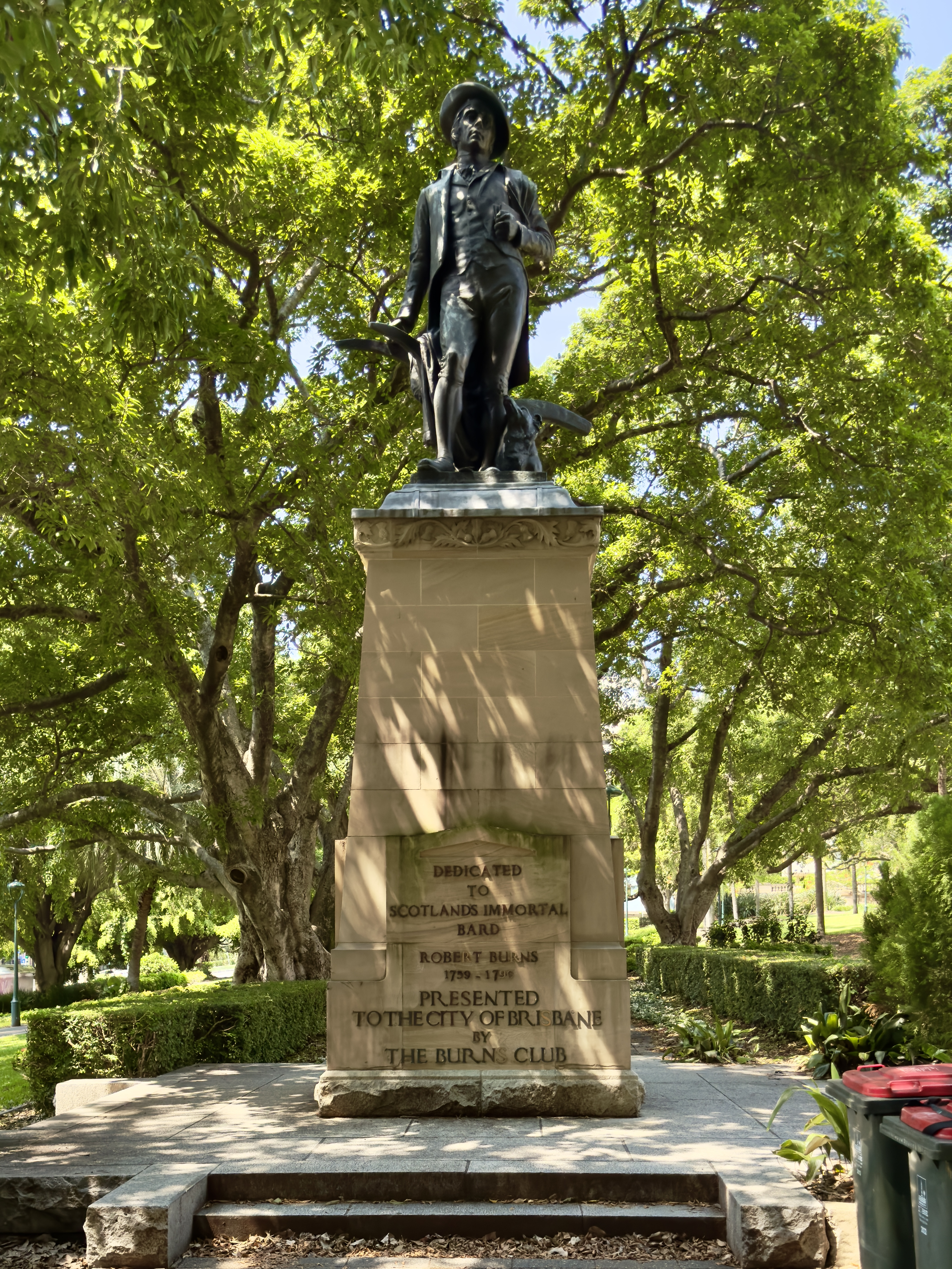
Robert Burns Memorial, 2023

Centenary Place is a teardrop-shaped park bounded by Ann, Wickham and Gotha Streets. The park falls gently from the corner of Ann and Gotha Streets and is bisected along its length by a processional path, starting with a ceremonial archway at the narrow southern end of the park. This path is the formal spine of the park, reinforced by avenues of trees with a series of monuments providing focal points along its length. At the park's centre is the statue of Thomas Joseph Byrnes, former Premier of Queensland. The statue occupies a large paved area formed by the convergence of the central path. Curved paths leading to the centre of the park from Ann and Wickham Streets are mirrored on either side of it.

Between Byrnes and the archway, the central path passes through a shaded avenue of mature fig trees and a monument to the Scottish poet Robert Burns. At the northern or Gotha Street end of the park, the central path accommodates a 1999 sundial sculpture commemorating the 75th anniversary of Centenary Place.

Grassed areas are delineated by formal paths, mulched garden beds, hedges and several regular lines of trees. These significant mature trees include poincianas (Delonix regia), weeping figs (Ficus benjamina), white figs (Ficus virens), Canary Island date palms (Phoenix canariensis), queen palms (Syagrus romanzoffiana) and wine palms (Butia capitata). The overall visual effect is a well developed formal tropical landscape character.

Sandstone park signage walls have been erected on each of the Wickham and Ann Street frontages.

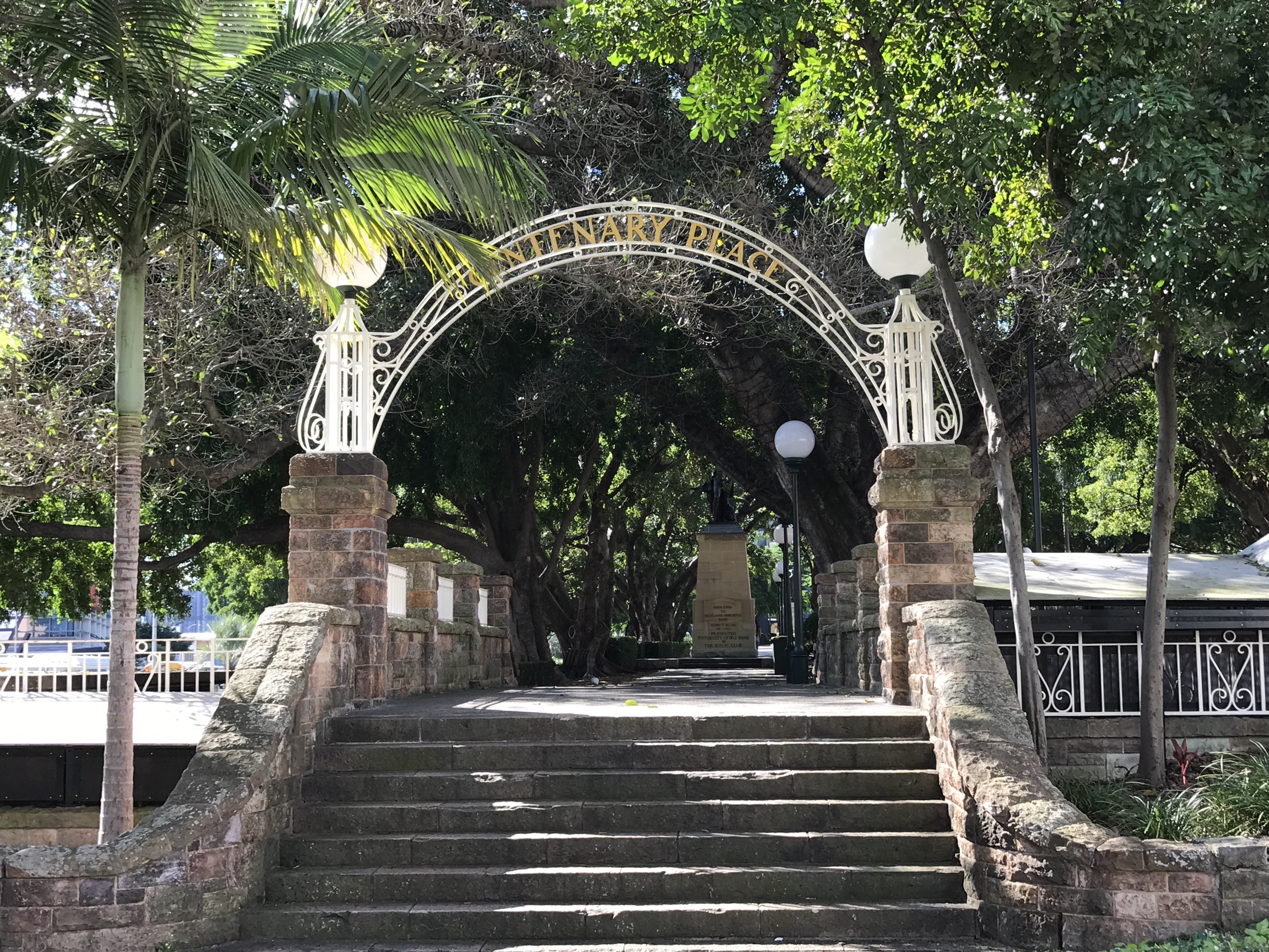
Gateway

At the city or southern end of the park, a formal stone podium, incorporating stone steps and the arched gateway, leads into the central path. The gateway is formed by opposing Brisbane Tuff piers surmounted by a wrought iron archway.

The ironwork incorporates the lettering "Centenary Place" and supports for the spherical glass lanterns on each side. The podium forms the roof of what was variously a tramways cash office and lost property office, and is now an automated traffic signal control centre. Access to this basement area is provided by two steep, narrow concrete stairs bounded by Brisbane Tuff retaining walls. The stairs on the western or Wickham Street side are protected by a simple, compressed fibre cement canopy erected in 2000. The Brisbane Tuff loggia on the western side of the podium was erected as a tramway shelter in 1938.

The bronze figure of Robert Burns stands on a tapered dressed sandstone pedestal with a rusticated granite base and thistle- patterned cornice. Three faces of the plinth feature bronze bas- reliefs. The fourth face features the statue's inscription in applied bronze letters.

The Byrnes statue is also bronze and supported on a sandstone pedestal. When Centenary Place was constructed in 1924, the statue was moved to its present position in the park. The pedestal features an elaborate base and cornice. A carved sandstone wreath decorates the north and south faces of the pedestal. The west face features a worn inscription of Byrnes' name and dates of birth and death. Mounted on the base of the statue is a small plaque bearing a brief description of Byrnes and the statue. This plaque incorrectly credits the sculptor of the statue as being "Sir Bertram Macenell". The statue was actually sculpted by renowned artist, "Sir Bertram Mackennal" and is noted as being Mackennal's fiftieth sculpture.

The strength of the central path as an axial feature has been diminished by the loss of its relationship with the stone remnants of the Holy Name Cathedral site. Thus the northern end of the central path lacks the strong foci provided elsewhere by the archway and the two statues.

== Heritage listing ==
Centenary Place was listed on the Queensland Heritage Register on 6 August 2007 having satisfied the following criteria.

The place is important in demonstrating the evolution or pattern of Queensland's history.

Centenary Place, established in 1925, is important as Brisbane City Council's principal contribution to the celebration of the 1924 centenary of European settlement in Queensland and Queensland's growth and development during this time from a penal colony to a state. It is also important as the site of a public forum or speaker's corner during the 1960s and 1970s when political activism was increasing and public speaking spaces were used to promote public awareness of both national and local issues. The increasing importance of open spaces in urban areas is also demonstrated through the changing land use of Centenary Place from urban development to parkland.

The place demonstrates rare, uncommon or endangered aspects of Queensland's cultural heritage.

Centenary Place has an uncommon structure built from Brisbane Tuff which displays both ceremonial and utilitarian functions by combining the formal commemorative steps and archway with a tramway office and passenger shelter.

The place is important in demonstrating the principal characteristics of a particular class of cultural places.

Centenary Place has strong association with the works of horticulturalist and landscape gardener Henry Moore, who was the first Brisbane City Parks Superintendent (1912–1925). His design work in Brisbane includes New Farm Park and Newstead Park. It is also associated with Harry Oakman, Parks Superintendent for the Brisbane City Council (1948–1963), who was the first purpose-trained landscape architect to be employed by a government in Queensland.

The place is important because of its aesthetic significance.

Centenary Place is aesthetically important for its formal stone stepped arched gateway with opposing piers with a wrought iron archway which leads into the processional pathway that extends through the park. The park contains avenues of mature specimens of poinciana (Delonix regia), Canary Island date palms (Phoenix canariensis), queen palms (Syagrus romanzoffiana), wine palms (Butia capitata) and fig trees including weeping figs (Ficus benjamina) and white figs (Ficus virens).

The place has a strong or special association with a particular community or cultural group for social, cultural or spiritual reasons.

Centenary Place has a strong association with the Catholic community as evidenced by its selection as the forecourt for the proposed Holy Name Cathedral and placement of the statue of a prominent Catholic, former Queensland premier Thomas Joseph Byrnes. It also has strong association with the Scottish community as evidenced by their selection of the park to house the statue commissioned of Scottish bard Robert Burns and by their use of the park to hold events such as the Burns Night.
