= Northern Herald =

Newspaper published in Cairns, Queensland

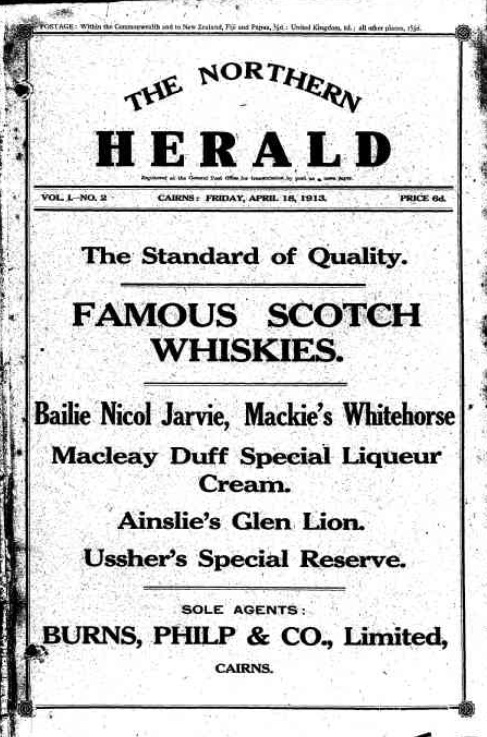
Front page of the Northern Herald, 18 April 1913

The Northern Herald was a weekly newspaper published in Cairns, Queensland between 1913 and 1939. It was published Fridays.

The paper was published by the Cairns Post from 11 April 1913 to 30 December 1939. It was distributed from the Cairns region all the way up the Cape York Peninsula. After the Cairns Post took over the Cairns Daily Times in December 1935 the Herald incorporated the Daily Times. In December 1939 the publication of the Northern Herald ceased after a run of 1346 editions.

== Digitisation ==
The paper has been digitised as part of the Australian Newspapers Digitisation Program of the National Library of Australia.
