= Robert Alexander Chermside =

Sir Robert Alexander Chermside, KH, FRCP (1792 – 8 September 1860) was a British physician.

Chermside was born in Dublin, the son of surgeon Robert Alexander Chermside and Annie Price Pooley. In 1810, he entered the medical service of the British Army as assistant-surgeon of the 7th Hussars, served in France, Spain, Flanders and was present at the Battle of Waterloo. Immediately after Waterloo, he was promoted to surgeon of the 10th Hussars. In 1821, he was admitted as a licentiate of the Royal College of Physicians and later elected a Fellow in 1836. In 1817, he graduated MD at the University of Edinburgh and was a member of the Royal College of Surgeons of Edinburgh and London and the Société de Médecine Pratique in Paris. He was sometime Physician Extraordinary to the Duchess of Kent and Physician to the British Embassy at Paris.

In recognition of his war services, Chermside was appointed Knight of the Royal Guelphic Order in 1831 and made a Knight Bachelor in 1835. He was also appointed a Knight of the Order of St John, a Knight of the Order of the Red Eagle and a Chevalier of the Legion of Honour. He died at his home in Oxford on 8 September 1860. His grandson was the British Army officer Herbert Chermside.
