= Herbert Chermside =

British Army general

Lieutenant-General Sir Herbert Chermside GCMG CB
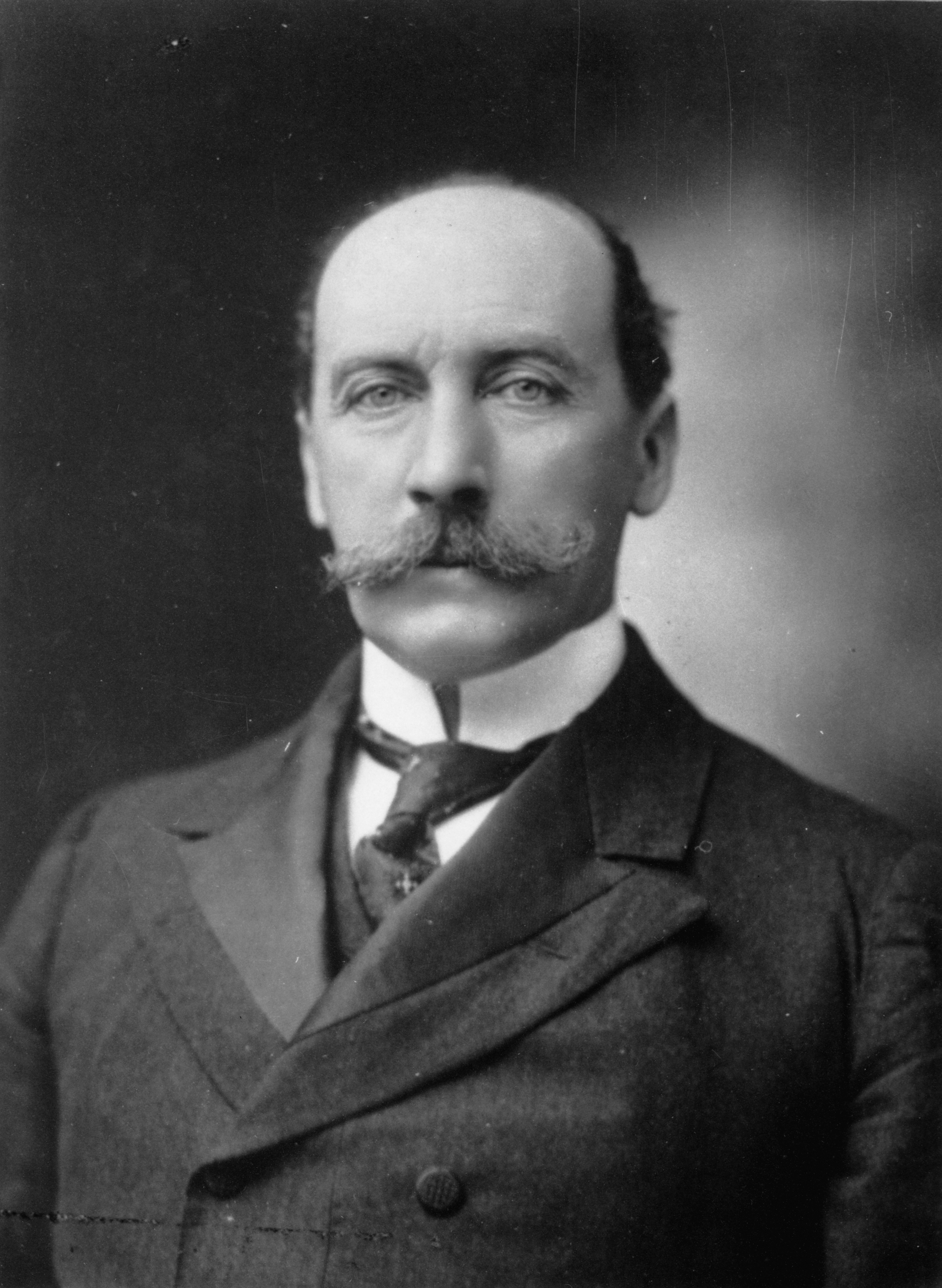

9th Governor of Queensland
- In office 24 March 1902 – 10 October 1904
- Monarch: Edward VII
- Preceded by: The Lord Lamington
- Succeeded by: The Lord Chelmsford

Personal details
- Born: 31 July 1850 Wilton, Wiltshire, England
- Died: 24 September 1929 (aged 79) London, England
- Spouse(s): Geraldine Katharine Webb (1899–1910); Clementine Maria Reuter (from 1920)

Military service
- Allegiance: United Kingdom
- Branch/service: British Army
- Years of service: 1870–1907
- Rank: Lieutenant-General
- Commands: 3rd Division; 14th Brigade; Curragh Camp
- Battles/wars: Mahdist War; Suakin Expedition; Second Boer War
- Awards: Knight Grand Cross of the Order of St Michael and St George; Companion of the Order of the Bath

Lieutenant-General Sir Herbert Charles Chermside, GCMG, CB (31 July 1850 – 24 September 1929) was a British Army officer who served as Governor of Queensland from 1902 to 1904.

== Early life and education ==
Chermside was born in the town of Wilton in Wiltshire on 31 July 1850. His parents were Rev. Richard Seymour Conway Chermside, rector of Wilton and son of Sir Robert Alexander Chermside, and Emily Dawson. He was a scholar at Eton College and then attended the Royal Military Academy, Woolwich, where he graduated at the top of his year and was commissioned in the Royal Engineers in 1870.

== Military career ==
In 1871, Chermside and several other officers visited Paris during the Paris Commune, and were accused of supporting the Communards, narrowly escaping execution. After a posting in Ireland, he joined Benjamin Leigh Smith's expedition to the Arctic in 1873.

In 1876, Chermside was sent to Ottoman Turkey to work with the Turkish forces after Serbia and Montenegro declared war on the country in July. He was working as a military attaché to Turkey in 1877, when Russia also declared war. After six months with the Turkish boundary commission, he was appointed Military Vice Consul to Anatolia in July 1879.

In 1882, Chermside was promoted to captain, and appointed to the British Army's intelligence staff in Egypt. He was given command of the Egyptian Army's 1st Battalion by the army's Sirdar, Evelyn Wood, and spent four years in Egypt where he took part in the Suakin Expedition of 1884, against Muhammad Ahmad's Mahdist forces and served as governor-general of the Red Sea littoral. He was transferred to Wadi Halfa in October 1886, and spent the next two years repelling Mahdist incursions at Sarras.

Although still a captain in the Royal Engineers, Chermside was brevetted major in 1883, lieutenant-colonel in 1884 and colonel in 1887. In 1888 he returned to consular duties, spending a year in Kurdistan and seven years as military attaché to Constantinople. He then was assigned to reorganise the gendarmerie of the newly-autonomous Cretan State, later taking command of the British troops there and serving as military commissioner from 1896.

In 1899 Chermside returned to Britain, but was soon sent to South Africa to take part in the Second Boer War, commanding the 14th Brigade. From April 1900 he took command of the 3rd Division. He was back in the United Kingdom to take up command of the Curragh Camp in Ireland from January 1901. In January the following year he was, however, appointed the first post-Federation Governor of Queensland.

== Governor of Queensland ==
Chermside arrived in Australia in early March 1902, landing in Fremantle. On arrival he stated to local reporters that one of the first matters to which the Australian Commonwealth should attend, was the formation of a military college. He arrived in Brisbane on 24 March 1902 to find Queensland in the grip of a drought and economic recession. He immediately volunteered to forgo 15 per cent of his vice-regal salary, and his sacrifice and approachable nature made him a popular figure amongst the Queensland public. However, concerned by the parliamentary attitude to the role of governor, Chermside decided to resign in 1904, although he delayed the announcement until a political crisis had been dealt with by granting a dissolution of parliament to Premier Sir Arthur Morgan after several failed attempts to establish a stable government. Once he had opened the new parliament, Chermside announced his retirement and left Queensland on 8 October on pre-retirement leave.

== Family and later life ==
Chermside was the second son of the rector of Wilton, Reverend Richard Seymour Conway Chermside, and his wife, Emily Dawson. His paternal grandfather was the military surgeon Sir Robert Chermside.

Chermside was married twice. His first marriage was in 1899 to Geraldine Katherine Webb, daughter of W. F. Webb, of Newstead Abbey, Nottinghamshire. They had a stillborn son on 9 October 1902 in Brisbane, and she childless died in 1910. He remarried in 1920 to Clementine Maria de Reuter (b.27 August 1855), widow of Swedish diplomat Count Otto Stenbock (d.1915), and daughter of Baron Paul Reuter and Ida Clementina Magnus, and there were no children of the marriage.

Chermside retired from the British Army in February 1907 at the honorary rank of lieutenant-general.

He died in London, aged 79, on 24 September 1929.

== Honours and legacy ==
Chermside was made a Companion of the Order of the Bath in 1886. He was also made a Companion of the Order of St Michael and St George in 1880, upgraded to Knight Commander of the Order of St Michael and St George in 1897, and Knight Grand Cross of the Order of St Michael and St George in 1899.

The Brisbane suburb of Chermside is named in Chermside's honour.

Government offices
Preceded by Lord Lamington	Governor of Queensland; 1902–1904	Succeeded by Lord Chelmsford
