= Electoral results for the district of Chermside =

Queensland, Australia, district election results

This is a list of electoral results for the electoral district of Chermside in Queensland state elections.

== Members for Chermside ==
First incarnation (1950–1960)
Member	Party	Term
Alex Dewar	Liberal	1950–1960
Second incarnation (1992–2001)
Member	Party	Term
Terry Sullivan	Labor	1992–2001

== Election results ==
=== Elections in the 1990s ===
The results for the 1998 election were:

1998 Queensland state election: Chermside
Party	Candidate	Votes	%	±%
Labor	Terry Sullivan	9,345	49.89	−1.97
Liberal	Zenia Belcher	5,623	30.02	−12.16
One Nation	Hazel Walsh	2,905	15.51	+15.51
Democrats	John Lambert	717	3.83	+3.83
Reform	Noel Otto	141	0.75	+0.75
Total formal votes		18,731	98.67	+0.19
Informal votes		253	1.33	−0.19
Turnout		18,984	93.13	−0.21
Two-party-preferred result
Labor	Terry Sullivan	10,456	59.02	+3.68
Liberal	Zenia Belcher	7,260	40.98	−3.68
Labor hold		Swing	+3.68	

1995 Queensland state election: Chermside
Party	Candidate	Votes	%	±%
Labor	Terry Sullivan	9,784	51.86	−7.87
Liberal	Zenia Belcher	7,958	42.18	+15.75
Independent	Matthew Low	1,124	5.96	+5.96
Total formal votes		18,866	98.48	+0.47
Informal votes		292	1.52	−0.47
Turnout		19,158	93.34	+0.10
Two-party-preferred result
Labor	Terry Sullivan	10,352	55.34	−6.36
Liberal	Zenia Belcher	8,353	44.66	+6.36
Labor hold		Swing	−6.36	

1992 Queensland state election: Chermside
Party	Candidate	Votes	%	±%
Labor	Terry Sullivan	11,799	59.7	+5.3
Liberal	Keith Schafferius	5,221	26.4	−5.0
National	Doug Foggo	2,734	13.8	+2.9
Total formal votes		19,754	98.0	
Informal votes		401	2.0	
Turnout		20,155	93.2	
Two-party-preferred result
Labor	Terry Sullivan	12,050	61.7	+5.0
Liberal	Keith Schafferius	7,479	38.3	−5.0
Labor hold		Swing	+5.0	

=== Elections in the 1950s ===
1957 Queensland state election: Chermside
Party	Candidate	Votes	%	±%
Liberal	Alex Dewar	9,476	54.1	−4.4
Labor	Leslie Sampson	4,487	25.6	−15.9
Queensland Labor	John Parry	3,546	20.3	+20.3
Total formal votes		17,509	98.9	+0.3
Informal votes		193	1.1	−0.3
Turnout		17,702	95.8	+1.6
Liberal hold		Swing	+9.4	

1956 Queensland state election: Chermside
Party	Candidate	Votes	%	±%
Liberal	Alex Dewar	9,617	58.5	+6.9
Labor	Dudley Ryder	6,831	41.5	−6.9
Total formal votes		16,448	98.6	−0.6
Informal votes		230	1.4	+0.6
Turnout		16,678	94.2	−0.8
Liberal hold		Swing	+6.9	

1953 Queensland state election: Chermside
Party	Candidate	Votes	%	±%
Liberal	Alex Dewar	7,306	51.6	−8.5
Labor	Kenneth McRae	6,844	48.4	+8.5
Total formal votes		14,150	99.2	+0.5
Informal votes		116	0.8	−0.5
Turnout		14,266	95.0	+0.6
Liberal hold		Swing	−8.5	

1950 Queensland state election: Chermside
Party	Candidate	Votes	%	±%
Liberal	Alex Dewar	6,910	60.1	
Labor	James Macarthur	4,585	39.9	
Total formal votes		11,495	98.7	
Informal votes		150	1.3	
Turnout		11,645	94.4	
Liberal hold		Swing		
