= South Brisbane Town Hall =

Heritage-listed town hall in Queensland, Australia

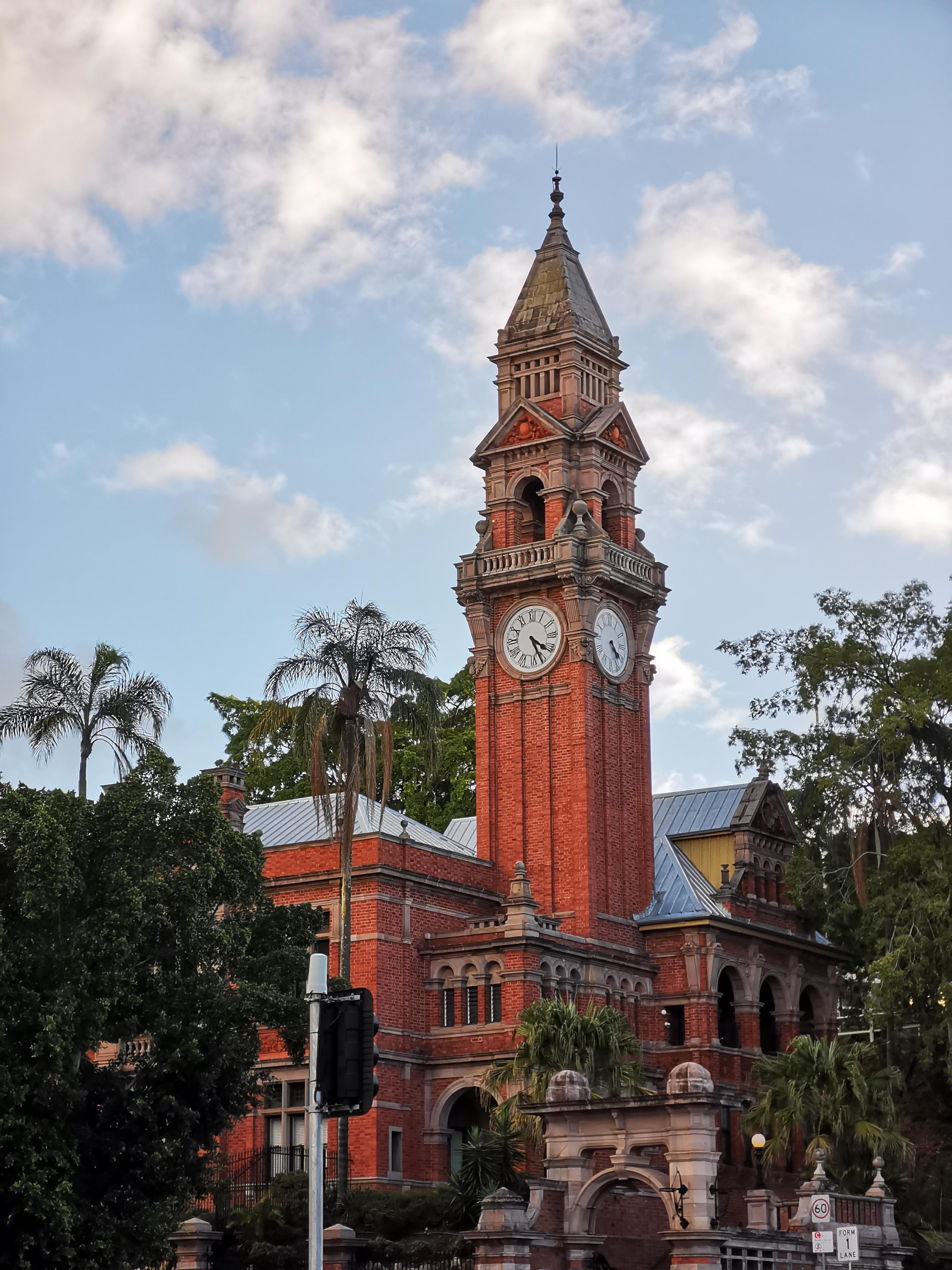
- Interactive map of the South Brisbane Town Hall area
- Alternative names: South Brisbane Municipal Chambers, Town Hall

General information
- Architectural style: Italianate Classic Revival
- Location: Vulture Street, South Brisbane, Queensland, Brisbane, Australia
- Coordinates: 27.4833°S 153.0254°E
- Construction started: January 1891
- Opened: 1 July 1892

Technical details
- Floor count: 4

Design and construction
- Architect: John Smith Murdoch
- Architecture firm: John Hall And Son
- Main contractor: Abraham James

The Old South Brisbane Town Hall is the heritage-listed town hall of the Borough of South Brisbane, later the City of South Brisbane, Queensland, Australia. It is located at 263 Vulture Street (on the south-west corner of the intersection of Graham Street), South Brisbane, adjacent to Cumbooquepa, the residence of William Stephens, the Member of the Legislative Assembly of Queensland and mayor of Borough of South Brisbane.

== History ==
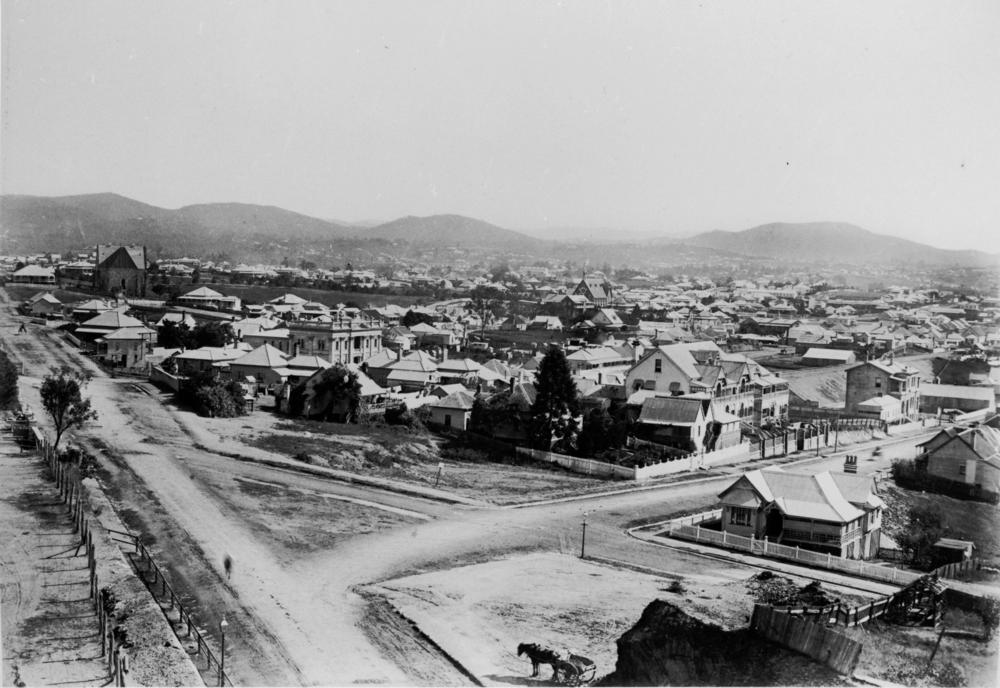
View of South Brisbane from the town hall c.1895

In 1888 the Borough of South Brisbane was established, independent of the Brisbane Municipal Council.

In 1891, work commenced on the construction of the town hall. The building was officially opened on 1 July 1892 Although it was widely known as the "Town Hall", it was officially the South Brisbane Municipal Chambers. On 6 June 1892 the Brisbane Courier reported that:

"It has been customary to refer to this building as town hall, but it is not a town hall, and was never meant to be such, but merely offices for the accommodation of the municipal officials and the alderman, the expense of providing a town hall being quite unnecessary, looking at the several large unoccupied public halls in the borough and profiting by the lesson afforded by some suburban cities in the Southern colonies. The building is planned in a very simple manner...."

Consistent with that claim, there is no public hall within the building. Against it, the building was described as "one of the most ornate and elegant buildings in the city" and was constructed at a final cost of £11,000 and in a prominent position with a tall clock tower, typical of a town hall. It was commonly known as the South Brisbane Town Hall.

The building was used for its original intended purposes from 1892 until 1925, when the City of South Brisbane was amalgamated into the City of Greater Brisbane. The building was then used by the amalgamated council as a Council Works Depot.

The clock tower was installed in 1904 and was reported to be the first electrically-driven clock system in Australia.

During World War II the old Town Hall and the neighbouring Cumbooquepa (now occupied and enlarged by Somerville House school) were occupied by the American Armed Services. As both sets of building were perched high above the street (particularly so for Somerville House), the Americans decided to create a ramp between them to avoid the need to walk up and down to the street. They removed a leadlight window from the upper storey (above the staircase) of the Town Hall to provide an access point for the ramp; the leadlight could not be found after the Americans departed.

After the war, the Town Hall was converted into residential flats, which were occupied by the families of council engineers recruited from England.

In 1957, the building was extensively refurbished to be used as the Queensland Conservatorium of Music.

Major restoration work was undertaken again in 1977 in preparation for the 1979 takeover of the building by the South Brisbane College of Technical and Further Education (now Southbank Institute of Technology) as the centre for its Extension Programs (e.g., evening classes in photography and belly-dancing).

In 1984 a replica leadlight window was created to replace the one lost in World War II.

In 1984 the heritage value of the building was acknowledged in 1984 when it was listed by the National Trust of Australia, followed by listing in 1989 by the Australian Heritage Commission.

On 15 June 1999, neighbouring Somerville House purchased the building. The Chamber Room (the former council chambers) is used for school functions and the office areas used for various administrative functions (enrolments, accounts, and development). In 2011, the school decided to call the building "The Chambers" to reflect its origins.

== Architecture ==
In early 1890, a competition for the design of the municipal chambers was announced, despite the site for the building not having been decided. The competition required that the cost of the building be less than £5,000. Twenty designers were submitted and the winner was from architects Messrs John Hall And Son of Queen Street, Brisbane. The design was attributed to John Smith Murdoch who was later to become Commonwealth Deputy-General of Works and Chief Architect of the Commonwealth.

By the end of 1890, the site had been purchased (£2600) on the south-west corner of Vulture Street and Graham Street at South Brisbane, the hilly land had been cut away to create a level building site, albeit 12 feet (3.7 m) above the surrounding street, and tenders had been called for the construction of the building. On the last day of 1890, the mayor Arthur Morry signed a contract with builder Abraham James of Coorparoo for the cost of £6,999. The increased cost was because of a decision to add a basement and use stonework rather than cheaper concrete plasterwork for the exterior.

Building commenced in January 1891. Work proceeded for six months, when the contractor developed financial difficulties. The council then took over the construction of the building for three months, hoping the contractor would be able to resume the work, but this did not occur and new tenders were called to complete the building. The tenders for the various trades were won by:

- Messrs John Stuart & Co won the tender for the stonework, brickwork, carpentry and joining work
- Mr John Campbell for the plasterwork
- Mr James Kay for the plumbing and gasfitting
- Messrs James Lang & Co for painting and glazing

while Messrs Exton and Gough continued as the providers of leadlights.

The building was predominantly constructed from red Coorparoo and Waterstown bricks (without any alteration of natural colour). The brown and white sandstone facings are used in the entrance and exterior walls were supplied from Pearson's Quarry at Helidon. The exterior decoration used terracotta panelling (also in its natural colour) supplied by James Campbell & Sons of Albion. Ribbed galvanised iron was used for the roof.

The basic architectural style of the building is Italianate Classic Revival. The building consists two main storeys together with an entranceway from the road, a basement, an attic and a clock tower.

Being 12 feet (3.7 m) above the main road Vulture Street, the entrance from the street is through a brick and stone arched entrance gate, followed by concrete steps up to the entrance to the building. The open portico at the entrance is decorated with a slate tablet with a frame of Oamaru stone which displays the opening date of the building and the names of the aldermen and other council officials.

The ground floor vestibule was entered from the portico via a set of wrought iron gates, supplied by Messrs Crase & Co of Fortitude Valley. The vestibule gave access to two areas of the ground floor via swing doors (featuring ornamental glazing). The first area comprised the public office connecting to the accountant's office (which included a strongroom fitted with a Milner's door). The public office featured cast iron columns and a series of high-mounted leadlight windows. The second ground floor area comprised a wide corridor giving access to three offices (the town clerk, the mayor, and the engineer) and the engineering drawing office. The corridor had an ornamental tiled floor while the walls were cream with the lower wall (the dado) being a terracotta colour, with white plaster ornamentation. The three offices had large windows (on the Graham Street side of the building) and stone mantelpieces over the corner fireplaces. Another strongroom was provided in the engineering drawing office for the storage of plans. There was also a handsomely-fitted lavatory.

The upper floor is dominated by the council chamber with two other areas to either side. The council chamber is 46 by 29 feet (14.0 by 8.8 m) and was decorated with ornate plasterwork and pilasters (half-columns); it was lit by transom windows and gas lighting. For its principal use (council meetings), the room was divided by a brass rail supported by wrought iron into the area for alderman and the area for the public, each served by its own entrance door. However, when the room was used for public meetings and functions, the dividing rail could be removed and a third large entrance was used to access the entire space. The area at the Vulture Street side of the upper floor comprised a committee room and a retiring room for the alderman, both of which had balconies. On the other side of the council chambers where other council offices.

Connecting the ground and upper floors is a staircase built with white marble for the steps and handrails with other elements made of cedar. The staircase had a large window, handpainted with a design that included the seal of the Corporation of South Brisbane, the work of Messrs Exton & Gough. The walls of the staircase were cream with white plaster decorations.

The roof contains an attic, used for the storage of paperwork .

There is a clock tower, which was very visible throughout the district and affords fine view of the district. The tower is accessed by a series of wooden ladders. The clock in the tower was the first electrically-driven clock in Australia and was installed in 1904 by Alfred George Jackson of the Synchronome Electrical Co. of Australasia Ltd.

The basement which had an entrance at street level from Graham Street was used by workmen for the storage of tools and some materials. The pay office for the workmen was also located in the basement, which had a small flight of stairs giving access to the ground floor.

== Heritage listing ==
The building was listed on the Queensland Heritage Register on 21 October 1992.

== See also ==
- History of Brisbane
