= Nassagaweya, West End =

Nassagaweya
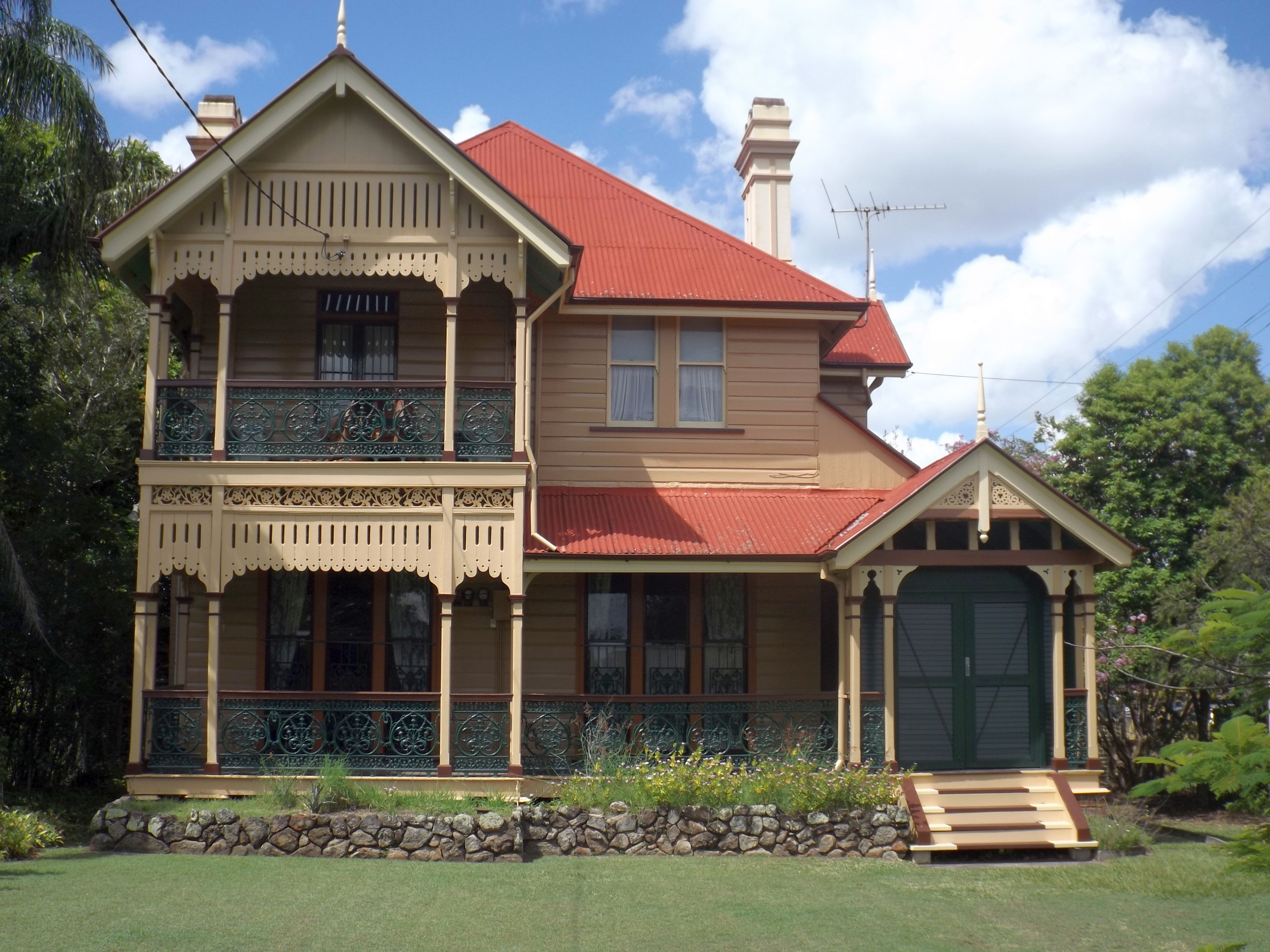
- Residence in 2015

- Location within Queensland Location within Australia
- 27.4881°S 153.0025°E
- Location: 37 Gray Road, West End, Queensland, Australia

History
- Design period: 1870s–1890s (late 19th century)
- Built: c. 1885

Site notes
- Architect: Arthur Morry

Queensland Heritage Register
- Official name: Nassagaweya
- Type: state heritage (built)
- Designated: 21 October 1992
- Reference no.: 600227
- Significant period: 1880s (fabric); 1880s–1890s (historical)
- Significant components: service wing, residential accommodation – main house

Nassagaweya is a heritage-listed detached house at 37 Gray Road, West End, Queensland, Australia. It was designed by Arthur Morry and built c. 1885. It was added to the Queensland Heritage Register on 21 October 1992.

== History ==
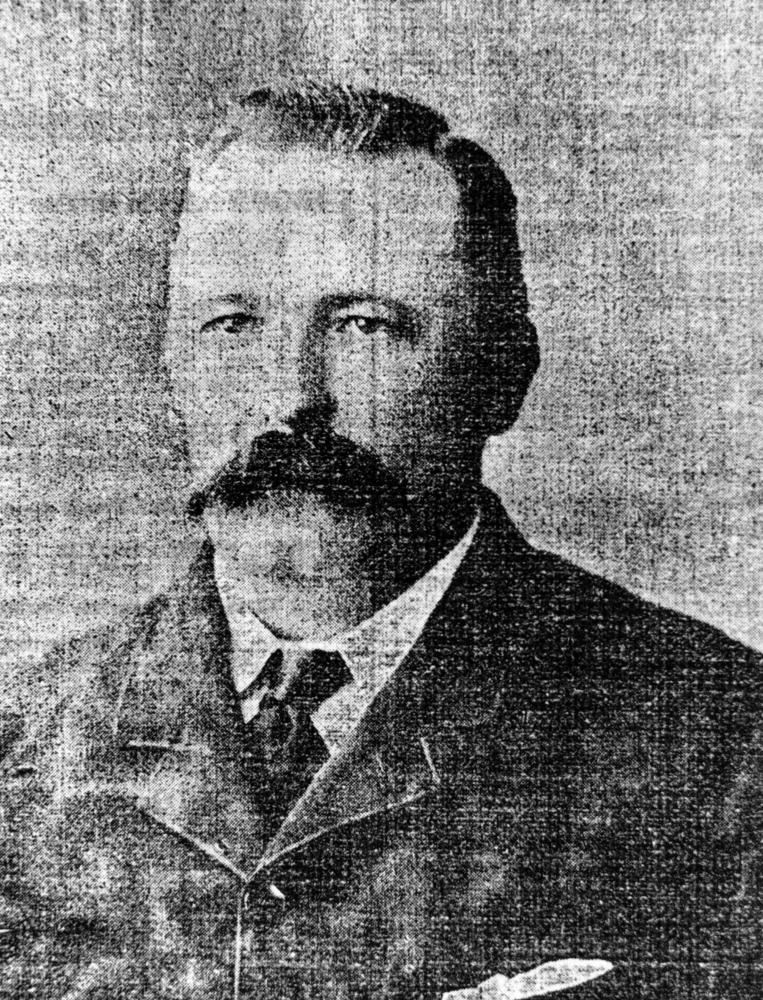
Arthur Morry, 1890

Nassagaweya was built in c.1885 by architect Arthur Morry as his own residence. He was later to become mayor of the City of South Brisbane and a Member of the Queensland Legislative Assembly for South Brisbane.

After Morry left the house in 1895, the property was probably rented until 1915 when it was purchased by a Scottish-Canadian, John Gillies. He named the house Nassagaweya after his birthplace of Nassagaweya Township in Ontario, a Delaware Indian word meaning "home by the maple forests". Gillies died in 1946 and the house remains in the family. Today it occupies a corner site, the adjoining streets of which are named after two previous owners of the property, Gray and Morry.

== Description ==
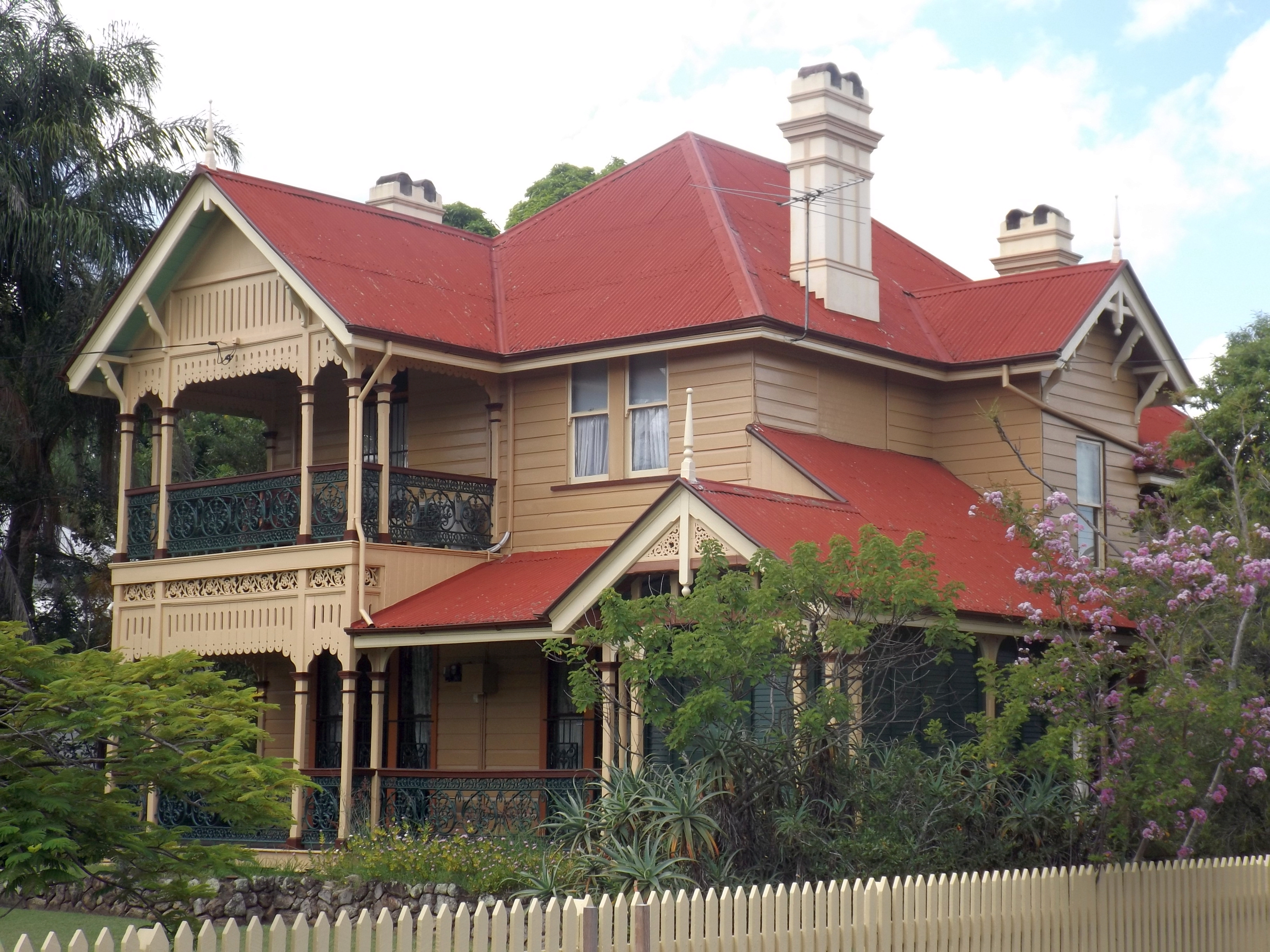
View from Morry Street, 2015

Nassagaweya is a two-storeyed timber house (c.1885) with a pyramid roof in corrugated iron, which was previously slate. Built on a corner block, the square-shaped core has a number of gabled projections on the street frontages.

The front elevation is dominated by a double-storeyed gabled verandah on the left which has cast-iron balusters and frieze and a pierced timber valance. On the right is a gabled portico. This leads onto a small verandah, enclosed by timber louvres, which projects to the side.

The side elevation is a complex arrangement of gabled insert verandahs, the louvred verandah and a projecting kitchen entry.

Internally, the room spaces and joinery reflect the innovative spirit of the exterior. The house remains unaltered except for a room apparently added at the rear. The overall effect is an unusual and whimsical composition.

Outbuildings, including stables, burnt down some time ago.

== Heritage listing ==
Nassagaweya was listed on the Queensland Heritage Register on 21 October 1992 having satisfied the following criteria.

The place is important in demonstrating the evolution or pattern of Queensland's history.

One of several, sizeable timber houses built at Hill End during the 1880s boom.

The place is important in demonstrating the principal characteristics of a particular class of cultural places.

Nassagaweya is significant as an individualistic and intact 1880s residence.

The place has a special association with the life or work of a particular person, group or organisation of importance in Queensland's history.

Nassagaweya is significant for its close association with architect and politician Arthur Morry, built as his own residence.
