= Charles Midson =

Australian politician

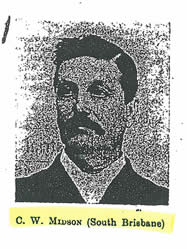

Member of the Queensland Legislative Assembly for Brisbane South
- In office 6 May 1893 – 21 April 1896
- Preceded by: Arthur Morry
- Succeeded by: William Stephens

Personal details
- Born: Charles William Midson; 30 August 1837 London, England
- Died: 8 April 1903 (aged 65) Brisbane, Queensland, Australia
- Resting place: South Brisbane Cemetery
- Party: Ministerialist
- Spouse: Mary Hurley Moran (m.1864 d.1910)
- Occupation: Builder

Charles William Midson (30 August 1837 – 8 April 1903) was a builder and a member of the Queensland Legislative Assembly.

== Early years ==
Midson was born in London, England, to parents James Midson and his wife Elizabeth Catherine (née Donnelly). After beginning his working career as an apprentice builder with his father in England he arrived in Victoria in 1853 where he worked the goldfields in Indigo, Ovens and Snowy River. He returned to England in 1855 but was back in Australia the following year working as a builder in New South Wales before travelling to Brisbane in 1860 where he won large government and commercial building contracts including the Port Office Hotel, Hunter's Boot Factory, White's Hotel, and the Courier Building. Midson later became a director of the Imperial Deposit Bank and Watertown Brick Company and at the time of his death owned the Woolloongabba Glassworks.

== Political career ==
Midson was a member of the Legislative Assembly of Queensland, holding the seat of South Brisbane from 1893 until his defeat at the 1896 election. He had also served as an alderman on the South Brisbane Municipal Council.

== Personal life ==
In 1864 Midson married Mary Hurley Moran (died 1910) and together had four sons and three daughters. Midson died of appendicitis in April 1903 and as per his request a private funeral was held, moving from his former residence in Grey Street, South Brisbane, to the South Brisbane Cemetery.

Parliament of Queensland
Preceded by Arthur Morry	Member for Brisbane South; 1893–1896	Succeeded by William Stephens
