= Abraham Luya =

Australian politician (1837–1899)

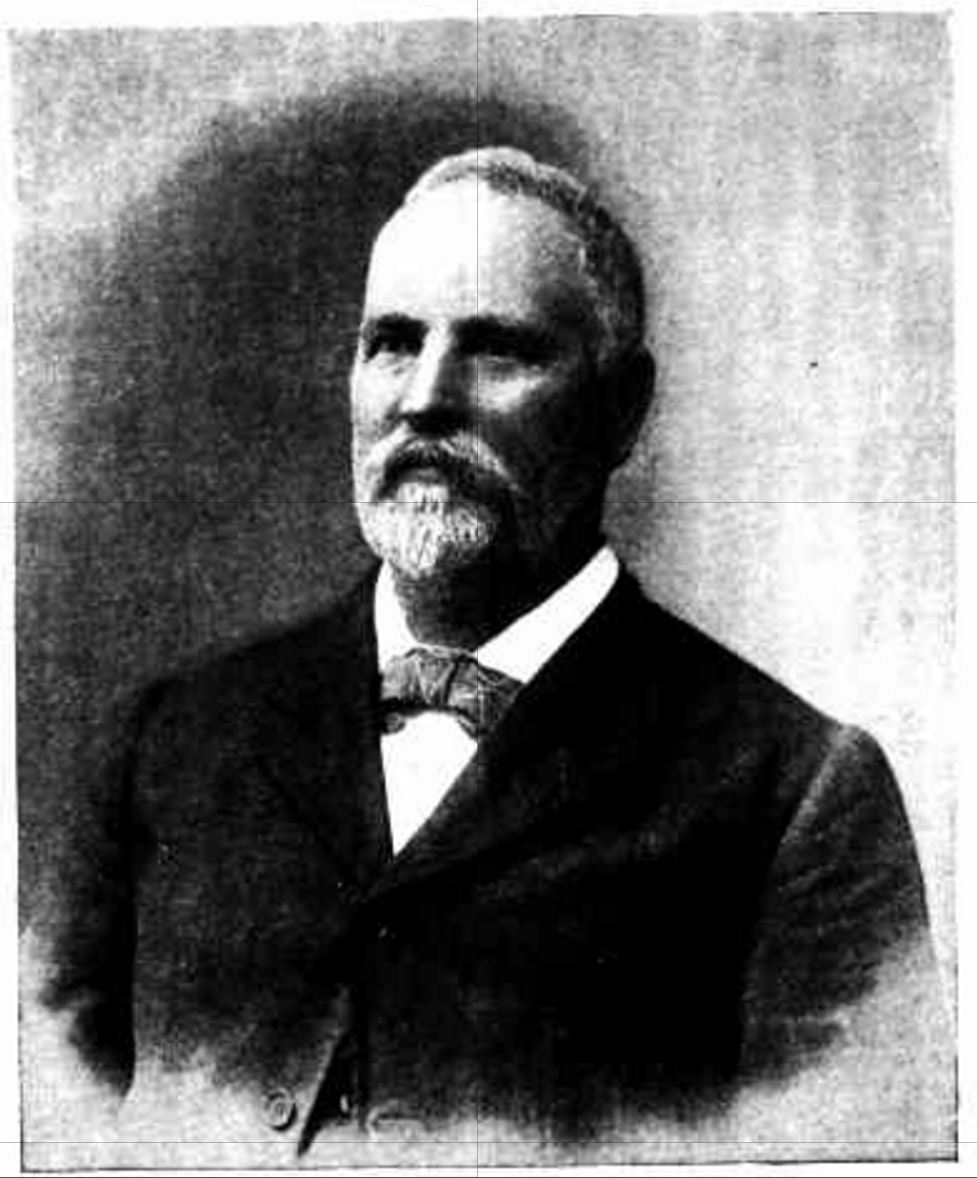
- Abraham Fleetwood Luya, 1898

Member of the Queensland Legislative Assembly for Brisbane South
- In office 12 May 1888 – 6 May 1893
- Preceded by: Henry Jordan
- Succeeded by: Arthur Morry
- In office 11 March 1899 – 6 July 1899
- Preceded by: William Stephens
- Succeeded by: Harry Turley

Personal details
- Born: Abraham Fleetwood Luya; 1837 Liverpool, England
- Died: 6 July 1899 (Aged 61 or 62) Brisbane, Queensland, Australia
- Resting place: South Brisbane Cemetery
- Spouse: Eliza Clare Petrie (m.1857 d.1923)
- Occupation: Sawmiller, Company director

Abraham Fleetwood Luya (1837 – 6 July 1899) was a businessman and politician in Brisbane, Queensland, Australia. He was a mayor of South Brisbane and a member of the Queensland Legislative Assembly.

== Early years ==
Luya was born in Liverpool, England, to parents Abraham Luya and his wife Maria (née Fleetwood). Educated at Liverpool, he worked as a shipping clerk in England before finding work as a midshipman on the Anglia eastern trade. He arrived in New South Wales in 1855 before moving to Queensland in 1864 and worked at several jobs before opening Cootharaba Sawmills in 1869 at Gympie. In 1871, Luya helped established McGhie, Luya & Company, a merchant and sawmilling business (now the heritage-listed Mill Point Settlement archeological site). From 1888 to 1899 he was managing director of the Queensland Milling Company.

== Political career ==
Luya was a member of the Legislative Assembly of Queensland, holding the seat of Brisbane South on two separate occasions, from 1888 until his defeat at the 1893 colonial election, and then from March 1899 until his death four months later.

During his career in parliament he formed an alliance with the Premier of Queensland, Thomas McIlwraith.

Luya was also an alderman in the South Brisbane Municipal Council, serving as its mayor from 1896 to 1898.

== Personal life ==
In 1857 Luya married Eliza Clare (died 1923) in New South Wales and together had 3 sons and six daughters. Luya died in July 1899 and his funeral proceeded from his late residence at Boggo Road Junction to the South Brisbane Cemetery.

Parliament of Queensland
Preceded by Henry Jordan	Member for Brisbane South; 1888–1893	Succeeded by Arthur Morry
Preceded by William Stephens	Member for Brisbane South; 1899	Succeeded by Harry Turley
