= Thomas Dibley =

Australian politician

Member of the Queensland Legislative Assembly for Woolloongabba
- In office 28 March 1896 – 18 May 1907
- Preceded by: William Stephens
- Succeeded by: George Blocksidge

Personal details
- Born: Thomas Dibley; 1829 Mudgee, New South Wales, Australia
- Died: 31 May 1912 (aged 82-83) Brisbane, Queensland, Australia
- Resting place: Balmoral Cemetery
- Party: Kidstonites
- Other political affiliations: Labour
- Spouse: Matilda Marie Gates (m.1867 d.1913)
- Occupation: Butcher

Thomas Dibley (1829 - 31 May 1912) was a member of the Queensland Legislative Assembly.

== Biography ==
Dibley was born at Mudgee, New South Wales, the son of the Ebenezer Dibley and his wife Mary (née Monckton). He was an apprentice in a Sydney tobacco factory and in 1865 moved to Queensland and leased J.M. Thompson's Cothill Estate in Ipswich. He then became a butcher and timber-getter in Noosa and the Wide-Bay regions and he then moved to Brisbane in 1893 where he worked as a butcher at Woolloongabba.

On 30 September 1867 Dibley married Matilda Marie Gates (died 1913) at Ipswich and together had four sons and four daughters. He died in May 1912 and was buried in the Balmoral Cemetery.

== Public life ==
Dibley was an alderman on the South Brisbane Municipal Council before winning the seat of Woolloongabba for Labour at the 1896 Queensland colonial election. He held the seat until 1907, when Dibley, by then a member of the Kidstonites, lost his seat to the Opposition Party's George Blocksidge.

Preceded by William Stephens	Member for Woolloongabba; 1896–1907	Succeeded by George Blocksidge
