= Junction Park State School =

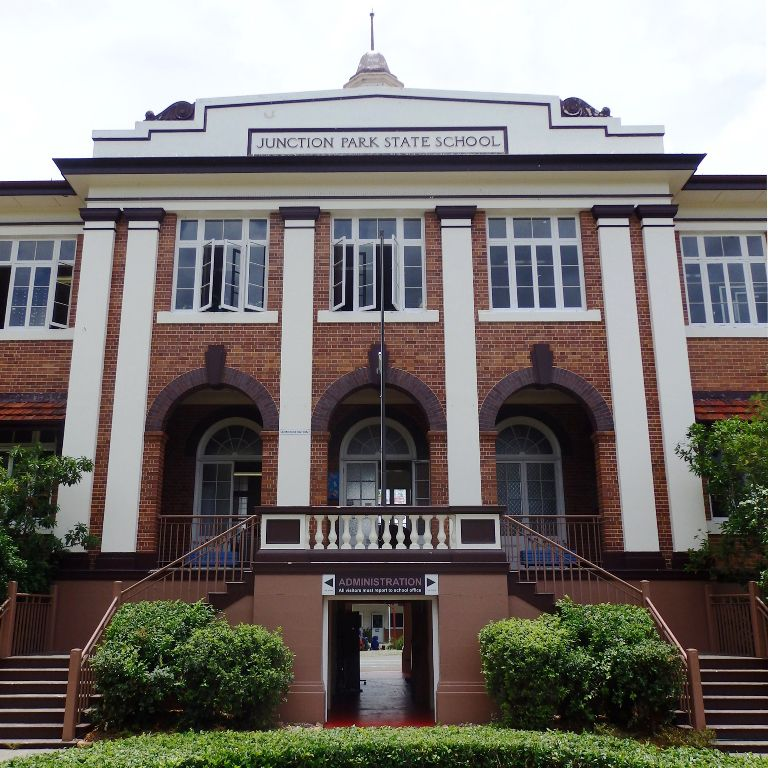
- Front entrance, Depression-era brick school building as seen from Waldheim Street, 2015

- Location within Queensland
- 27.5095°S 153.0352°E
- Location: 50 Waldheim Street, Annerley, City of Brisbane, Queensland, Australia

History
- Design period: 1919–1930s (Interwar period)
- Built: 1909–1910, 1928–1929, 1934, 1935–1936, 1935

Site notes
- Architectural style: Classicism

Queensland Heritage Register
- Official name: Junction Park State School; Thompson Estate State School (former)
- Type: state heritage
- Designated: 6 May 2016
- Reference no.: 650023
- Type: Education, Research, Scientific Facility: School – state (primary)
- Theme: Educating Queenslanders: Providing primary schooling
- Builders: Queensland Department of Public Works, MR Hornibrook

Junction Park State School is a heritage-listed state school at 50 Waldheim Street, Annerley, City of Brisbane, Queensland, Australia. It was built from 1909 to 1910 by the Queensland Department of Public Works and MR Hornibrook. It is also known as the former Thompson Estate State School. It was added to the Queensland Heritage Register on 6 May 2016.

== History ==
Junction Park State School opened on its present site in 1891 as the Thompson Estate State School, to accommodate the growing suburban population of a previously rural district on the southern outskirts of Brisbane. Junction Park State School retains two early swimming pools (1910, 1929) and a Depression-era brick school building (1936) with associated concrete retaining walls (c.1935) and brick toilet blocks (1934). Set in landscaped grounds with mature shade trees, the school has been in continuous operation since establishment and has been a focus for the local community as a place for important social and cultural activity.

The Junction Park State School is today located in the suburb of Annerley, part of the traditional lands of the Turrbal and Jagera people. Annerley was originally part of an area called "Boggo", which ran from Dutton Park to Rocky Water Holes (later Rocklea). The Junction Hotel, established at the junction of Boggo Road (now Annerley Road) and Ipswich Road in 1866, was the beginning of a township at that location, known as Boggo until being renamed Annerley in 1892. Local farms, surveyed in the late 1850s, were replaced by suburbs from the late-19th century, due to the area's proximity to South Brisbane. Development was facilitated by construction of the Corinda–Yeerongpilly railway line in 1884 and the extension of an electric tram service from Woolloongabba to Dudley Street (south of the Junction Hotel) in 1899. The tramline was later extended south to Cracknell Road (north of Yeronga Park) in 1914.

The sale of suburban allotments in the Thompson Estate, east of Ipswich Road and west of Norman Creek, between O'Keefe Street in the north and Victoria Terrace in the south, from 1881, led to calls for a local school. (In 1977 the Thompson Estate was bisected by the new South East Freeway.) By the mid-1880s the nearest schools were at Yeronga (opened as Boggo Primary School in 1871), Coorparoo (1876), and Dutton Park (1884).

The provision of state-administered education was important to the colonial governments of Australia. National schools, established in 1848 in New South Wales were continued in Queensland following the colony's creation in 1859. Following the introduction of the Education Act 1860, which established the Board of General Education and began standardising curriculum, training and facilities, Queensland's national and public schools grew from four in 1860 to 230 by 1875. The State Education Act 1875 provided for free, compulsory and secular primary education and established the Department of Public Instruction. This further standardised the provision of education, and despite difficulties, achieved the remarkable feat of bringing basic literacy to most Queensland children by 1900.

The establishment of schools was considered an essential step in the development of early communities and integral to their success. Locals often donated land and labour for a school's construction and the school community contributed to maintenance and development. Schools became a community focus, a symbol of progress, and a source of pride, with enduring connections formed with past pupils, parents, and teachers. The inclusion of war memorials and community halls reinforced these connections and provided a venue for a wide range of community events in schools across Queensland.

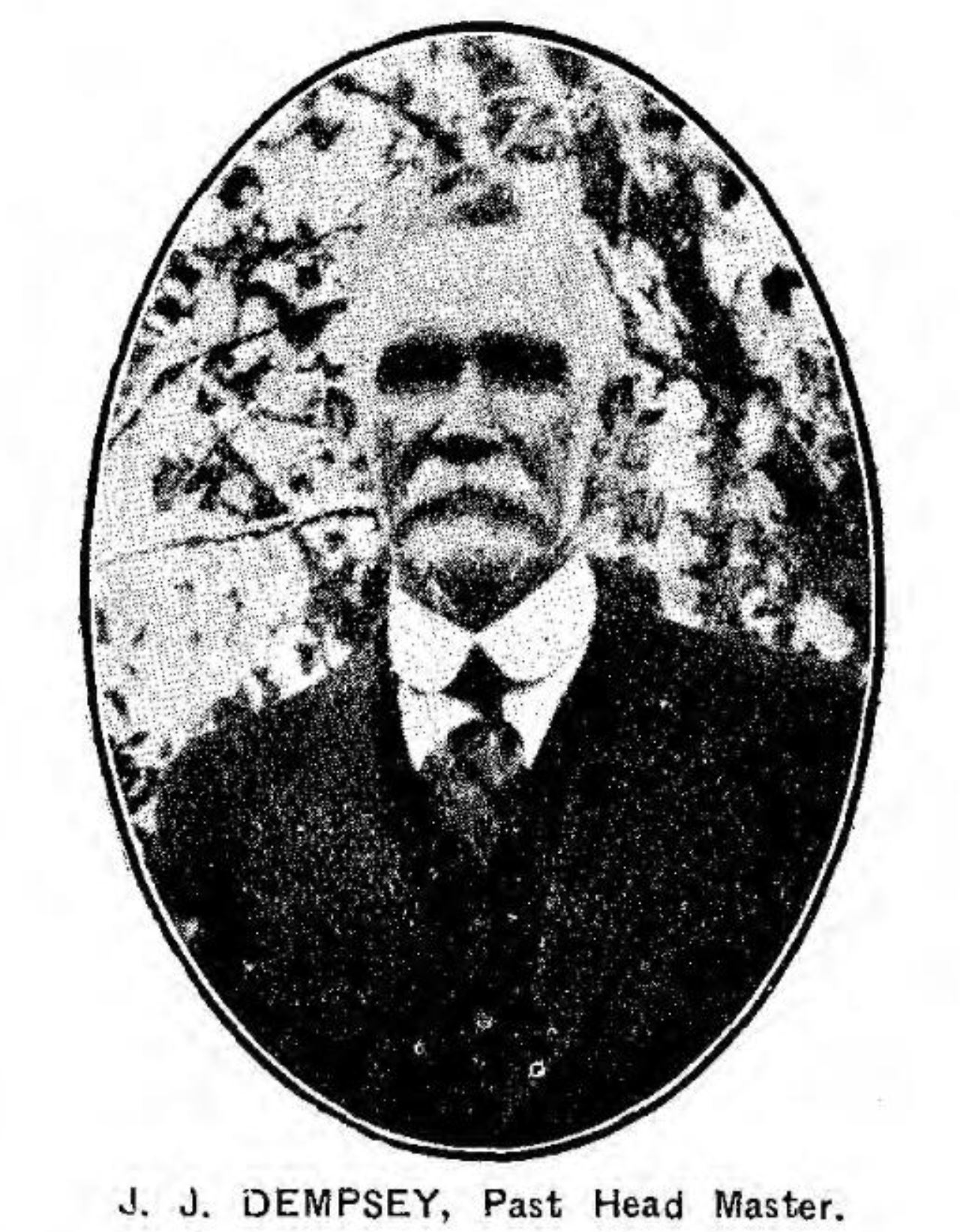
James Joseph Dempsey, headmaster 1889 to 1923

From 30 April 1888 the Thompson Estate Provisional School No. 514 was conducted in a rented four-room cottage in Oxford Street (now between the Pacific Motorway and Norman Creek). A provisional school could be opened with as few as 15 (later 12) pupils. The Board of General Education gave financial assistance to local committees to set up and maintain these schools. The local committee provided a building and found a teacher, and the Board paid the teacher's salary relative to the number of pupils. If the district or town developed, provisional schools were raised to state school status, with purpose-designed school buildings and teacher residences attracting better qualified and more experienced teachers. The school, under Kathleen Barry, initially had 52 pupils, rising to 173 by December 1888. In January 1889 James Joseph Dempsey (head teacher of the school until 1923) replaced Barry, and upon reaching 200 pupils the school was moved to a hall in Regent Street (west of Oxford Street) in August 1889. The school became Thompson Estate State School in January 1891. The delay in the school being upgraded from provisional to state school, despite its rapidly increasing enrolment, was due to the school committee initially being unable to raise the required financial contribution.

While pupil attendance was rising, a permanent site for the school was being sought, alongside community fundraising to obtain one-fifth of the cost of a school as required by the government. In mid-1888, William Stephens, Member of the Queensland Legislative Assembly, and chairman of the Thompson Estate school committee, asked the Stephens Divisional Board if it would object to the Queensland Government resuming some land for a school. As a result, 5 acres (2.0 ha) of land east of Ipswich Road (not including land adjacent to Ipswich Road, which remained a recreation reserve) was donated by the Stephens Divisional Board, although there was some disagreement from a rival school committee over the location. William Stephens was also the Mayor of South Brisbane in 1888, 1899, and 1901 The land was reserved for state school purposes on 19 July 1890. The land was previously part of Portion 105, purchased in 1859 by Stephen's father Thomas Blacket Stephens, Brisbane's second mayor (1862) and a newspaper proprietor. The northern part of Portion 105, plus part of Portion 103 to the east (also previously owned by Thomas Stephens) had been gazetted as a 12.5-acre (5.1 ha) reserve for a manure depot in 1881. This was transferred to the Woolloongabba Divisional Board in 1883, and then to the Stephens Divisional Board (formed in 1886, and named after Thomas Stephens) in 1888

Between October 1890 and March 1891 a teacher's residence was built at the west end of the school reserve, and a timber school building was constructed further east, on the site of the current brick school building. Between the residence and the school were two small lagoons, on the site of today's oval. At this point Waldheim Street was only a track, which was included in the school grounds until the grounds were properly fenced in 1923. Waldheim Street also acted as the entrance to Waldheim (built c.1901, still extant), the family home of William Stephens, opposite the school

The new school and residence cost £1818. The high-set timber school building was occupied on 31 March 1891. The school had been designed to accommodate 280 pupils, but 425 turned up on the first day. Several extensions to the building followed between 1893 and 1900. The name of the school also changed to Junction Park State School in 1892.

The grounds at Junction Park State School were initially rough and unfenced. The first Arbor Day was celebrated at the school in May 1891, and 12 of the trees planted were supplied by the Brisbane Botanic Gardens. Arbor Day celebrations began in Queensland in 1890. Aesthetically designed gardens were encouraged by regional inspectors, and educators believed gardening and Arbor Days instilled in young minds the value of hard work and activity, improved classroom discipline, developed aesthetic tastes, and inspired people to stay on the land.

Along with built additions and tree planting, the area of the school also increased. The school grounds were expanded northwards from the 1890 school reserve, largely thanks to the efforts of Dempsey. Residential allotments along Gowrie Street (formerly Ferndale Street), between Harewood Street (formerly Alfred Street) and the eastern end of the school reserve, were gradually acquired. A residence on Lot 117 became the school caretaker's residence (removed by 1941). A tennis court was opened in 1908 near Gowrie Street, on some of the recently acquired land, and a second court was added in 1913. By 1934 all but three residential allotments - the two closest to Harewood Street (lots 106, 107) and one between B Block and the 1910 pool (lot 115), had been purchased. Lots 107 and 115 were later incorporated into the school grounds, which reached its maximum size of 7.2 acres (2.9 ha) by 1982. This included the addition of 23.3 perches (590 m^{2}) of land to the east end of the original reserve in 1958. By 1982 the school owned lots 107 to 126, along the south side of Gowrie Road.

As well as tennis courts, other sports facilities were constructed at the school. The early and continuing commitment to play-based education, particularly in primary school, resulted in the provision of outdoor play space and sporting facilities, such as ovals and tennis courts. A cricket pitch was created on the school grounds by 1894, after previously being played on a paddock south of the school reserve. In 1908, the school's military cadets benefited from the establishment of a miniature rifle range at the east end of school grounds. The targets were on the other side of the creek, with the shots passing over the heads of Chinese market gardeners on the creek flats. The Australian Government's Ekibin Rifle Range, associated with the nearby Annerley drill hall was also located south of the school.

Another sports facility constructed was a swimming pool, the first of its kind in a Queensland state school. Junction Park State School was already involved in swimming as a sport, using a local waterhole and a dammed section of Ekibin Creek, until a case of typhoid led to a change of venue from the creek to the Peel Street Baths in South Brisbane. Once a water main was extended to Gowrie Street, it was possible to have a swimming pool in the school grounds. Work commenced on a concrete pool in October 1909. By this time the school had an average attendance of 615, out of an enrolment of 700 pupils.

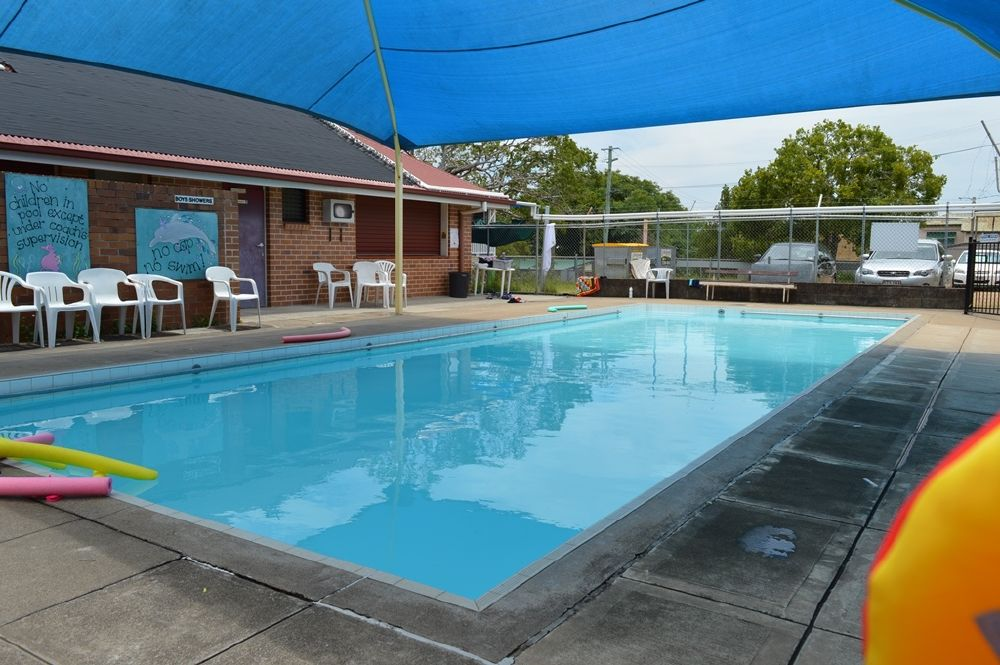
Smaller 1910 swimming pool, 2015

Measuring 43 by 16 feet (13.1 by 4.9 m), and 3 feet 6 inches (1.07 m) to 4 feet 3 inches (1.30 m) deep, the pool was built by Messrs Wells and Bennett of Woolloongabba, and was opened by Walter Barnes, the Minister for Public Instruction, on 5 February 1910. One end of the galvanised iron enclosure around the pool was roofed and partly enclosed as dressing rooms. Most of the £175 cost was raised by the school committee, with £80 provided by the government for a "recreation shed" (since it was not policy to fund swimming pools). JJ Dempsey, writing 10 years after he had finished as head teacher at the school, considered the pool to be a memorial to four young students of the school (boys aged 6 and 7) who had drowned at Baynes' Paddock (Stones Corner) in a flooded waterhole in February 1890. At the opening, John Douglas Story, the Under Secretary for Public Instruction, noted that baths at state schools would play an important part of training boys for the Australian navy.

As enrolments continued to climb, a new building for infants was opened on 22 June 1911, northeast of the main school building. A King Poinciana was planted as a "coronation tree" the same day, to commemorate the coronation of King George V. In October 1913, when the school had an average daily attendance of 800, a two-storey infants school building was added to the southeast of the 1911 building. This was named the "Denham Infant School", after the Premier, Digby Denham (who was also chairman of the school committee). That year the school was also connected to the main sewerage system, with toilets to the north of the main school building.

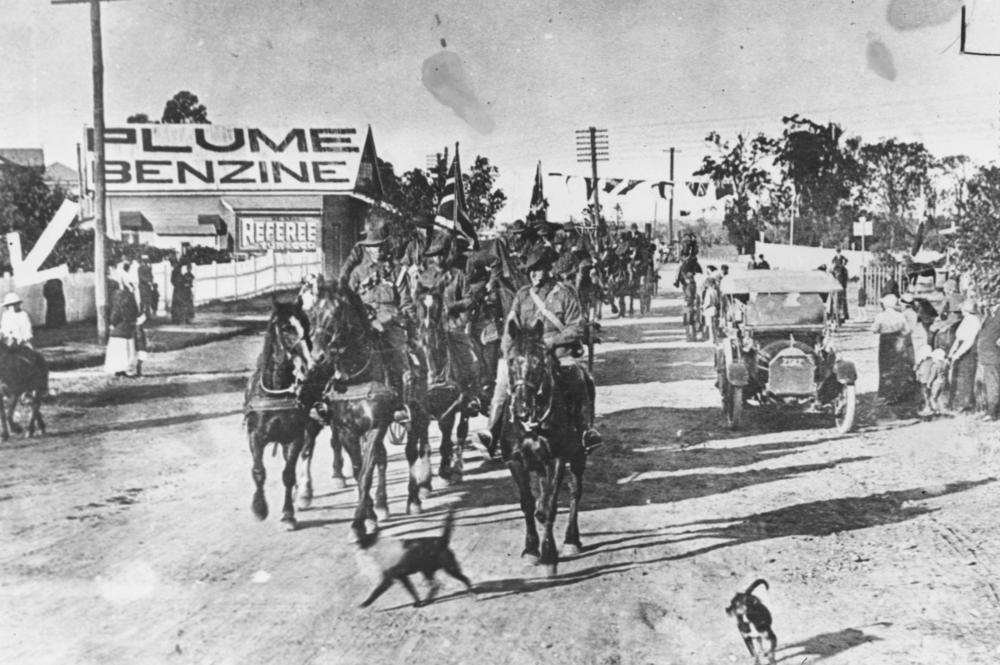
The March of the Dunagrees passing along Ipswich Road, Moorooka, before arriving at Junction Park State School, 30 November 1915

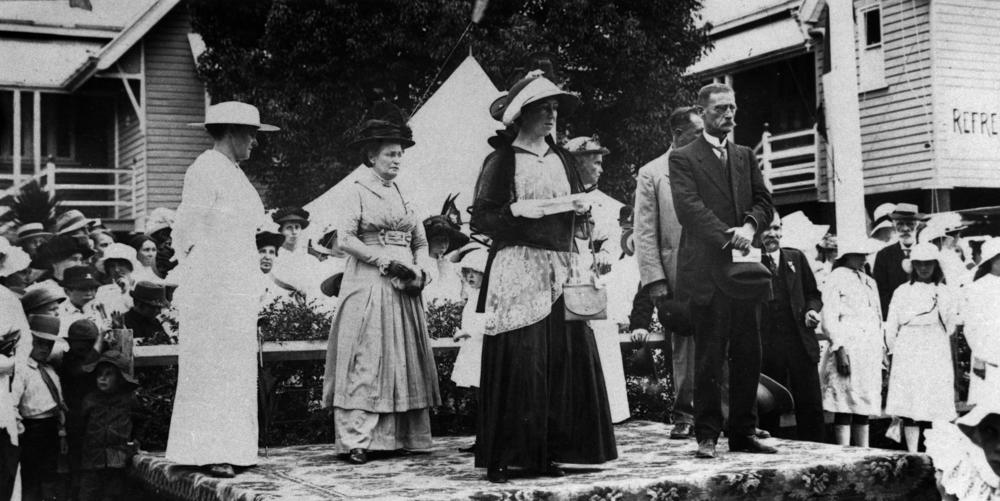
Lady Elsie Goold-Adams, wife of the Queensland Governor Hamilton Goold-Adams, at the opening of the Red Cross Fete at Junction Park State School, 1916

During World War I, the school contributed in many patriotic activities to support the war effort. Many former student enlisted in the armed forces. An honour board, dated 1915 (located in the former assembly room on the first floor of the Depression-era brick school building in 2016), has 86 names of former pupils who were "serving at the front". By December 1917 the school's honour board (possibly multiple boards) listed 300 former pupils who had enlisted, with 30 having died. The teachers, current pupils and their families also rallied behind the war effort. There were fundraising events to provide comforts for the troops as well as enthusiastic support for recruiting initiatives. In November 1915, the March of the Dungarees (a snowball march to attract army recruits) which started in Stanthorpe on 6 November. Along the route, local communities supported them with meals and accommodation. On 30 November, as the recruits marched along Ipswich Road on their final day, they stopped for breakfast provided by the families of Junction Park State School. On Saturday 30 September 1916 Junction Park State School held a fete and concert to raise funds for the Australian Red Cross.

Changes continued at the school, to accommodate the educational needs of the growing suburb. Annerley became a thriving business precinct in the early 20th century, and between 1911 and 1921 its population grew from 1203 to 2642. By 1923 a housing estate stood immediately to the south of the school. A new timber block of three classrooms (Block B) was built north of the main school building, near Gowrie Street, c. 1924. There are references to a "new wing" being opened at the school in 1925 (when there were nearly 1000 pupils in daily attendance), and this may refer to Block B. In 1925 Dempsey noted that the new addition had been built on land he had obtained. Block B was later reconfigured as two classrooms in 1937.

Other changes in the 1920s included a new, larger swimming pool. The school committee raised funds from c. 1926, and the new pool, located just east of the 1910 pool, was built by Hornibrook and Co, who had tendered for £690, from December 1928. Completed in early February 1929, the concrete 75 by 25 feet (22.9 by 7.6 m) pool, with 7-inch (180 mm) thick reinforced walls, ranged in depth from 3 to 7 feet (0.91 to 2.13 m). A fete was held at the school grounds in September 1929, to liquidate the remaining debt on the pool. The old pool was retained for infants and non-swimmers. By 1934 there was a brick wall around the pool and by 1944 tiered seating had been constructed. The concrete blocks on top of the brick wall post-date 1944. The wall and the tiered seating are present 1944 plans. The seating also appears to be present on a 1936 aerial photograph. A small concrete plinth south of the 1929 pool is of unknown date and purpose, but may be a flagpole base. The school had received a new flagpole in 1912, related to the coronation of King George V the previous year.

The 1930s brought major changes to the built fabric of the school. The Great Depression, commencing in 1929 and extending well into the 1930s, caused a dramatic reduction of building work in Queensland and brought private building work to a standstill. In response, the Queensland Government provided relief work for unemployed Queenslanders, and also embarked on an ambitious and important building program to provide impetus to the economy.

Even before the October 1929 stock market crash, the Queensland Government initiated an Unemployment Relief Scheme, through a work program by the Department of Public Works. This included painting and repairs to school buildings. By mid-1930 men were undertaking grounds improvement works to schools under the scheme. Extensive funding was given for improvements to school grounds, including fencing and levelling ground for play areas, involving terracing and retaining walls. This work created many large school ovals, which prior to this period were mostly cleared of trees but not landscaped. These play areas became a standard inclusion within Queensland state schools and a characteristic element.

In June 1932 the Forgan Smith Labor Government came to power from a campaign that advocated increased government spending to counter the effects of the Depression. The government embarked on a large public works building program designed to promote the employment of local skilled workers, the purchase of local building materials and the production of commodious, low maintenance buildings which would be a long-term asset to the state. This building program included: government offices, schools and colleges; university buildings; court houses and police stations; hospitals and asylums; and gaols.

Many of the programs have had lasting beneficial effects for the citizens of Queensland, including the construction of masonry brick school buildings across the state. Most were designed in a Classical idiom to project the sense of stability and optimism which the government sought to convey through the architecture of its public buildings.

The construction of substantial brick school buildings in prosperous or growing suburban areas and regional centres during the 1930s provided tangible proof of the government's commitment to remedy the unemployment situation. The Queensland Public Works Department and Department of Public Instruction were extremely enthusiastic about the brick school buildings designed in the 1930s. They were considered monuments to progress embodying the most modern principles of the ideal education environment.

Depression-era brick school buildings form a recognisable and important type, exhibiting many common characteristics. Frequently, they were two storeys above an open undercroft and built to accommodate up to 1000 students. They adopted a symmetrical plan form and often exhibited a prominent central entry. The plan arrangement was similar to that of timber buildings, being only one classroom deep, accessed by a long straight verandah or corridor. Due to their long plan forms of multiple wings, they could be built in stages if necessary; resulting in some complete designs never being realised. Ideally, the classrooms would face south with the verandah on the north but little concession was made for this and almost all Depression-era brick school buildings faced the primary boundary road, regardless of orientation (however, Junction Park State School's brick school building did have the classrooms facing south but this may be because it was simply facing the primary boundary road). Classrooms were commonly divided by folding timber partitions and the undercroft was used as covered play space, storage, ablutions and other functions.

Despite their similarities, each Depression-era Brick School building was individually designed by a DPW architect, which resulted in a wide range of styles and ornamental features being utilised within the overall set. These styles, which were derived from contemporary tastes and fashions, included: Arts and Crafts, typified by half-timbered gable-ends; Spanish Mission, with round-arched openings and decorative parapets; and Neo-classical, with pilasters, columns and large triangular pediments. Over time, variations occurred in building size, decorative treatment, and climatic-responsive features. The Chief Architect during this period was Andrew Baxter Leven (1885–1966), who was employed by the Queensland Government Works Department from 1910 to 1951, and was Chief Architect and Quantity Surveyor from 1933 to 1951.

A brick school building (Block A in 2016) for Junction Park State School was requested by the school committee in June 1934, approved in December 1934, and completed by June 1936. The central wing of the old timber school building was removed, while two other wings remained in place to the north and south of the new building, to allow teaching to continue during construction. Three new brick toilet blocks - one for boys, one for girls, and one for infants - plus a septic system, were constructed in 1934, for £3400, to complement the new brick school building.

In June 1935 the building "in progress" had an estimated cost of £20,560. It would contain twenty-one classrooms to accommodate 860 pupils, with the possibility for future extensions to provide for 1,020 pupils. The building was to be constructed of brick with an asbestos cement slate roof. The basement comprised a concreted play area and secondary entrances. The ground floor contained a main entrance portico to the south, entrance porches to the northern façade, ten classrooms, cloakrooms, a head teacher's office and a male teachers' room; and the first floor contained eleven classrooms, cloakrooms and a female teachers' room. Three classrooms on each floor were provided with folding partitions, to enable them to be converted to large assembly rooms. The building was reported as being "in progress" in the 1935 annual report of the Department of Public Works, although local media reported it as "completed". It was again mentioned, with a photograph of the building and the retaining wall to the west, in the 1936 DPW annual report. The building plans were drawn by Frederick Thomas Jellett, who had been articled with the Victorian Public Works Department and engaged by Queensland Public Works as a draftsman in 1920. Jellett's name also appears on drawings in the 1930s for extensions at New Farm State School and Ascot State School, and for Ayr and Ipswich North State Schools.

The symmetrical building, with classical detailing, addressed Waldheim Street, with a range running east–west, terminated by stairwells (and cloak rooms on the first and second floors), with more classrooms in the lateral wings at either end of the building. The classrooms were accessed by a rear (northern) verandah and all but four had windows to the south. The remaining four classrooms projected to the rear in the lateral wings, and had north windows. Classroom ceilings were battened with lattice vents on the second floor. Three classrooms to the east of the entrance bay on both the first and second floor were divided by folding doors. The remainder were divided by solid masonry walls with connecting double doors. Verandah floors were concrete. Entry was via a two-storey bay (with undercroft) that projected south from the centre of the range and framed the main entrance to the building. The bay was accessed by two sets of L-shaped stairs leading from Waldheim Street to an entrance loggia, which had three brick archways and a concrete balustrade of large square piers and decorative balusters. To the rear, two stairs with porch landings projected diagonally from the junction of the range and lateral wing on the first floor. The roof was tiled and was provided with a fleche. It appears that terracotta tiles rather than asbestos cement tiles were used.

A low concrete retaining wall with two sets of steps was built as part of the levelling of the grounds, to the west of the brick school building, and was constructed by 1935. The school residence had also been removed by 1935, and the land at the west end of the school was terraced by this time, as was the east end of the school. The concrete block retaining walls at the west end of the school may have been built between 1935 and World War II. Earth terraces are shown at the west end of the grounds, rather than a wall, in the BCC 1935 sewerage plan. The terracing appears to be more linear/regular by 1946, compared to a 1936 aerial, suggesting that the walls could have been added in the late 1930s. However, further research is required.

Block A was opened by the Minister for Public Instruction, Frank Cooper, on 17 October 1936, with the cost reported as £28,000, and the remaining wings of the old school were sold for removal around this time. The old timber wings are still present on an aerial photograph taken 20 April 1936. Some of the timber from the demolished wing was used to build dressing sheds and showers over the 1910 swimming pool, which remained covered until the sheds were demolished in 1955.

Like World War I, World War II also affected life at the school. Due to fear of Japanese invasion, the Queensland Government closed all coastal state schools in January 1942, and although most schools reopened on 2 March 1942, student attendance was optional until the war ended. The closed schools were sometimes occupied for defence purposes, and some schools remained closed "for special reasons" after the rest had reopened. Slit trenches, for protecting the students in the event of Japanese air raids, were also dug at Queensland state schools, often by parents and staff. Zig-zag trenches were dug at Junction Park State School, skirting the oval. A call went out for volunteer helpers to dig the trenches at the school. Traces of some of these trenches are visible in a 1946 aerial photograph of the school, along the south side of the oval. Junction Park also hosted students from Moorooka State School, which was occupied by the United States Army between February and July 1942.

After World War II, enrolments at the school continued to climb. The Department of Public Instruction was largely unprepared for the enormous demand for state education that began in the late 1940s and continued well into the 1960s. This was a nationwide occurrence resulting from the unprecedented population growth now termed the "baby boom". Queensland schools were overcrowded and, to cope, many new buildings were constructed and existing buildings were extended.

In 1947 enrolments at Junction Park State School reached 1477, and for a few years Junction Park State School was Brisbane's largest attended state school. In May 1948, the administration of the infants school separated from that of the primary school. In order to accommodate increasing student numbers at the primary school, Block B was extended at either end in 1953, and in 1955 Block C was added just west of Block B, on the site of the 1908–1913 tennis courts. Two new tennis courts had been formed at the west end of the school by 1951, on the terrace that was previously the site of the school residence.

A new infants school complex opened at the east end of the school reserve in April 1958. Concrete retaining walls were added between the 1930s brick school building and the infants school at this time (prior to the 1950s, plans and aerial photographs only show several earth banks at the east end of the school). The 1913 infants building was also removed, and the 1911 infants building was extended and remodelled as a domestic science and manual training block, and was shifted slightly northwest, to its current site near the northeast corner of the 1929 pool. Later, as infant enrolments fell (from 774 in 1952 to 320 in 1966) it was decided in 1974 to re-amalgamate the primary and infants schools. Meanwhile, the primary school had 1523 enrolled in 1958, dropping to 785 by 1965, as the baby boom ended and Grade 8 was transferred to secondary school in 1964.

Other changes have been made to the school over time, including partition and entrance alterations to the brick toilet blocks. The brick school building has had some internal changes, with some new partitions added to the first and second floors, and some classroom walls removed. In the summer of 2015–2016 the ceilings on the second floor were replaced. The southern side of the undercroft was enclosed between the piers with doors, fixed glass panels and louvres c. 1953; a tuck shop was added c. 1978 as an enclosure in the east side; and the lateral wings of the undercroft have been enclosed for classrooms and store rooms.

In 1964 a new entrance from Waldheim Street was created east of the brick school building, leading to a paved area. Some bitumen was removed from the playground behind the brick school building in 1995, to create a grassed area, and a forest of native trees (sclerophyll forest) was opened in the southeast corner of the grounds in 1997. Historic aerial photographs show that there has been a clump of trees in this corner of the school since at least 1936. An early tree appears to survive between the sclerophyll forest and the 1929 pool.

The site of the 1950s infants school complex was excised from the east end of the school grounds in 1998, leaving the school grounds at their current size of 5.4 acres (2.2 ha), and the infants school buildings were demolished between 1997 and 2000 (the land being later used for residential apartments). The infants school buildings were still present on a 1997 aerial photograph, but were demolished by 2000 and were later replaced by housing. Some new buildings were added to the school in 2003 and 2009.

The school celebrated the centenary of the opening of the Thomas Estate Provisional School in April 1988, with a banquet for 600 people at the Hilton International Ballroom, and a history of the school was also published that year. Another history was published in 2015.

In 2016 the school continues to operate from its original site, and retains its early swimming pools, Depression-era brick school building, toilet blocks, and retaining walls, set in landscaped grounds with mature shade trees. The school remains important to the Annerley community. Since establishment, generations of students have been taught at Junction Park State School and it has been a key social focus for its community with the grounds and buildings having been the location of many social events.

== Description ==
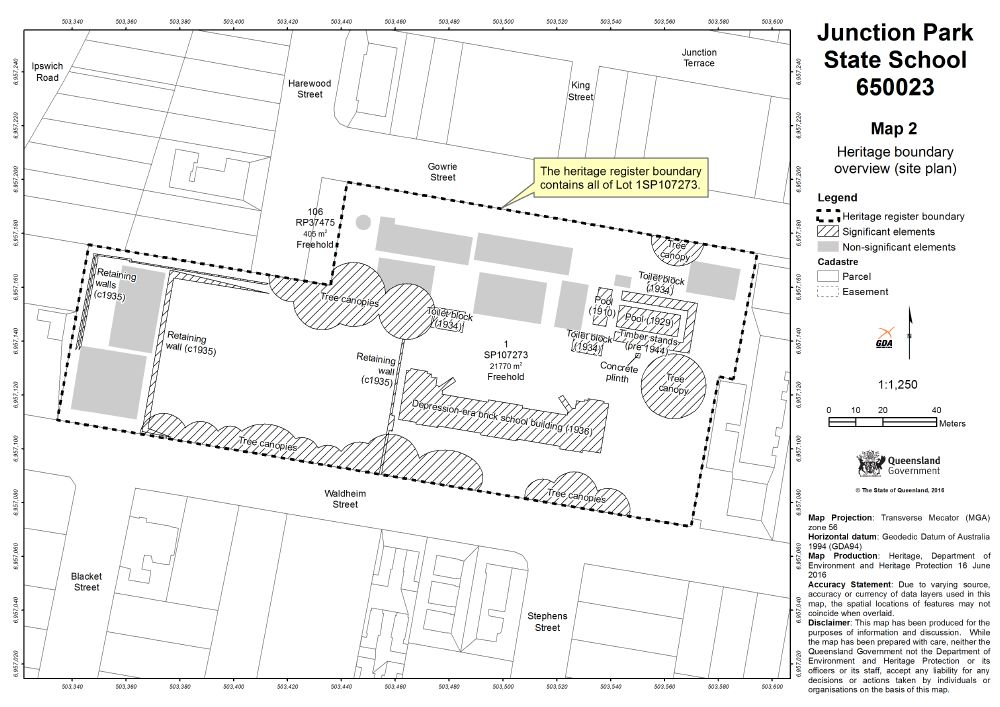
Site plan, 2016

Junction Park State School occupies a 2.2-hectare (5.4-acre) levelled site within the residential suburb of Annerley, approximately 4 kilometres (2.5 mi) south of the Brisbane CBD. The site faces, and is primarily accessed from, Waldheim Street to the south; and is bounded by Gowrie and Harewood streets (north), residential properties (north, east and west) and the Annerley Library (fronting Ipswich Road, west). The school comprises a range of buildings and structures; with the most prominent being a Depression-era brick school building (Block A; 1936), located at the southeast end of the site. A complex containing two early swimming pools (1910 and 1929) and timber stands (pre-1944) is located to the northeast of Block A, as are three brick toilet blocks (1934). Other important elements of the school include various Depression-era retaining walls at the west end of the grounds (c. 1935), an oval west of Block A, and mature trees.

=== Depression-era brick school building (Block A; 1936) ===
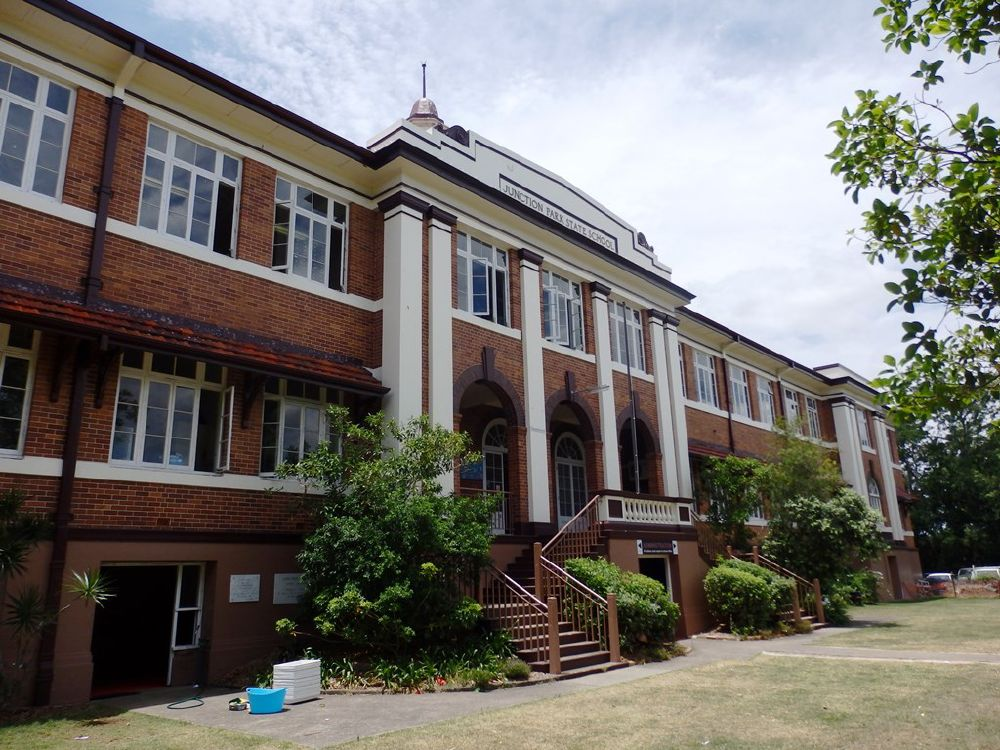
Brick school building from Waldheim Street, 2015

Block A is a symmetrical, masonry structure of two storeys, with an undercroft. A tall fleche projects above the tiled, hipped roof. The building comprises a range, running west–east, with two short lateral wings at the eastern and western ends, running south–north. A two-storey bay (with undercroft) projects south from the centre of the range and frames the main entrance to the building. It is accessed by two sets of L-shaped stairs leading from the Waldheim Street to an entrance loggia, which has three brick archways and a concrete balustrade of large square piers and decorative balusters. Additional entrances of concrete stairs diagonally project from the northern elevation at the junction of the range and lateral wings. These stairs have metal balustrades and enclosed, one-storey, face brick landings.

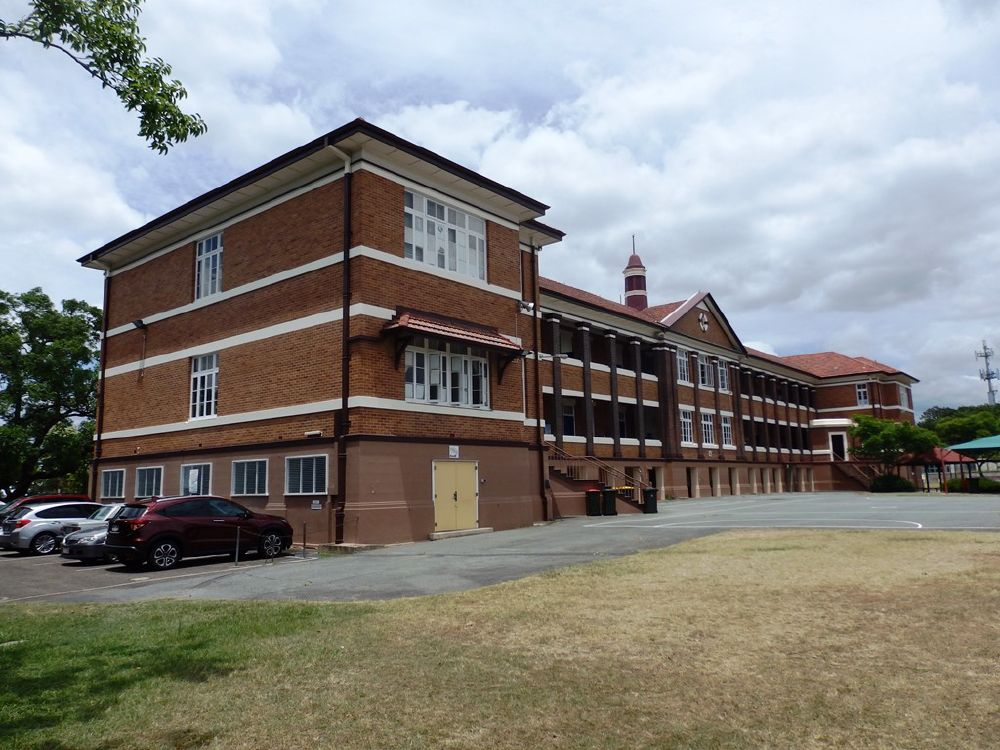
Rear of brick school building as seen from the school grounds, 2015

The building is elegantly composed with classical detailing. Constructed from load-bearing face brick walls, it has rendered decorative elements to the first and second floors, and a rendered base that forms the undercroft level. The red-brown brick walls of the first and second floors are laid in a stretcher bond, and are relieved with pilasters - rendered on the front elevation and English-bonded, brown face brick on the northern elevation. The pilasters have simple, rendered capitals. Along the front elevation, tiled window hoods with decorative timber brackets shelter the first storey windows; and two face brick projections protrude from the eastern and western ends of the range. The projections and entry bay are topped with rendered parapets, and rendered string courses run the length of the elevation. A foundation stone is set within the wall east of the entry bay, at the understorey level. Rendered detailing on the entrance bay includes ornamental scrolls, and the words "JUNCTION PARK STATE SCHOOL" in raised lettering. A gabled pediment on the northern side of the range has a face brick tympanum, which is rendered at its apex and has a centred, rendered accent circle.

The interior layout of the building is symmetrical. The ends of the range are terminated by stairwells and store rooms (former cloak rooms), and are flanked by toilets and store rooms (also former cloak rooms) and classrooms in the lateral wings. Aligned with the entry bay and in the centre of the range is a first floor foyer, centrally located between eastern and western office spaces, and a second floor classroom and office. Leadlight fanlights are located in the foyer; featuring the words "JUNCTION PARK" below the school's crest, with the school's house symbols to either side. A timber board listing the names of the school's principals since 1888 is also located in the foyer.

The remainder of the range, on both the first and second floors, comprises classrooms. Most classrooms throughout the building retain original partition bulkheads, which indicate the original layout, and latticed ceiling vents are retained on the second floor. Most classrooms and offices have plaster walls, timber-framed floors covered in recent carpet or linoleum, and flat-sheeted ceilings with timber battens. Skirtings are generally wide and plastered, and most classrooms retain picture rails. A raised timber stage has been constructed in a classroom at the eastern end of the first floor.

A timber honour board (1915) is located in the same classroom. It is stained dark brown and has a decorative frame that is stained in a lighter brown and has turned vertical supports. Featured at the head of the board is a photograph of a soldier, surrounded by the words, "1915; HONOUR BOARD; OUR BOYS SERVING AT THE FRONT; JUNCTION PARK STATE SCHOOL," and leaf patterns painted in gold. Below this are the names of 86 former students who served in World War I, also painted in gold.

Stairs are of polished and painted concrete, and their balustrades have timber handrails and metal balusters with timber posts. At the landing level between the undercroft and first floor, there are decorative metal screens in the openings to the stairwell.

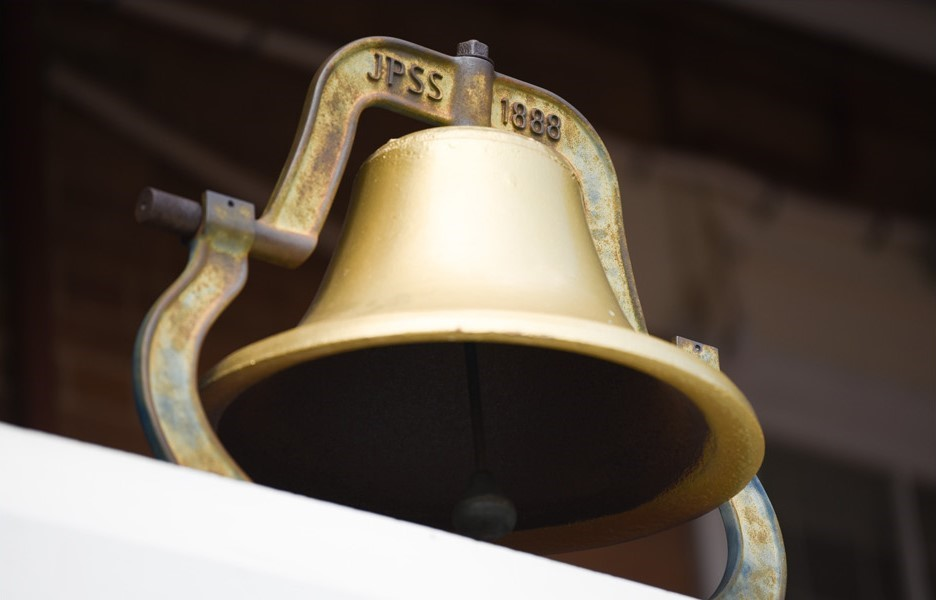
1988 school bell

Verandahs along the northern side of the range provide access to the first and second floor classrooms and offices. They have painted concrete floors and their ceilings are flat, with those on the second floor featuring timber battens. The brick balustrades have rendered copings, with concrete drains channelled along their base; the central sections are plastered and enclosed with early windows. Recent lightweight partitions enclose most ends of the verandahs to enlarge the lateral wings' classrooms, and are not of cultural heritage significance. A large, metal school bell is attached to the western balustrade of the first floor verandah. Its bracket is marked with "JPSS, 1888" in raised letters.

The undercroft level comprises open play-space, a modern tuckshop and storage space, with enclosed classrooms and storage spaces in the lateral wings. It has a concrete slab floor, with floors in some enclosed spaces covered in recent linoleum and carpet. Most ceilings are of flat sheeting, and timber framing is exposed within the range and the western wing. The piers are stop-chamfered, and timber seats supported by metal brackets are attached to some piers.

Early timber joinery is retained throughout the building, including: tall casement windows (to the exterior); double-hung sash windows (to the verandahs); arched casement windows (to the eastern and western range projections); panelled doors on the first floor; low-waisted French doors with arched fanlights (to the entrance bay); a high-waisted timber panelled door (to the tuckshop, 1953); and an interior French glazed door (between classrooms on the second floor). Most windows and doors have early awning fanlights; and most windows retain their early hardware with winding mechanisms. All rendered elements have been painted.

=== Swimming Pools (1910, 1929) and Timber Stands (pre-1944) ===
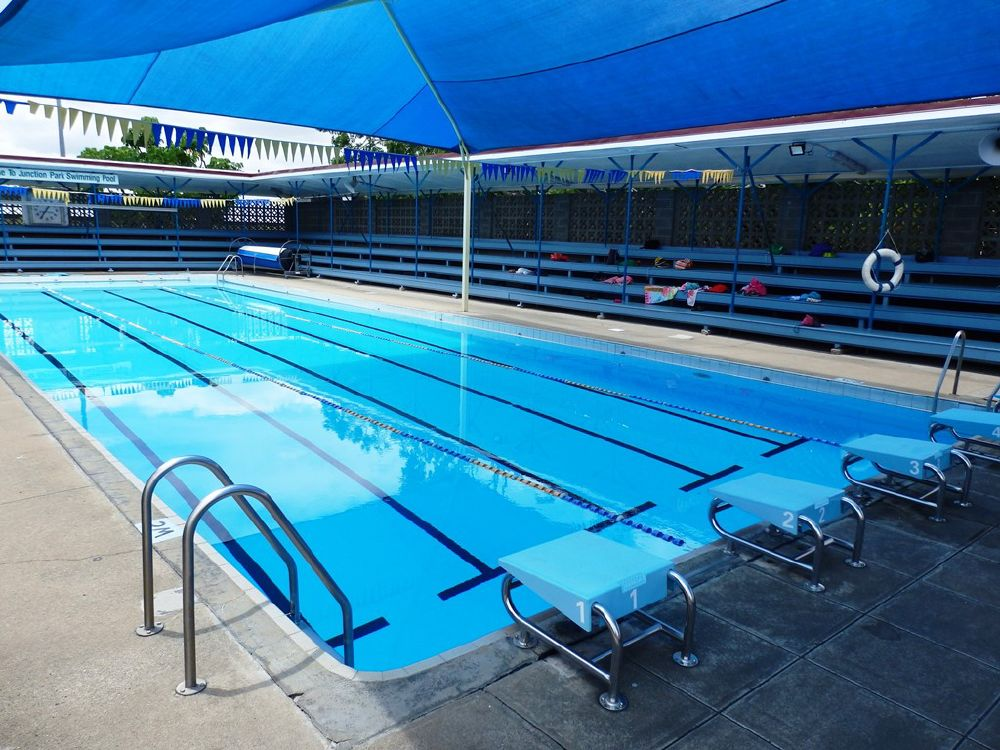
The larger 1929 swimming pool with stands, 2015

The swimming pool complex includes two rectangular, in-ground, concrete swimming pools and timber stands. The 1929 pool has slightly rounded corners. The complex is enclosed by early face brick and perforated concrete block walls to the south and east, a corrugated metal-clad timber-framed fence to the north, and a recent, face brick, changing room structure (2003, not significant) to the west. The oldest and smallest pool is the 1910 swimming pool, which runs on a north–south axis, measures 13 by 4.9 metres (43 ft × 16 ft), and is located west of the perpendicular, 1929 swimming pool, which measures 23 by 7.6 metres (75 ft × 25 ft). Both pools have tiled edges and concrete pavers around them. The stands comprise tiered, timber-framed seating that allow for the viewing of the 1929 swimming pool. The stands are sheltered by a metal-framed roof (1989) that is not of cultural heritage significance.

=== Toilet Blocks; Boys, Girls and Infants (former, 1934) ===
The boys, girls and infants toilet blocks are all one storey, rectangular, face brick structures that have corrugated metal-clad Dutch-gable roofs, V-jointed (VJ) timber soffits, and long axes running east–west. Triangular, timber ventilation panels are located within the gable apexes. Entrances to the blocks are from the northern and southern sides, and are screened by facebrick walls that have rounded corners at the entry points. Variance in brickwork colour indicates where some of these screens have been extended; in some cases, both in length and height. The brickwork of the exterior walls is exposed internally (some have been painted). The floors are concrete (with modern linings) and the ceilings are lined in VJ timber. Window openings are timber-framed and have tall sill heights. Most internal partitions have been altered and toilets have been replaced by modern units - these are not of cultural heritage significance.

=== Landscape elements ===
The school grounds are well established, and the formerly sloping site has been terraced to the west of Block A by several Depression-era concrete retaining walls that form levelled platforms. These retaining walls are located: west of Block A (running north–south), along the west, northwest and southwest boundaries of the oval, and along the western boundary of the site.

Many mature trees which appear to predate 1936, including some large figs (Ficus spp.), are located within the school grounds along the southern boundary of the site and the northern edge of the oval, plus individual mature trees are located south of the 1929 swimming pool, and north of Block B and the former infants toilet block.

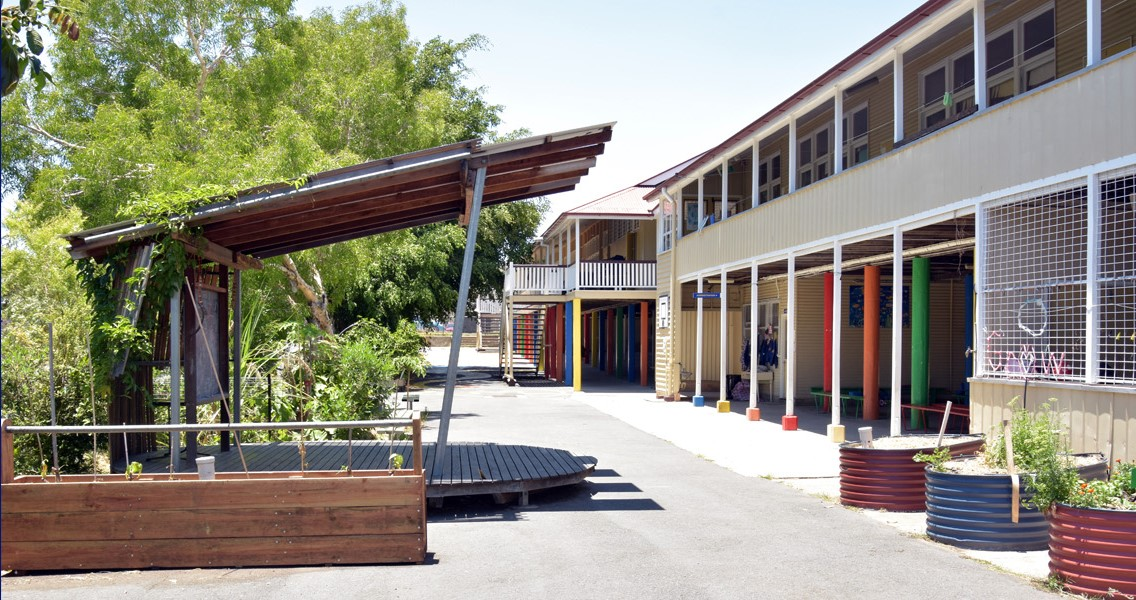
Timber school buildings on the Gowrie Street side of the school, 2025

=== Other Structures and Elements ===
An early concrete plinth is set on a square concrete base south of the swimming pool complex.

Modern partitions, joinery, buildings and sheds within the cultural heritage boundary are not of cultural heritage significance.

== Heritage listing ==
Junction Park State School was listed on the Queensland Heritage Register on 6 May 2016 having satisfied the following criteria.

The place is important in demonstrating the evolution or pattern of Queensland's history.

Junction Park State School (established in 1891) is important in demonstrating the evolution of state education and its associated architecture in Queensland. The place retains an excellent example of a government-designed Depression-era brick school building (1936), which was an architectural response to prevailing government educational philosophies and is set in landscaped grounds with sporting facilities and mature trees.

The Depression-era brick school building, toilet blocks and landscaping of the school grounds demonstrate the Queensland Government's building and relief work programs that, during the 1930s, stimulated the economy and provided work for men unemployed as a result of the Great Depression.

The two swimming pools (1910, 1929), the earliest of which was the first built in a Queensland state school, reflect the growing concern in the early 20th century to teach children to swim for health and safety reasons.

The World War I Honour Board (1915) located in the Depression-era brick school building is important in demonstrating the school community's involvement in a major world event.

The place is important in demonstrating the principal characteristics of a particular class of cultural places.

Junction Park State School is important in demonstrating the principal characteristics of a Queensland state school built during the Depression era. The school comprises a Depression-era brick school building, and brick toilet blocks (1934), constructed to a government design. These are set within a generous, landscaped site that retains mature shade trees, Depression-era retaining walls (c. 1935), and sporting facilities, including the early swimming pools and an oval.

The substantial Depression-era brick school building is an intact, excellent example of its type and retains a high degree of integrity. The building demonstrates the principal characteristics of its type, including its two-storey form, with an undercroft; symmetrical, high quality design that features classical detailing; loadbearing, face brick construction; hipped roof; and prominent central roof fleche. The building has a linear layout, with rooms accessed by verandahs, and an undercroft used as open play space. Typical of this building type, the Depression-era brick school building was located in a growing suburban area at the time of its construction.

The place is important because of its aesthetic significance.

Through its elegant composition of formal and decorative elements, substantial size, face brick exterior and high quality materials, the Depression-era brick school building at Junction Park State School has aesthetic significance due to its expressive attributes, by which the Department of Public Works sought to convey the concepts of progress and permanence.

The building's elegant composition, assertive massing and classically influenced design contribute to its dignified streetscape presence, and contrast with the surrounding small-scale residences.

The place has a strong or special association with a particular community or cultural group for social, cultural or spiritual reasons.

Schools have always played an important part in Queensland communities. They typically retain significant and enduring connections with former pupils, parents, and teachers; provide a venue for social interaction and volunteer work; and are a source of pride, symbolising local progress and aspirations.

Junction Park State School has a strong and ongoing association with the Annerley community. It was established in 1891 through the fundraising efforts of the local community and generations of Annerley children have been taught there. The place is important for its contribution to the educational development of Annerley and is a prominent community focal point and gathering place for social and commemorative events with widespread community support.

== Notable people ==
- Romeo Lahey, conservationist, attended the school
- Doug Sherrington, Member of the Queensland Legislative Assembly
