= Dibley =

Dibley may refer to:

- Dibley, the fictional English Oxfordshire village where sitcom The Vicar of Dibley is set, (not to be confused with the real Dibleys estate in Blewbury, South Oxfordshire)
- Mary Dibley (1883–1968), British film actress
- Colin Dibley (born 1946), Australian tennis player
- Janet Dibley (born 1958), English TV actress
- Thomas Dibley (1829-1912), member of the Queensland Legislative Assembly.
