= George Blocksidge =

Australian politician

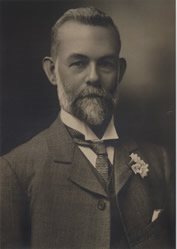

Member of the Queensland Legislative Assembly for Woolloongabba
- In office 18 May 1907 – 5 February 1908
- Preceded by: Thomas Dibley
- Succeeded by: David Hunter

Personal details
- Born: George Henry Blocksidge; 20 September 1855 Brisbane, Colony of New South Wales
- Died: 20 January 1944 (aged 88) Brisbane, Queensland, Australia
- Resting place: Balmoral Cemetery
- Party: Ministerial
- Other political affiliations: Labour
- Spouse: Kate Georgina Bell (m.1880 d.1943)
- Occupation: Real estate agent

George Henry Blocksidge (20 September 1855 – 20 January 1944) was a member of the Queensland Legislative Assembly.

== Biography ==
Blocksidge was born at Brisbane, Queensland, the son of the William Blocksidge and his wife Esther (née Shelly). He was educated at Brisbane State Schools and became a real estate agent.

On 3 November 1880 he married Kate Georgina Bell (died 1943) at Ipswich and together had two sons and five daughters, one of which was the well-known poet William Baylebridge. He died in January 1944 and his funeral proceeded from Quambathella, his East Brisbane residence to the Balmoral Cemetery.

== Public life ==
Blocksidge was mayor of South Brisbane in 1903 before winning the seat of Woolloongabba for the Opposition Party at the 1907 Queensland state election, defeating the sitting member Thomas Dibley. He held the seat until the special state election held the following year when he was beaten by the Ministerial candidate, David Hunter.

| Preceded by Thomas Dibley | Member for Woolloongabba; 1907–1908 | Succeeded by David Hunter |
