= David Hunter (Queensland politician) =

Australian politician

Member of the Queensland Legislative Assembly for Woolloongabba
- In office 5 February 1908 – 27 April 1912
- Preceded by: George Blocksidge
- Succeeded by: Seat abolished

Personal details
- Born: David Hunter; 16 November 1858 Glasgow, Scotland
- Died: 20 September 1927 (aged 68) East Brisbane, Queensland, Australia
- Resting place: Bulimba Cemetery
- Party: Ministerial
- Other political affiliations: Opposition
- Spouse: Elizabeth Clark
- Occupation: Carpenter, Scaffolding inspector

David Hunter (16 November 1858 – 20 September 1927) was an Australian politician. He was the conservative member for Woolloongabba in the Legislative Assembly of Queensland from 1908 to 1912.

Hunter is buried in Bulimba Cemetery.

Parliament of Queensland
Preceded by George Blockslidge	Member for Woolloongabba; 1908–1912	Abolished
