= William Baylebridge =

Australian poet (1883–1942)

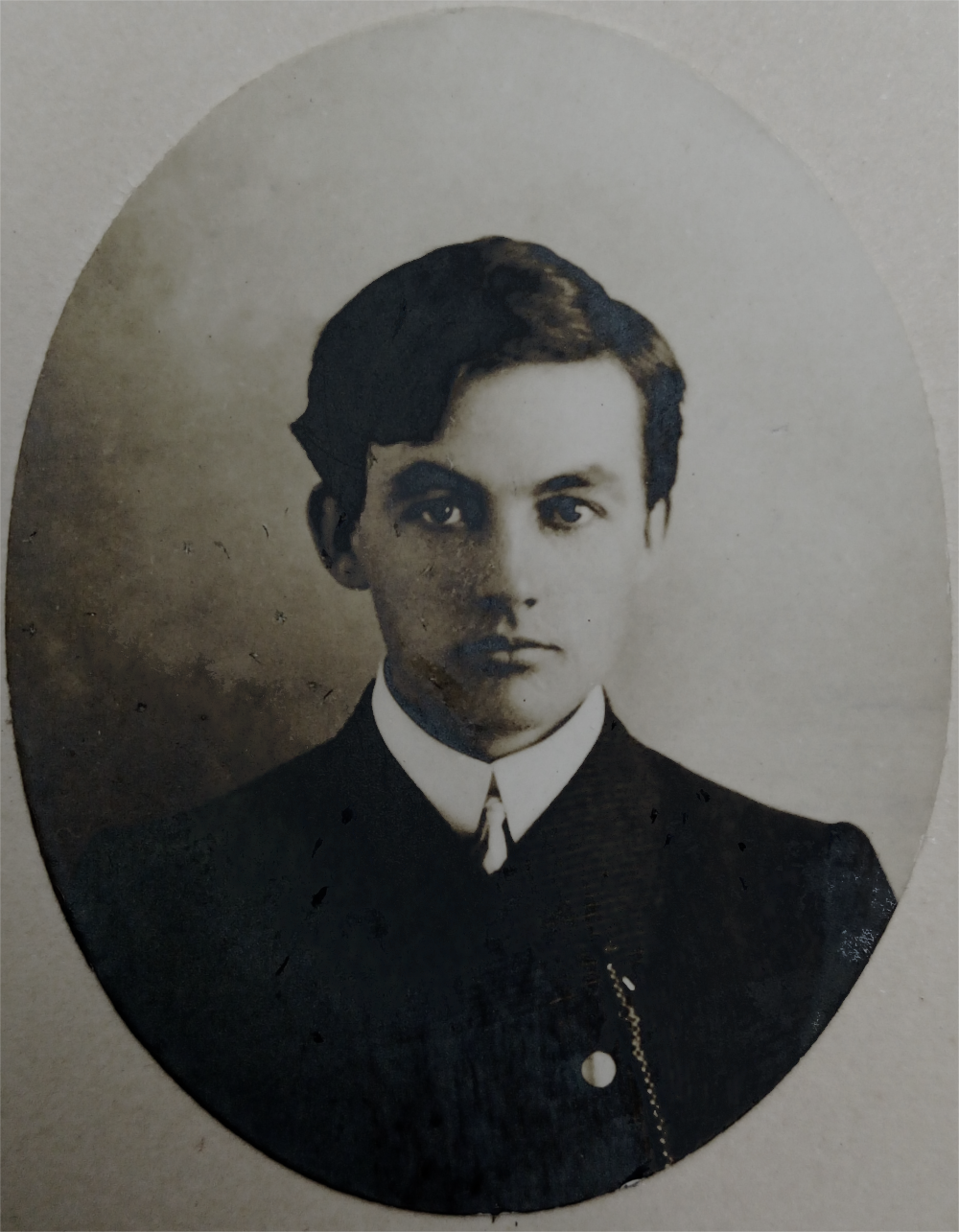
- The only known photo of William Baylebridge, taken when the poet was a young man (c. 1908)
- Born: Charles William Blocksidge; 12 December 1883; Brisbane, Queensland
- Died: 7 May 1942 (aged 58); Sydney, New South Wales
- Occupations: Poet, writer, and political theorist

William Baylebridge (12 December 1883 – 7 May 1942), born Charles William Blocksidge, was an Australian writer, poet, and political theorist.

== Early life ==
Baylebridge was born in Brisbane, Queensland, the son of George Henry Blocksidge. He studied at Brisbane Grammar School, then under a private tutor, the classicist David Owen.

== Years in England ==
In 1908, he sailed to London with his friend (and future brother-in-law) Robert Graham Brown. He travelled extensively throughout the Continent, absorbing much of the intellectual milieu of that period. At that same time, he published several volumes of juvenilia, starting with Songs o’ the South in 1908, which was published by the secularist Charles Albert Watts. These early works were generally poorly received, and later, in order to dissociate himself from the embarrassment of having produced them, Blocksidge adopted the name ‘William Baylebridge’, both personally and professionally, in around 1925.

While living in London, Baylebridge also published his earliest statements of fascist political theory, in both verse and aphoristic prose. These works were The New Life (1910) and National Notes (1913), both of which advanced a form of proto-fascism he called the ‘New Nationalism’, thus preceding the Italian movement by several years. In this regard, he was influenced primarily by British interpreters of Nietzsche, particularly the British eugenicists, notably John Davidson and George Bernard Shaw, as well as the Italian writer and revolutionary Gabriele D’Annunzio. He remained in Europe until 1919.

== Return to Australia and later life ==
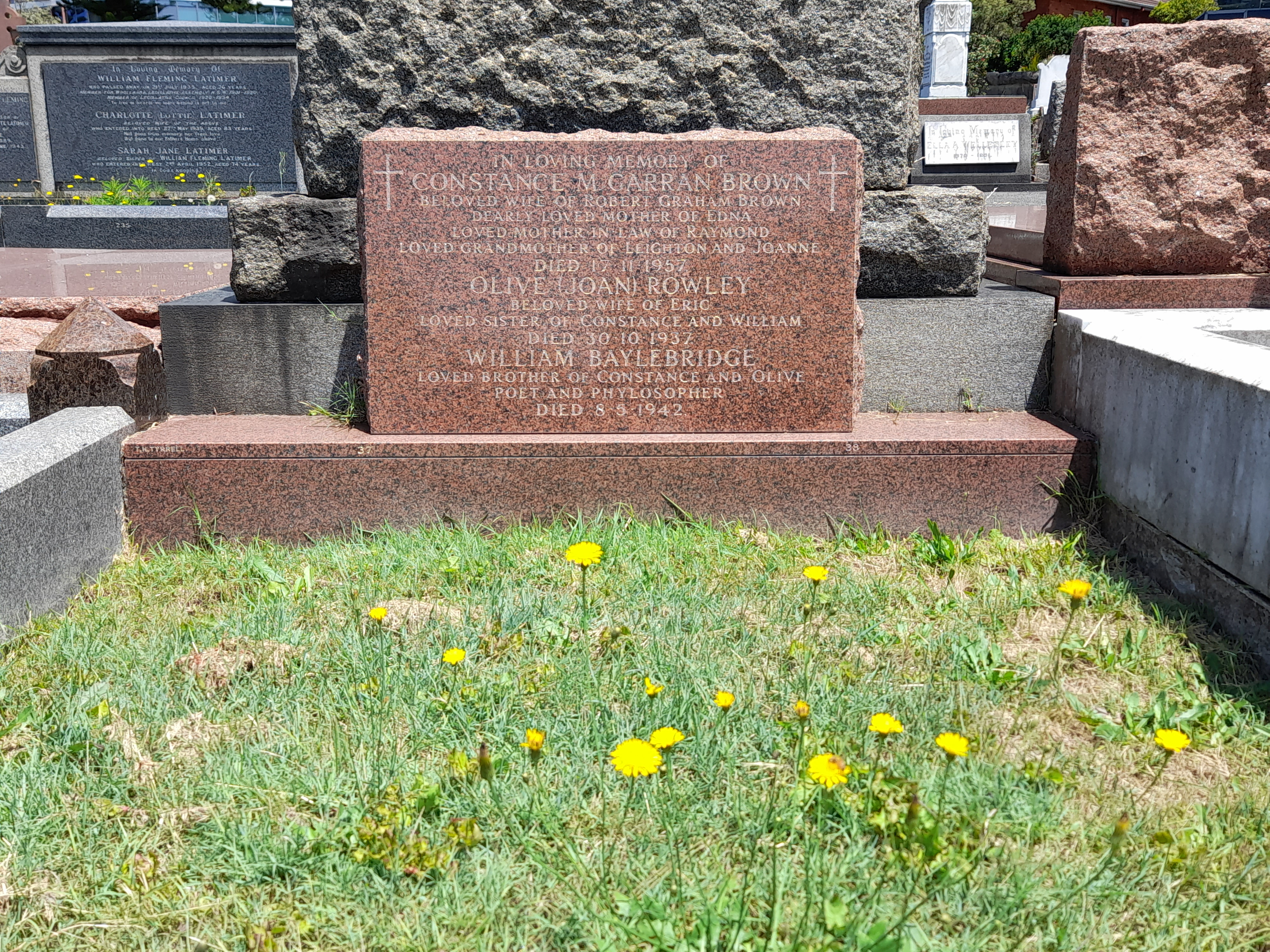
William Baylebridge's grave, South Head Cemetery, Sydney

When he returned to Australia in 1919, after over a decade abroad, he quickly moved to Sydney, where he divided his time between the city and a cottage in Blackheath. That same year, he released his first Australian publication, Selected Poems, which was published in Brisbane by Gordon & Gotch, partly through the help of a circle of Melbourne writers which included Nettie Palmer and Frank Wilmot. Shortly afterwards, he published his first novel, An Anzac Muster (1921), in London, possibly—as with his other English publications—with the help of a relative, the printer Edwin Blocksidge (Daily Telegraph, 3 November 1934, pp. 5).

Baylebridge founded Tallabila Press in 1934. From this imprint he published new works, such as Love Redeemed (1934), as well as reissuing older texts, such as the third edition of National Notes (1936). Reissues of National Notes and This Vital Flesh (1939) were assisted by P. R. Stephensen, who also edited the four-volume posthumous collected works of Baylebridge, published by Angus & Robertson (1961-1964).

For the rest of his life, Baylebridge consciously cultivated the air of a mysterious and reclusive prophet-poet. This involved not only the archaic style of his poetry and prose, but also his eschewing of all forms of conventional publicity. He rarely published in anthologies; he refused to sit for portraits (despite several offers); he also refused, when asked, to speak at public events.

Baylebridge died on 7 May 1942. He is buried in South Head Cemetery. He never married and had no children.

== Reception ==
Though he was considered one of the premier poets of his day, critical opinion of Baylebridge has since waned considerably. On balance, the critic Firmin McKinnon probably put it best: "[Baylebridge's] outstanding fault is his obscurity, much of which, one fears, was deliberate and artificial. That is a pity for unquestionably he had poetic genius. Because of his affectation and obscurity his poetry will remain only for that select few who are willing to plod their way across tedious stretches of aridity in the hope of finding a few rare exotic blooms in places unfrequented by the ordinary seeker of Truth and Beauty."

== Bibliography ==
- Songs o' the South (1908)
- Australia to England and other verses (1909)
- Moreton Miles (1910)
- Southern Songs (1910)
- A Northern Trail (1910)
- The New Life: A National Tract (to the men of Australia) (1910)
- National Notes (1913)
- Life's Testament: Songs from the Hill of the seven echoes (1914)
- Seven Tales (1916)
- A Wreath (1916)
- Selected Poems (1919)
- An Anzac Muster (1921)
- National Notes (Second ed.) (1922)
- Love Redeemed (1934)
- National Notes (Third ed.) (1936)
- Life's Testament (Second ed.) (1939)
- Sextains (1939)
- This Vital Flesh (1939) - Awarded the 1940 ALS Gold Medal
- Moreton Miles (Second ed.) (1941)
- This Vital Flesh (1961) - Collected Works Volume 1
- An Anzac Muster (Second ed.) (1962) - Collected Works Volume 2
- The Growth of Love (1963) - Collected Works Volume 3
- Salvage (1964) - Collected Works Volume 4
