= Electoral district of Woolloongabba =

Former state electoral district of Queensland, Australia

Woolloongabba Queensland—Legislative Assembly
- State: Queensland
- Created: 1888
- Abolished: 1912
- Namesake: Woolloongabba
- Demographic: Metropolitan
- Coordinates: 27°29′S 153°02′E

The electoral district of Woolloongabba was a Legislative Assembly electorate in the state of Queensland, Australia.

== History ==
Woolloongabba was created in the 1887 redistribution, taking effect at the 1888 colonial election. It was located in south Brisbane based on Kangaroo Point.

Woolloongabba was abolished at the 1912 state election, changing only marginally to become the Electoral district of Maree.

== Members ==
The following people were elected in the seat of Woolloongabba:

Member	Party	Term
William Stephens	Ministerial / Opposition	12 May 1888 – 28 Mar 1896
Thomas Dibley	Labor / Ministerial	28 Mar 1896 – 18 May 1907
George Blocksidge	Opposition	18 May 1907 – 5 Feb 1908
David Hunter	Opposition / Ministerial	5 Feb 1908 – 27 Apr 1912

== See also ==
- Electoral districts of Queensland
- Members of the Queensland Legislative Assembly by year
- Category:Members of the Queensland Legislative Assembly by name
