= Alec Lamont =

Australian politician

Alexander Lamont

Member of the Queensland Legislative Assembly for Brisbane South
- In office 11 March 1902 – 27 August 1904
- Preceded by: Harry Turley
- Succeeded by: William Reinhold

Personal details
- Born: Alexander James Lamont; 8 February 1850 Cheshire, England
- Died: 27 June 1934 (aged 84) Brisbane, Queensland, Australia
- Resting place: Mt Gravatt Cemetery
- Party: Ministerialist
- Spouse(s): Ellen Bannister, Harriet Grindley Daniels (d.1922)
- Occupation: Barrister

Alexander James "Alec" Lamont (8 February 1850 – 27 June 1934) was a barrister and a member of the Queensland Legislative Assembly.

Lamont was born in Cheshire, England, to parents Charles Gordon Lamont and his wife Christiana (née James). He first commenced his legal service in Sydney in 1876 and in 1898 was working as a barrister in Brisbane. Later on he was the manager of Webster & Co before joining the Union Trustee Co. and the Bengal Chutney Co.

== Political career ==
Lamont was a member of the Legislative Assembly of Queensland, holding the seat of South Brisbane from 1902 until his defeat at the 1904 state election. He had also served on the Brisbane Water and Sewerage Board and was a Trustee of the South Brisbane Cemetery Board.

== Personal life ==
Lamont married Ellen Bannister in London and later married Harriet Grindley Daniels in Liverpool and together had three sons and three daughters. Lamont died in Brisbane in June 1934 and his funeral proceeded from Talavera, his former residence at Wellington Point to the Mt Gravatt Cemetery.

Parliament of Queensland
Preceded by Harry Turley	Member for Brisbane South; 1902–1904	Succeeded by William Reinhold
