= Electoral district of South Brisbane =

State electoral district of Queensland, Australia

South Brisbane Queensland—Legislative Assembly
- Electoral map of South Brisbane, 2017
- State: Queensland
- Created: 1860
- MP: Barbara O'Shea
- Party: Labor
- Namesake: South Brisbane
- Electors: 38,892 (2020)
- Area: 12 km^{2} (4.6 sq mi)
- Coordinates: 27°29′S 153°2′E
Electorates around South Brisbane:
Cooper	McConnel	Bulimba
Maiwar	South Brisbane	Greenslopes
Maiwar	Miller	Greenslopes

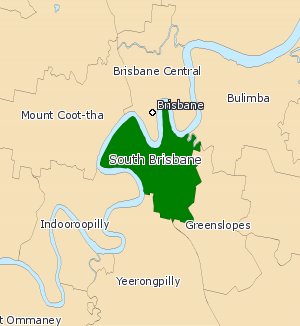
Electoral map of South Brisbane 2008

South Brisbane, also known as Brisbane South, is an electoral district of the Legislative Assembly of Queensland. The electorate encompasses suburbs in Brisbane's inner-south, stretching from East Brisbane to West End, and south to Annerley. Parts of Greenslopes and Coorparoo are also located in the electorate.

South Brisbane is Queensland's oldest electorate, being the only one of the original 16 districts to have been contested at every election. It has generally been considered a safe seat for the Labor Party since 1915, but has in recent election cycles shifted in favour of the Greens. It has only been lost by the Labor party on four occasions: the Country and Progressive National Party's 1929 landslide victory; after the 1957 Labor split, when Premier of Queensland and sitting member Vince Gair quit the party to form the Queensland Labor Party; in 1974, at the height of the Bjelke-Petersen government's popularity; and in 2020 when Jackie Trad lost to the Greens. Anna Bligh, former Premier of Queensland, held the seat from 1995 until her resignation in 2012 after Labor's defeat at the 2012 state election on 24 March. She was succeeded by fellow Labor member Jackie Trad, who became Deputy Premier in 2015. Trad held the seat until 2020, when Greens candidate Amy MacMahon defeated her at the second attempt. In 2024, Barbara O'Shea unseated MacMahon.

== Members ==
First incarnation (1860–1878, 1 member)
Member	Party	Term
Henry Richards	Unaligned	1860–1863
Thomas Blacket Stephens	Unaligned	1863–1875
Richard Ash Kingsford	Unaligned	1875–1878
Second incarnation (1878–1912, 2 members)
Member	Party	Term
Richard Ash Kingsford	Unaligned	1878–1883
Angus Mackay	Unaligned	1878–1880
Simon Fraser	Unaligned	1880–1888
Henry Jordan	Unaligned	1883–1888
Henry Jordan	Unaligned	1888–1890
Abraham Luya	Unaligned	1888–1893
Arthur Morry	Unaligned	1890–1893
Harry Turley	Labour	1893–1899
Charles Midson	Ministerialist	1893–1896
William Stephens	Ministerialist	1896–1904
Abraham Luya	Unaligned	1899
Harry Turley	Labour	1899–1902
Alec Lamont	Ministerialist	1902–1904
William Reinhold	Labour	1904–1907
Thomas Bouchard	Ministerialist/Opposition	1904–1908
William Stephens	Opposition	1907–1908
Peter Airey	Kidstonites	1908
Peter Airey	Independent Opposition	1908–1909
John Huxham	Labour	1908–1909
Thomas Bouchard	Liberal	1909–1912
James Allan	Liberal	1909–1912
Third incarnation (1912–present, 1 member)
Member	Party	Term
Thomas Bouchard	Liberal	1912–1915
Edgar Free	Labor	1915–1920
Myles Ferricks	Labor	1920–1929
Neil MacGroarty	Country and Progressive National	1929–1932
Vince Gair	Labor	1932–1957
Vince Gair	Queensland Labor	1957–1960
Col Bennett	Labor	1960–1972
Fred Bromley	Labor	1972–1974
Colin Lamont	Liberal	1974–1977
Jim Fouras	Labor	1977–1986
Anne Warner	Labor	1986–1995
Anna Bligh	Labor	1995–2012
Jackie Trad	Labor	2012–2020
Amy MacMahon	Greens	2020–2024
Barbara O'Shea	Labor	2024–present

== Election results ==
2024 Queensland state election: South Brisbane
Party	Candidate	Votes	%	±%
Greens	Amy MacMahon	12,146	34.71	−3.19
Labor	Barbara O'Shea	11,192	31.99	−2.41
Liberal National	Marita Parkinson	10,472	29.93	+7.13
One Nation	Richard Henderson	1,179	3.37	+1.57
Total formal votes		34,989	97.56	+0.14
Informal votes		874	2.44	−0.14
Turnout		35,863	86.04	−1.94
Two-candidate-preferred result
Labor	Barbara O'Shea	19,613	56.05	+11.40
Greens	Amy MacMahon	15,376	43.95	−11.40
Labor gain from Greens		Swing	+11.40	
