= Harry Turley =

Australian politician

The Honourable Harry Turley
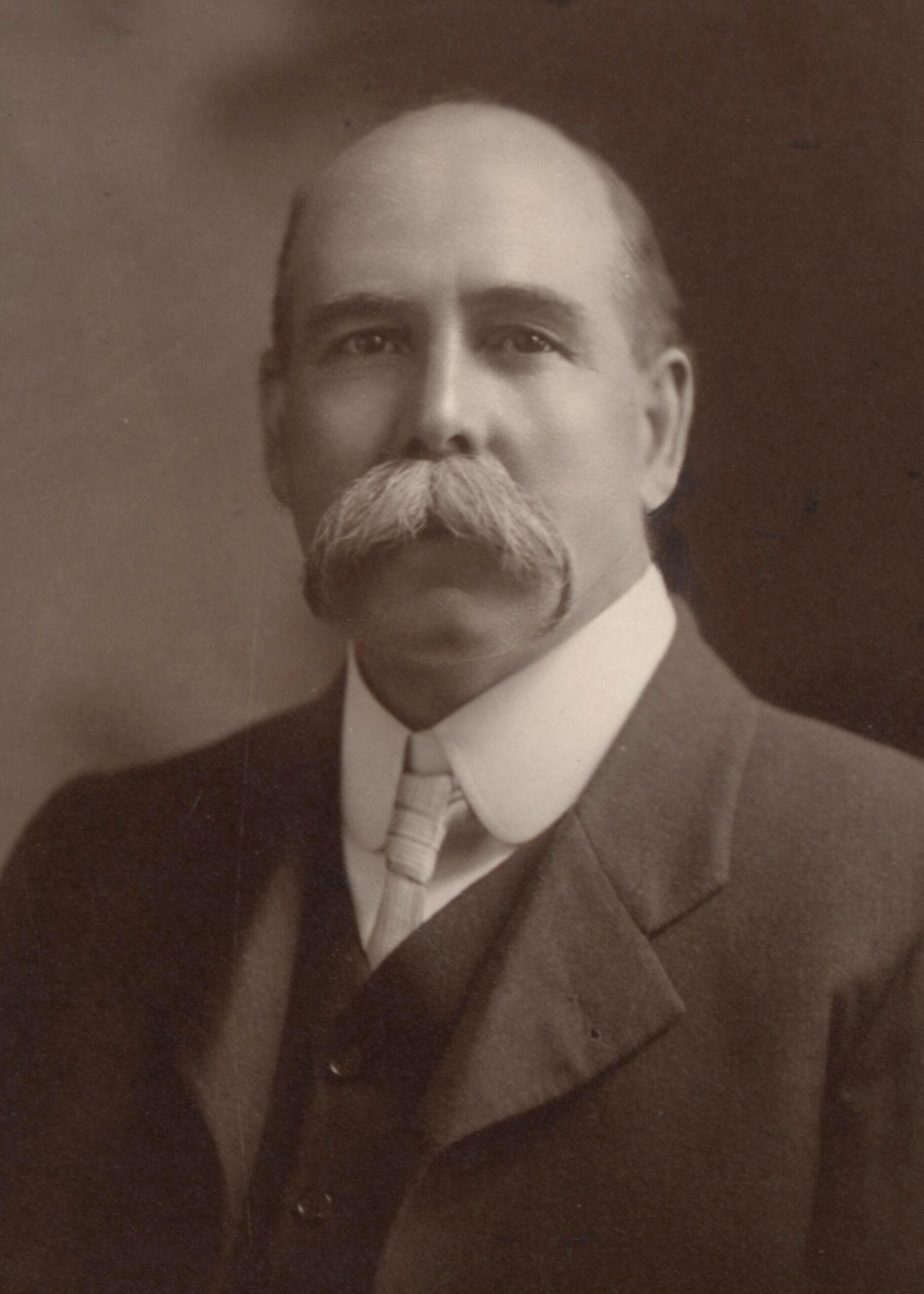

President of the Senate
- In office 1 July 1910 – 8 July 1913
- Preceded by: Albert Gould
- Succeeded by: Thomas Givens

Senator for Queensland
- In office 1 January 1904 – 30 June 1917

Member of the Queensland Legislative Assembly for South Brisbane
- In office 6 May 1893 – 11 March 1899
- Preceded by: Abraham Luya
- Succeeded by: Abraham Luya
- In office 22 July 1899 – 11 March 1902
- Preceded by: Abraham Luya
- Succeeded by: Alec Lamont

Personal details
- Born: Joseph Henry Lewis Turley; 24 April 1859 Gloucestershire, England
- Died: 5 June 1929 (aged 70) South Brisbane, Queensland, Australia
- Resting place: South Brisbane Cemetery
- Party: Australian Labor Party
- Spouse: Mary Smith (m.1886 d.1947)
- Occupation: Waterside worker

Joseph Henry Lewis Turley (24 April 1859 – 5 June 1929) was an Australian politician and trade unionist. He was a member of the Australian Labor Party (ALP) and served as a Senator for Queensland from 1904 to 1917, including as president of the Senate from 1910 to 1913. He had previously been a member of the Queensland Legislative Assembly.

== Early life ==
Turley was born on 24 April 1859 in Gloucester, England. He was the son of Agnes (née Oliver) and Charles Turley; his father was a master shoemaker.

Turley was educated in Brixham and went to sea at a young age. He arrived in Australia in 1879 and found work in Brisbane as a wharf labourer. He joined the Wharf Labourers' Union and eventually became secretary and president. During the 1890 maritime dispute, he was a member of the intercolonial defence committee organised by William Spence. He also represented the Queensland Shearers' Union as a delegate to negotiating conferences in Sydney during the 1891 shearers' strike.

== State politics ==
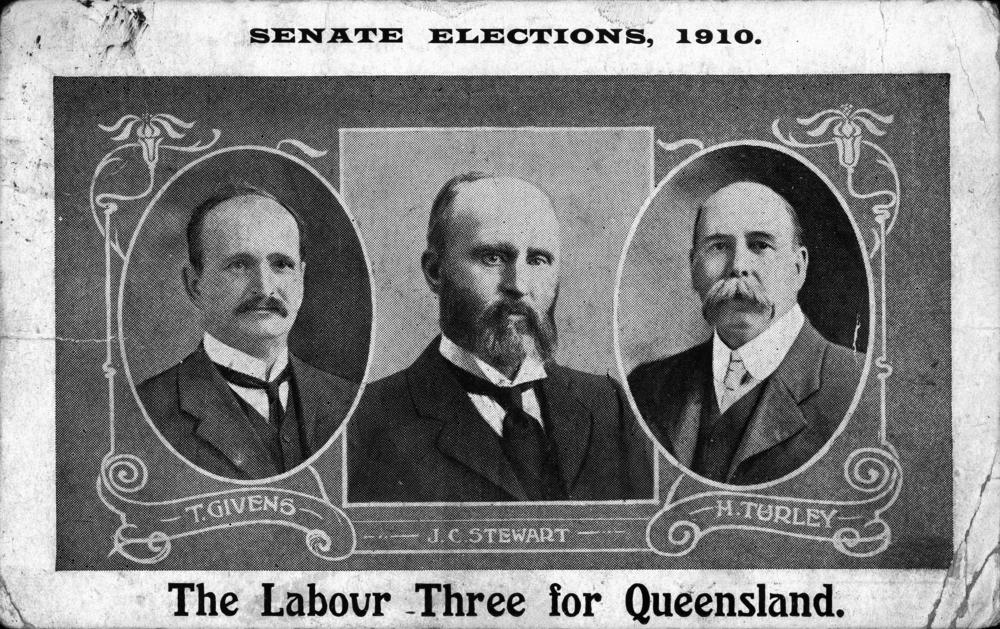
1910 Labor Senate ticket, with Turley on right

Turley was elected to the Queensland Legislative Assembly at the 1893 general election, winning the seat of South Brisbane for the Labor Party. In 1894 he helped re-establish the Socialist League in Brisbane alongside John Bond and Ernest Henry Lane.

Turley was re-elected in South Brisbane at the 1896 election, but lost his seat to Abraham Luya at the 1899 election. Luya died in office a few months later and Turley won back his seat at the resulting by-election by a margin of only three votes. In December 1899 he served as home secretary in Anderson Dawson's government, which lasted only a single week.

== Federal politics ==
Turley first stood for federal parliament at the inaugural federal election in 1901, unsuccessfully standing for the ALP in the House of Representatives seat of Oxley. He was elected to the Senate at the 1903 federal election.

On 1 July 1910, he was appointed President of the Senate, a position he held until 8 July 1913. He remained a Senator until his defeat in 1917.

Turley lost his seat at the 1917 federal election, with his term ending on 30 June 1917. He made unsuccessful attempts to regain his seat at the 1919 and 1925 elections.

== Personal life ==
Turley married Mary Smith in 1886, with whom he had four children.

After leaving politics, Turley became a shipping master with the Queensland Harbours and Rivers Department. Turley died in 1929 and was buried in South Brisbane Cemetery.

Parliament of Australia
Preceded by Albert Gould	President of the Senate; 1910–1913	Succeeded by Thomas Givens
Parliament of Queensland
Preceded by Abraham Luya	Member for South Brisbane; 1893–1899	Succeeded by Abraham Luya
Preceded by Abraham Luya	Member for South Brisbane; 1899–1902	Succeeded by Alec Lamont
