= Arthur Morry =

Australian politician

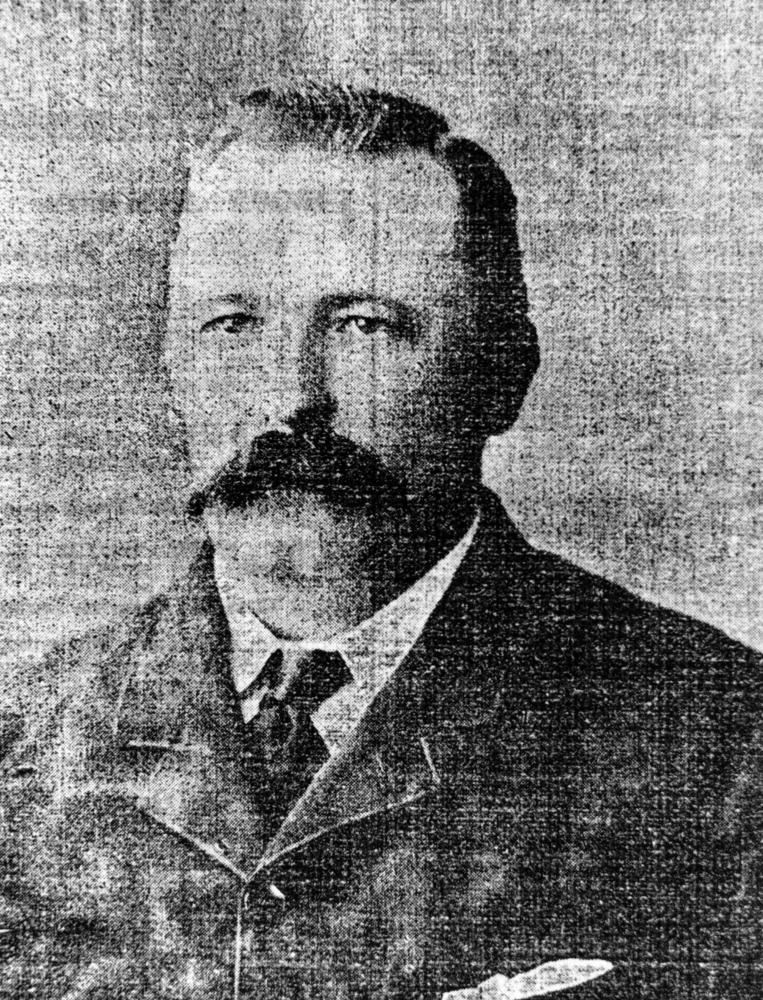
- Arthur Morry, 1890

Member of the Queensland Legislative Assembly for South Brisbane
- In office 17 July 1890 – 6 May 1893
- Preceded by: Henry Jordan
- Succeeded by: Harry Turley

Personal details
- Born: Arthur Morry; 4 January 1854 Moreton Say, Shropshire, England
- Died: 25 May 1938 (aged 84) Brisbane, Queensland, Australia
- Resting place: South Brisbane Cemetery
- Spouse: Mina Maurer (m.1900 d.1960)
- Occupation: Architect

Arthur Morry (4 January 1854 – 25 May 1938) was an English architect. In 1884 he emigrated to Australia where he became a member of the Queensland Legislative Assembly.

== Early years ==
Morry was born in Moreton Say, Shropshire, England, to John Morry and his wife Emma (née Mytton). Educated at Moreton National School and the Academy at Oswestry, he was articled to Spaull, an architect of Oswestry in 1869 before travelling to Manchester in 1873. For two years from 1875, Morry worked in Wales before returning to Manchester to carry on his work in architecture. He travelled to Brisbane in 1884 and for the period 1885–1886 he was employed by the Colonel Architect's Department and later on was a staff officer at the Department of Agriculture.

== Political career ==
Morry was a member of the Legislative Assembly of Queensland, holding the seat of South Brisbane from 1890 but decided not to stand for reelection at the 1893 colonial election. He was also an alderman in the South Brisbane Municipal Council, serving as its mayor in 1890.

== Personal life ==
In 1900 Morry married Mina Maurer (died 1960) and together had three sons and three daughters. Morry died in May 1938 and his funeral proceeded from the West End Methodist Church to the South Brisbane Cemetery.

== Nassagaweya ==
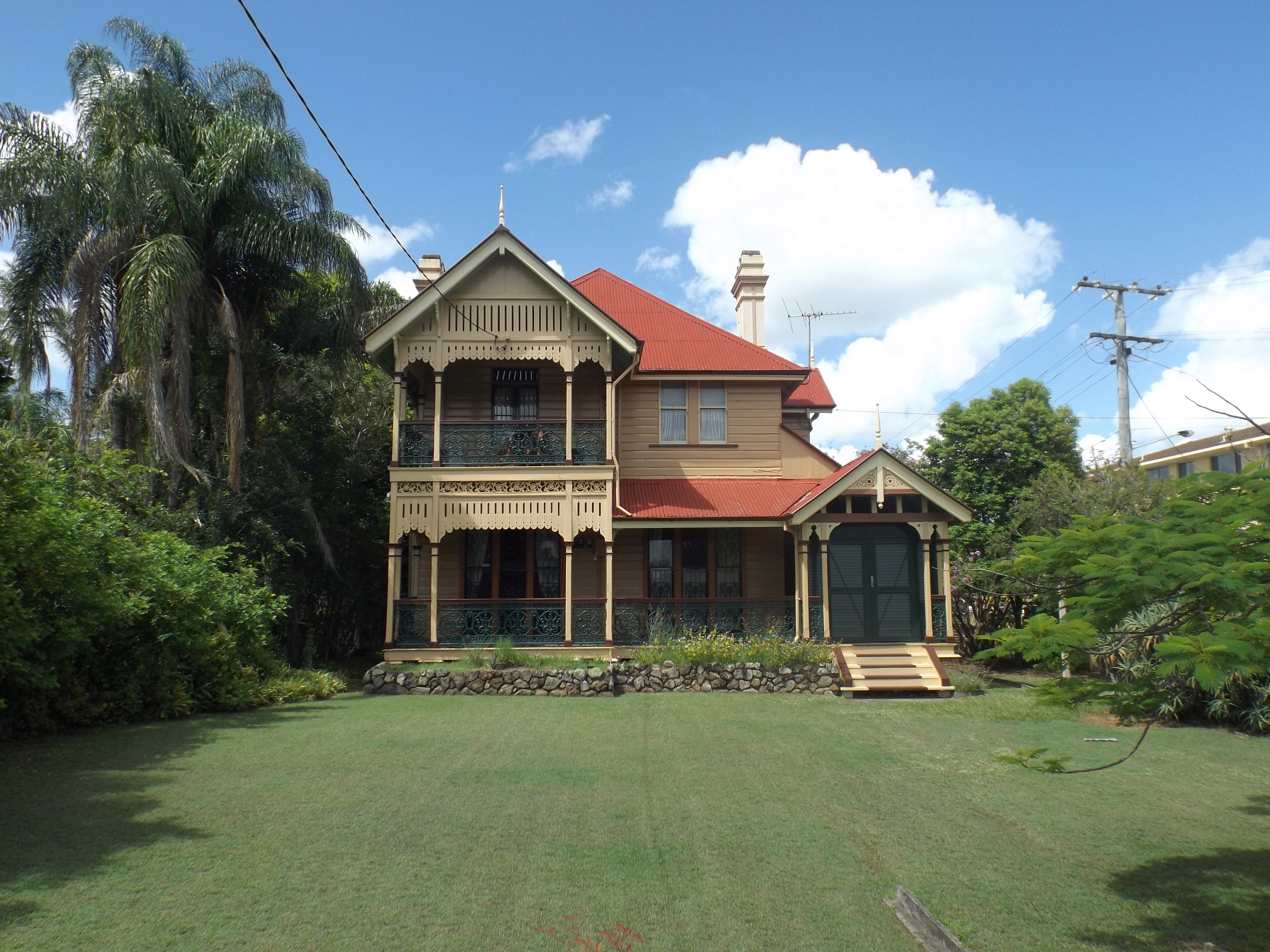
Nassagaweya and front lawn, 2015

Morry designed his own house Nassagaweya, which is now a heritage-listed detached house at 37 Gray Road, West End, Brisbane, Queensland, Australia.

Parliament of Queensland
Preceded by Henry Jordan	Member for South Brisbane; 1890–1893	Succeeded by Harry Turley
