= William Stephens (Australian politician) =

Australian politician

The Hon William Stephens
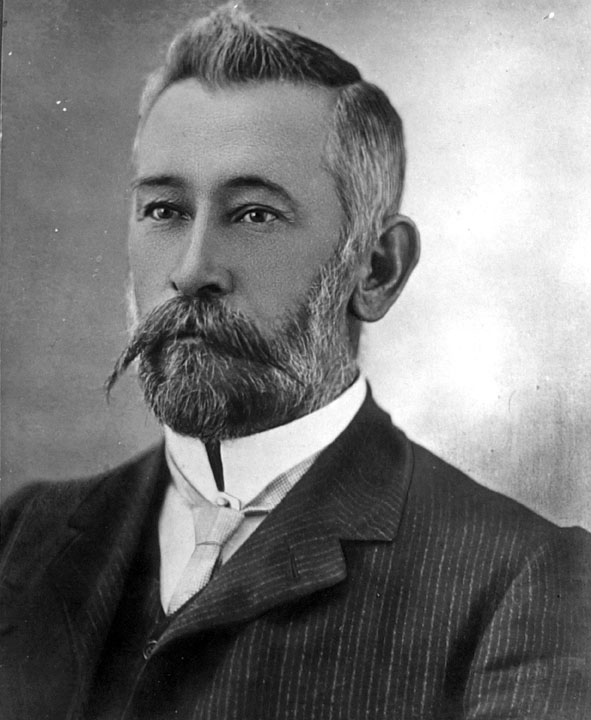
- The Hon William Stephens, Minister for Public Instruction, 1907

Member of the Queensland Legislative Assembly for Woolloongabba
- In office 12 May 1888 – 28 March 1896
- Preceded by: New seat
- Succeeded by: Thomas Dibley

Member of the Queensland Legislative Assembly for South Brisbane
- In office 28 March 1896 – 28 August 1904
- Preceded by: Charles Midson
- Succeeded by: William Reinhold
- In office 18 May 1907 – 5 February 1908
- Preceded by: William Reinhold
- Succeeded by: Peter Airey

Member of the Queensland Legislative Council
- In office 1 July 1912 – 23 March 1922

Personal details
- Born: William Stephens; 7 November 1857 South Brisbane, Colony of New South Wales
- Died: 30 April 1925 (aged 67) Southport, Queensland, Australia
- Resting place: South Brisbane Cemetery
- Party: Ministerial
- Other political affiliations: Opposition
- Spouse: Pauline Ann Caroline Effey
- Relations: Thomas Blacket Stephens (father)
- Occupation: Company director

William Stephens (1857–1925) was a businessman and politician in Queensland, Australia. He was a Member of the Queensland Legislative Assembly and a Member of the Queensland Legislative Council.

== Early life ==
William Stephens was born on 7 November 1857 at South Brisbane, the eldest son of Thomas Blacket Stephens and his wife Ann (née Connah), and raised at the family home of Cumbooquepa on Vulture Street, South Brisbane. He was educated at the National Public School, then the Brisbane Grammar School.

Commencing as a merchant, he took over the family estate on the death of his father.

He married Pauline Ann Caroline Effey in March 1900, and they had three sons and three daughters: Thomas Blacket (1902–), William (1909–), and Edward Harry (1916–1916); Dorothea Louise (1901–), Ann Pauline (1905–1984), and Marian Victoria (1907–).

From 20 acres (8.1 ha) of land transferred to Stephens by his father in 1886, Stephens built the family residence of Waldheim, off Ipswich Road, Annerley (now 35 Waldheim Street), about 1900 at the cost of €300; 'Waldheim' being a German word for 'home in the forest'. (It is now a Brisbane City Council designated local heritage place.)

== Politics ==
In 1882 he was elected as a member of the Yeerongpilly Divisional Board, and later, for thirty-six years, the Nerang Divisional Board (later the Nerang Shire Council). In 1887 he was elected president of the Metropolitan Traffic Board, and also became an alderman of the south ward, Brisbane. The South and Woolloongabba boards were merged the following year to become the City of South Brisbane, where he became the first mayor, in 1888, 1889, and 1901.

Stephens was elected on 12 May 1888 to the Queensland Legislative Assembly in Woolloongabba. In the 1893 colonial election, he successfully contested the seat of South Brisbane which he held until 27 August 1904, when he was defeated in the 1904 state election. He contested South Brisbane again in the 1907 election and was successfully, representing the electorate from 18 May 1907 to 5 February 1908, when he was again defeated in the 1908 election. During this last period, he was Secretary for Public Instruction and Agriculture from 19 November 1907 to 18 February 1908.

In the 1912 election, Stephens unsuccessfully contested Buranda.

On 1 July 1912, he was appointed for life to the Queensland Legislative Council, a position he held until the Council was abolished on 23 March 1922.

== Business interests ==
Stephens had many business interests in South Brisbane and other areas, including:

- Kingston Butter Factory
- South Brisbane Co-operative Dairy Company
- dairy farm Merrimac, at Nerang (now Merrimac).

== Later life ==
Following ill health late in life, Stephens collapsed from a stroke while holidaying at Southport, Queensland on Monday 27 April 1925. He was taken to a private hospital where he died on Thursday 30 April 1925. His funeral left his home Waldheim on Friday 1 May 1925 for his burial at South Brisbane Cemetery. Many prominent citizens attended his funeral.

His brother Thomas Connah Stephens (1868–1937) lived in the same street at Knutsford, on the corner of Waldheim and Blacket Streets.

Stephens also donated a block of land 'to be held in perpetuity for the scout movement' at 63 Waldheim Street, almost opposite the Junction Park State School, upon which was erected a 40 by 32 feet (12.2 m × 9.8 m) two-storey building costing £331, which was opened on Saturday 7 December 1929. It was for the use of the Stephens Boy Scout and Tarragindi Girl Guide groups; Stephens being the locale named for Stephens' father, and Tarragindi being an adjoining suburb. It is now a private residence.

His wife Pauline died on 2 August 1960, aged 85.

Parliament of Queensland
New seat	Member for Woolloongabba; 1888–1896	Succeeded by Thomas Dibley
Preceded by Charles Midson	Member for South Brisbane; 1896–1904	Succeeded by William Reinhold
Preceded by William Reinhold	Member for South Brisbane; 1907–1908	Succeeded by Peter Airey
