= Balmoral Cemetery, Brisbane =

Cemetery in Queensland, Australia

Coordinates: 27.47077°S 153.06474°E

Balmoral Cemetery is a major cemetery in Morningside, Brisbane, Queensland, Australia. The cemetery has also been known as Bulimba Cemetery, Morningside Cemetery and Kangaroo Point Cemetery.

== Establishment ==
Balmoral Park was originally surveyed in 1864. In 1869, 55 acres were gazetted for the Kangaroo Point cemetery. The cemetery is on the corner of Wynnum and Bennetts Roads in the suburb of Morningside. The cemetery was opened in 1874 with the first burial in that same year. In 1891 the cemetery reserve was reduced to approximately 15 acres to allow more recreational space in Balmoral Park.

== Present day ==
The cemetery is listed on the Brisbane City Council Heritage Register.

The Friends of Balmoral Cemetery have volunteered their time to complete a World War I Project to document 56 soldiers who were killed in action and are memorialised in this cemetery.

== Notable people buried in Balmoral Cemetery ==
See Category:Burials at Balmoral Cemetery, Brisbane
