= City of South Brisbane =

Former local government area in Queensland, Australia

Coordinates: 27.483°S 153.025°E

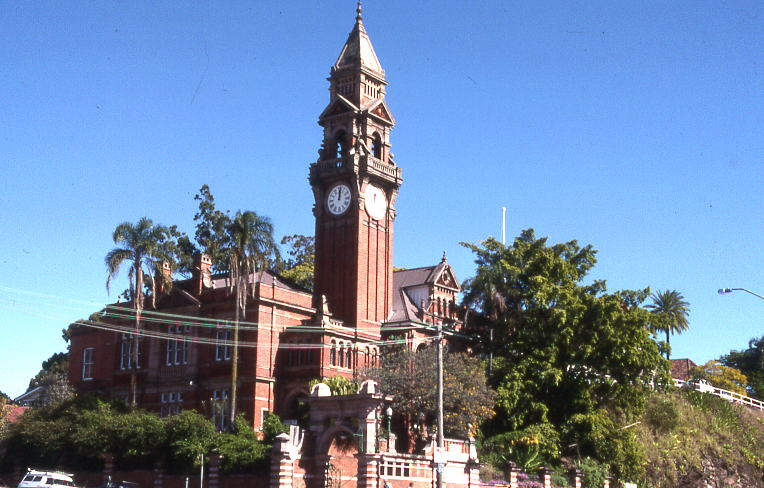
The former South Brisbane Municipal Chambers

The City of South Brisbane was a local government area on the southern side of the Brisbane River, Queensland, Australia. It was established in 1888 and existed until 1925 when it was amalgamated into the City of Brisbane.

== History ==
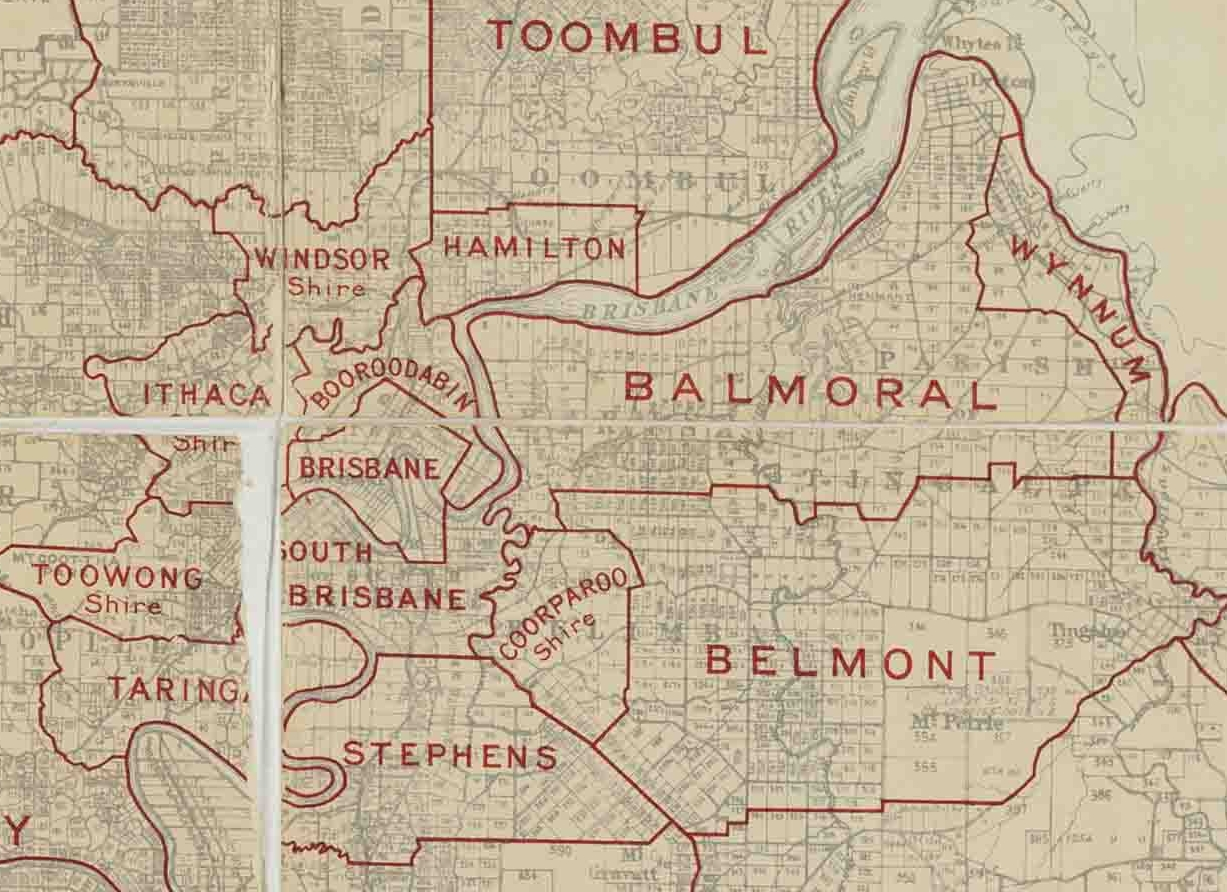
Map of Borough of South Brisbane and adjacent local government areas, March 1902

When the Town of Brisbane was first established, it was predominantly on the northern bank of the Brisbane River, but included some areas south of the river, including the ward of Kangaroo Point and the ward of South Brisbane, the area between Vulture Street and the river.

The Queensland Government passed the Divisional Boards Act of 1879 to establish a system of Divisional Boards for the purpose of providing local government for portions of the colony outside the boundaries of municipalities. The first Divisional Boards were proclaimed on 11 November 1879. Although the Woolloongabba Division was intended to be one of the first established, some delays occurred and it was not established until 9 January 1880.

The role of a Divisional Board was to provide such public services as:

- transport, including roads and bridges
- public health, including water, sanitation and drainage
- public amenities, including parks and cemeteries, etc.

Divisional boards were intended to administer areas with lower and more sparse population than that of a municipality. However, population of the Woolloongabba Divisional Board grew rapidly as the result of the introduction of a railway line into South Brisbane. On 7 January 1888, the Borough of South Brisbane was proclaimed a separate Municipal Institution. It combined the areas formerly part of the Division of Woolloongabba and the South Ward of the Municipality of Brisbane. However, the ward of Kangaroo Point remained part of the Town of Brisbane.

In 1891, work commenced on the construction of the South Brisbane Town Hall. The building was officially opened on 1 July 1892. Although it was commonly known as the "Town Hall", it was officially called the South Brisbane Municipal Chambers. The town hall is now listed on the Queensland Heritage Register.

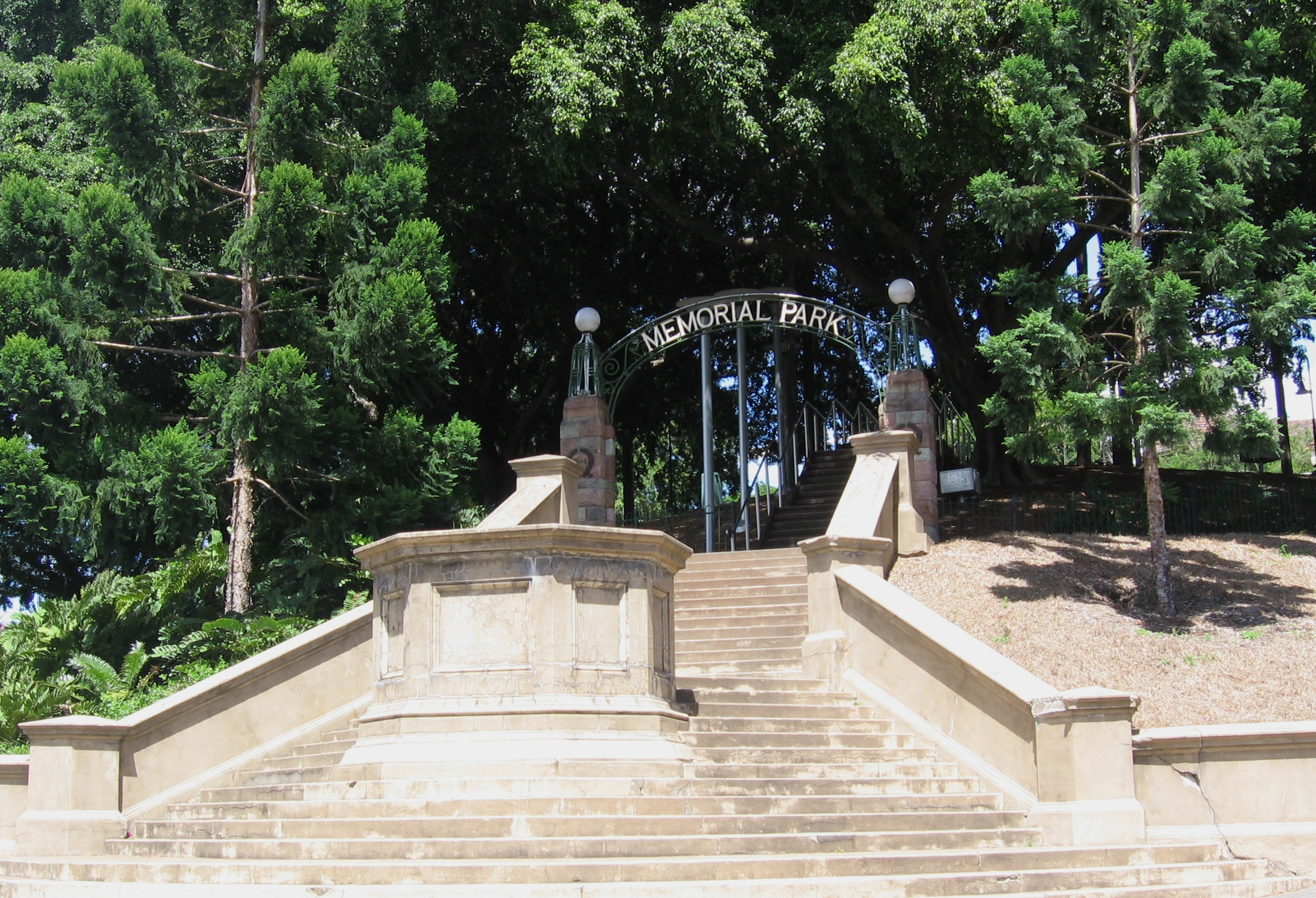
South Brisbane Memorial Park, 2010

The South Brisbane Memorial Park commemorates those of South Brisbane who died in World War I. On 20 May 1921 the South Brisbane City Council set aside a triangular block land bounded by Stanley Street, Vulture Street and Sidon Street opposite the South Brisbane Town Hall. On 6 August 1923 the park was dedicated Governor-General of Australia, Henry Forster.

== Mayors ==
The voters elected aldermen to represent them. The aldermen elected one of their number each year to be mayor; this election took place in February each year.

Year	Name of Mayor	Notes and references
1888	William Stephens	
1889	William Stephens	
1890	Arthur Morry	
1891	Thomas Heaslop	
1892	Thomas Heaslop	
1893	Thomas Heaslop	
1894	William Jones	
1895	William Jones	William Jones resigned as alderman and mayor in September 1895 but was unanimously re-elected a fortnight later.
1896	Abraham Fleetwood Luya	
1897	Abraham Fleetwood Luya	
1898	Abraham Fleetwood Luya	
1899	Philip Nott	
1900	John Garsden	
1901	William Stephens	
1902	John Currie	
1903	George Blocksidge	
1904	William Jones	
1905	John Davies	
1906	Robert Edward Burton	
1907	Andrew Gillespie	
1908	David Ballantyne McCullough	
1909	George Henry Schofield	
1910	George Alfred Savage	
1911	Andrew Gillespie	
1912	John Edward Burke	
1913	Henry Neylan	
1914	Joseph Allen	
1915	James Davey	
1916	John Edwin Hilton	
1917	Robert William Henry Long	
1918	Peter Forrest	
1919	John Gaffney	
1920	Alfred Faulkner	
1921	Alfred Faulkner	
1922	Alfred Faulkner	
1923	Alfred Faulkner	
1924	John Keogh	
1925	John Keogh	

== Significant places ==
- South Brisbane Town Hall
- South Brisbane Library
