= List of heritage sites in West End, Brisbane =

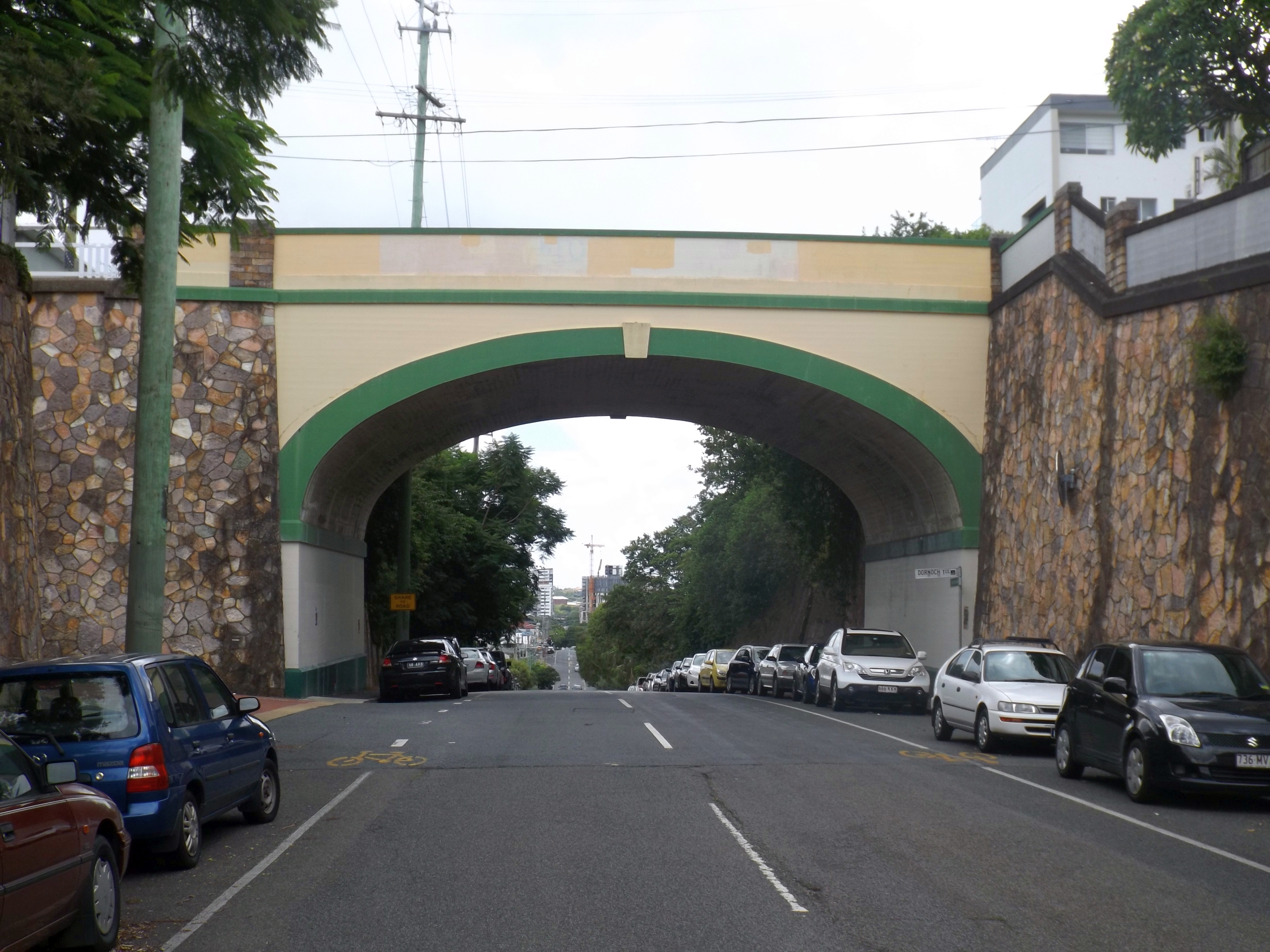
Dornoch Terrace Bridge

A list of the heritage-listed sites in West End, City of Brisbane, Queensland, Australia.

- 19 Bank Street: Astrea
- 96 Boundary Street: West End Police Station
- 111 Boundary Street: Peters Factory
- 137 Boundary Street: Boundary Hotel
- 141 Boundary Street: Westella
- 142 Boundary Street: Shop
- 173 Boundary Street: Pearsons Buildings
- 178 Boundary Road: Kurilpa Library
- 197 Boundary Street: Row of shops
- 219 Boundary Street: Timber cottage
- 223 Boundary Street: Glen Finn Villa
- 225 Boundary Street: Greek Evangelical Church
- 227 Boundary Street: Timber-and-tin residence
- 235 Boundary Street: Gorman Brothers Grocery Store
- 253 Boundary Street: Bungalow style residence
- Dornoch Terrace: Dornoch Terrace Bridge
- 19 Dornoch Terrace: former Methodist Church
- 22 Dornoch Terrace: Flamingo House
- 47 Dornoch Terrace: St Francis School & Church
- 51 Dornoch Terrace: St Francis Convent
- 59 Dornoch Terrace: St Francis Presbytery
- 12 Exeter Street: Two-storey brick terrace house
- 9 Gray Road: House "Hillside"
- 15 Gray Road: Wanda Walha
- 37 Gray Road: Nassagaweya
- 31 Hardgrave Road: Drayton Court
- 61 Hardgrave Road: Rialto Theatre
- 68 Hill end Terrace: Orleigh Park
- 22 Jane Street: Walmar
- 18 Mitchell Street: Hill End Child Care Centre (former church)
- 222 Montague Road: former Stronach's Workshop
- 277 Montague Road: Davies Park
- 277 Montague Road: Gas Stripping Tower
- 317 Montague Road: West End Gasworks Distribution Centre
- 321 Montague Road: West End Gasworks
- 406 Montague Road: Thomas Dixon Centre
- 439 Montague Road: former Dixon's Tannery
- 12 Princhester Street: Islamic Centre of West End
- 14 Sussex Street: Carnoch
- 16 Sussex Street: Norwich
- 30 Sussex Street: Brighton Terrace
- 24 Vulture Street: West End State School
- 61 Vulture Street: Shop and Residence
- 79 Vulture Street: former Marshalls Butchers
- 113 Vulture Street: West End Uniting Church & Hall
