= Dornoch Terrace Bridge =

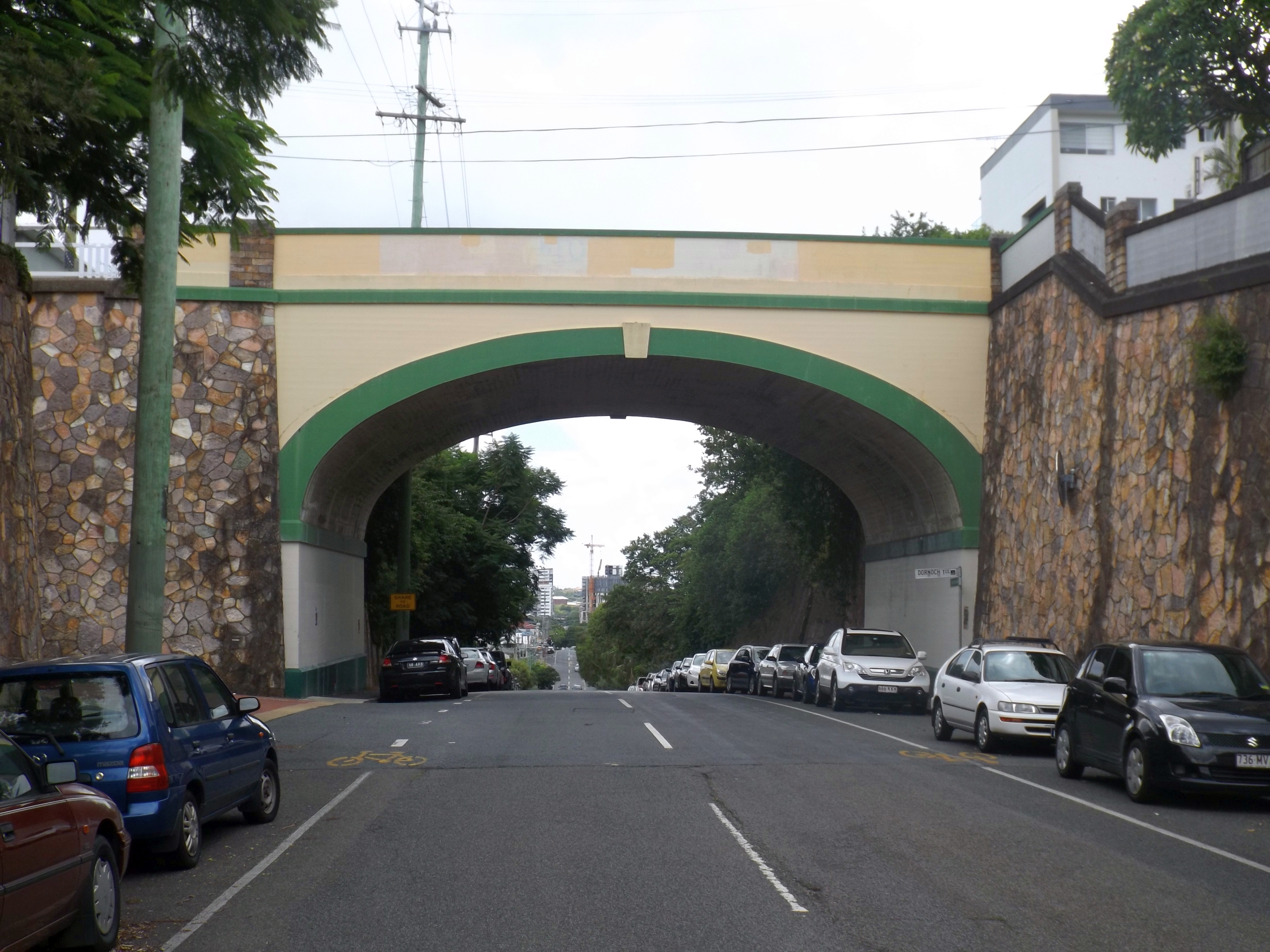
- View from the south along Boundary Street, 2015

- Location within Queensland Location within Australia
- 27.4867°S 153.0106°E
- Location: Dornoch Terrace, West End, Queensland, Australia

Queensland Heritage Register
- Official name: Dornoch Terrace Bridge
- Type: state heritage (built)
- Designated: 1 October 2007
- Reference no.: 602460
- Significant period: 1940s

Dornoch Terrace Bridge is a heritage-listed road bridge at Dornoch Terrace, West End, Queensland, Australia. It was added to the Queensland Heritage Register on 1 October 2007.

== History ==
The Dornoch Terrace Bridge was built in 1941 by the Brisbane City Council. It provides a vehicular and pedestrian thoroughfare down Dornoch Terrace towards the Brisbane River. Built as an overpass across Boundary Street, the bridge allows access to the road below by a series of staircases and a slip road.

The Bridge is a prominent landmark in the West End and Highgate Hill area and reflects the period when Boundary Street was regraded as part of an ambitious scheme to connect West End to the new University of Queensland campus at St Lucia. The excavations are supported by concrete retaining walls, faced in fine stonework, creating dramatic approaches to the bridge and incorporating connecting staircases and a slip road between the two streets. The Dornoch Terrace Bridge and associated retaining walls survive as the only visible evidence of this ambitious scheme.

Highgate Hill was first settled by Europeans in 1856. The first European settler in this area was Mr. Trimble, an officer at the Customs House. He was followed by many new settlers, including the Wilson family, famed for naming the area "Highgate Hill". Prior to European settlement of this area there was a track along the present Dornoch Terrace through to the present Gladstone Road and through to Annerley. In the mid 1800s Dornoch Terrace was known as "The Broad Road", and ran atop the area we now know as Highgate Hill.

Initially a farming area, by 1889, the area around Dornoch Terrace became increasingly built up and populated. A reservoir was built on the corner of Dornoch Terrace and Gladstone Road to service the growing population. Not long after this much of the land surrounding Dornoch Terrace was subdivided into various estates.

The increase in urban population in the Highgate Hill area can be partly attributed to the rapid growth of industry in the West End area, especially along the river. Initially the main industry in this area was timber. Once the area had been cleared of timber, factories were subsequently constructed in the late 1800s and early 1900s, many along the river and on Montague Road (well below the high hill of Dornoch Terrace). A variety of industries were established and included a gas works (West End Gasworks and Gas Stripping Tower), a concrete pipes works, a soft drink factory, a boot factory, glass works and an ice-cream plant.

The introduction of a public transport system to service the Highgate Hill area began with the Soden omnibus service in 1878. This ran from the city centre, across the river and up to Dornoch Terrace, from there it would travel to Ipswich Road. Electric trams were introduced to Brisbane in the early 1900s, and by 1908 Highgate Hill could be reached by this service. The electric trams travelled all the way up Hardgrave Road and down to the Hill End ferry. There was also a tram service that travelled up Boundary Street, this however, ceased well below the summit of Dornoch Terrace. The bridge was never used for trams. Tram services ceased in 1969.

Several large houses were built along Dornoch Terrace at this time, including "Torbreck" (now the apartment building Torbreck) and Kinauld, designed by architect Alexander Brown Wilson and built in 1888. The building of these prestigious houses signifies the growth and increased wealth of the Highgate Hill area, in particularly along Dornoch Terrace.

There were two prior bridges known to span Boundary Street. A map of 1895 reveals that an "over bridge" was in existence and in December 1888, the South Brisbane Municipal Council approved a tender by the firm of Walters and Cooper to construct a bridge at this intersection. This late 1880s bridge existed until the current bridge replaced it in 1941. This earlier bridge was known to locals as the "Black Bridge" due to wet tar falling from wagons carrying felled timber. The ends of the timber were washed with tar, and on the journey across the bridge the tar would drip onto the road and subsequently be splashed onto the bridge railings.

In 1909 the University of Queensland was formed, and was initially accommodated in Old Government House at Gardens Point. However, in 1926, Dr James O'Neil Mayne and Miss Mary Emelia Mayne donated £50,000 to the Brisbane City Council to resume land at St Lucia and this was to become the new site of the University.

Due to the Great Depression there was no prospect of building the new university until 1935 when the Queensland Premier, William Forgan Smith, announced that the Queensland Government would undertake construction at St Lucia. Part of this construction was the proposal to build a bridge over the Brisbane River from West End to St. Lucia.

Building a bridge over the Brisbane River involved developing a suitable approach from the city to the proposed bridge included the resumption of land and excavation along Boundary Street. Drawings for a new bridge carrying Dornoch Terrace over Boundary Street, and associated retaining walls, were prepared between 1939 and 1941 and the works were carried out by the Brisbane City Council. The University of Queensland development was suspended during the Second World War, the St. Lucia Bridge project was subsequently postponed. When work resumed after the War, the University building program was revised and downsized due to inflated building costs. The bridge connecting West End to St. Lucia never eventuated; however, in 1941 the Dornoch Terrace Bridge was built.

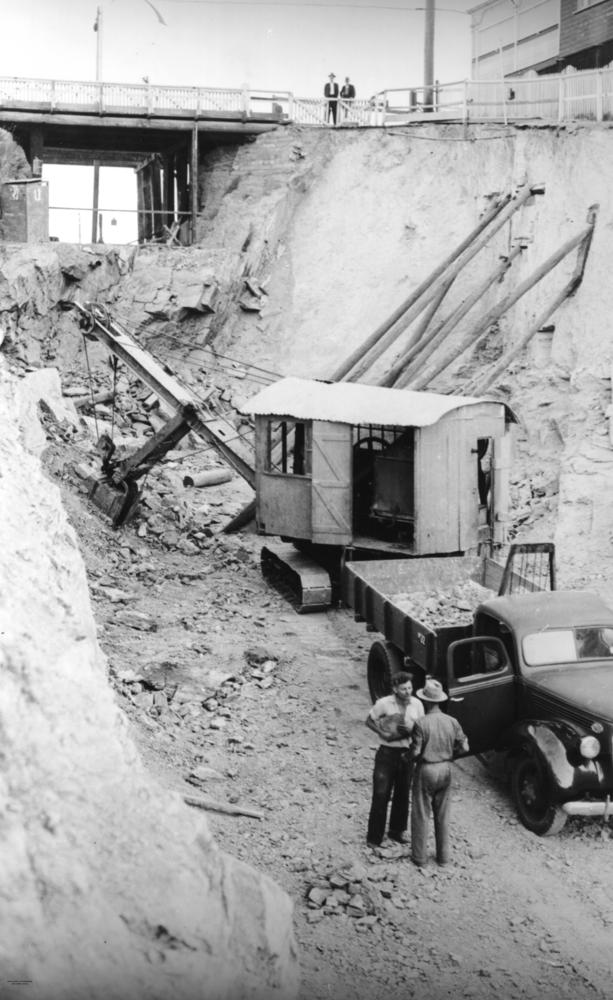
Excavation of the approach to the proposed West End to St. Lucia bridge, Brisbane, 1940

The building of the Dornoch Terrace Bridge was achieved with no major hurdles. The bridge was designed to sit somewhat lower in elevation to the original "Black Bridge". This was due to the side accesses running down the bridge onto Boundary Street below. It was also to attain a comfortable slope down Dornoch Terrace towards Hill End. During the construction of the bridge the embankments were dug away, what was removed was then reused in the Victoria Park embankment on Bowen Bridge Road.

Today the Dornoch Terrace Bridge receives a great deal of vehicular and pedestrian traffic, both over and under. It provides an easy pedestrian thoroughfare to the West End shops on Boundary Street, vehicular and pedestrian access to the restaurants at Hill End, and ease of access to the houses and apartments for Highgate Hill residents.

== Description ==
The Dornoch Terrace Bridge in Highgate Hill is a distinctive landmark, which is highly visible from both northern and southern approaches along Boundary Street. The northern view along Boundary Street undulates through corrugated iron roofed cottages and past local landmarks such as the Kurilpa Library clock tower. Looking south, the scene takes in the St Lucia Reach of the Brisbane River and the suburbs beyond. Its arch spans the excavated Boundary Street, and Dornoch Terrace passes over it. The excavations are supported by concrete retaining walls, faced in fine stonework. Pedestrian access is via incorporated concrete staircases and ramps, and vehicular traffic access between the two streets is provided by a slip road.

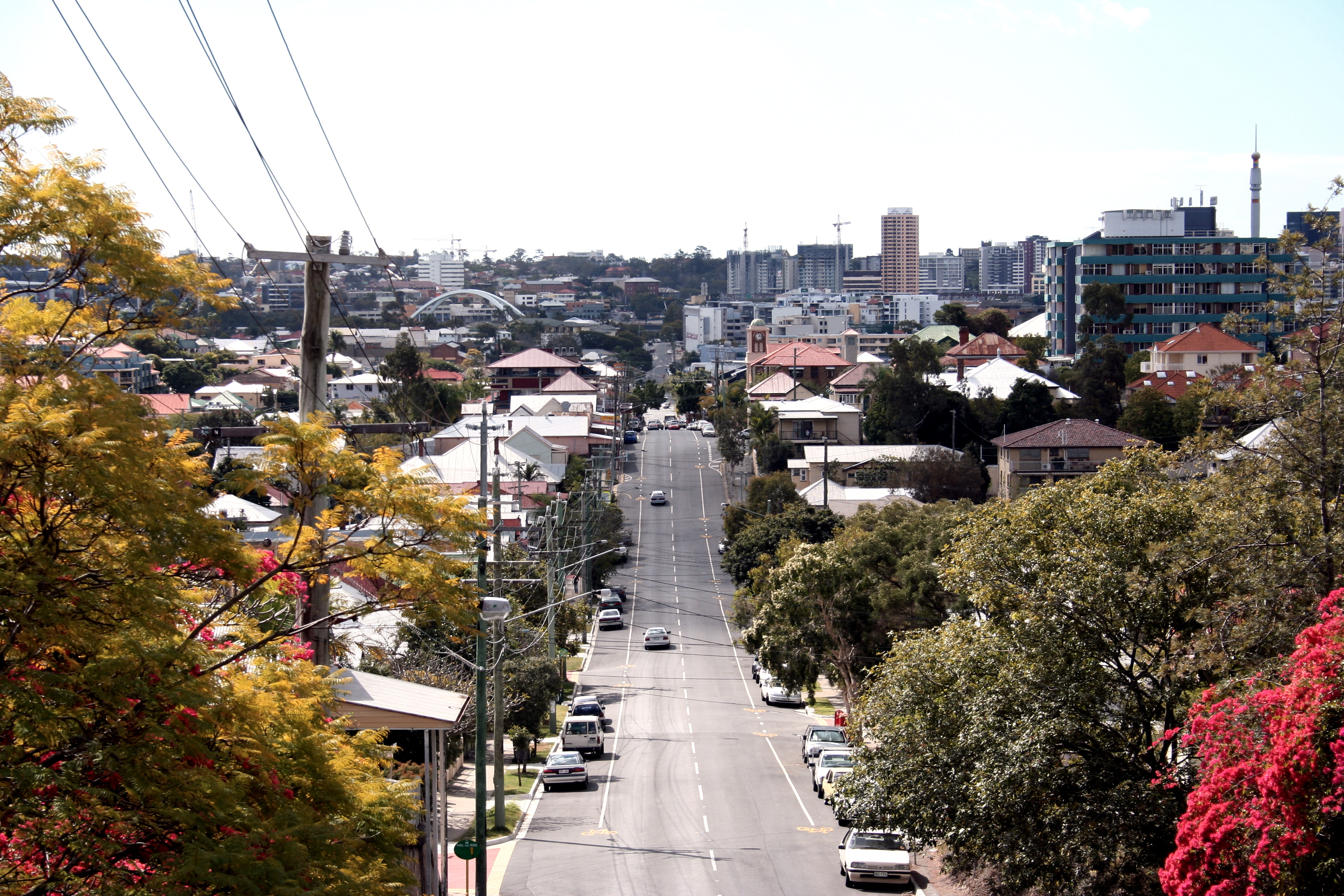
View down Boundary Street

Located at the highest point in Boundary Street, the bridge's arch terminates powerful axial views along West End's main thoroughfare. Looking south and upwards from the West End shopping area, the eye is led past the Kurilpa Library clocktower towards the bridge. From the south, the arch is also a prominent part of the streetscape.

The Dornoch Terrace roadway is supported by a painted concrete vault, generated by a basket-handle arch and sprung from concrete abutments on either side of Boundary Street. The abutments stand proud of the surrounding stone retaining walls and feature a plinth and impost painted in a contrasting green. The off-form striated finish of the vault's soffit is evident beneath the paintwork, whereas other parts of the bridge appear to be rendered and painted. The arch features an architrave painted in a contrasting green and crowned with a keystone. Above the spandrels, the bridge's solid concrete balustrade features a rendered stringcourse at pavement level and a simple concrete capping. The balustrades are terminated at each end by a pair of Brisbane Tuff piers, except at the eastern end of the southern balustrade which ends in a single stone pier. The balustrade and abutment walls of the bridge are frequent targets for graffiti attacks and bear evidence of many attempts to paint over them.

=== Retaining walls and bridge approaches ===
To facilitate pedestrian and vehicular movement between the two streets, a slip road and a series of staircases and ramps were integrated into the treatment of approaches to the bridge. Fine Brisbane Tuff walls taper out from the bridge, supporting surrounding houses.

The stonework to the retaining walls is generally Brisbane Tuff rubblework. The stones are hammer finished to effect a flat surface and carefully shaped and positioned, eliminating the use of infill pieces and effecting the random distribution of Brisbane Tuff colours. The pointing is generally proud of the stone face and shaped into smooth curves.

=== Western approach – Dornoch Terrace ===
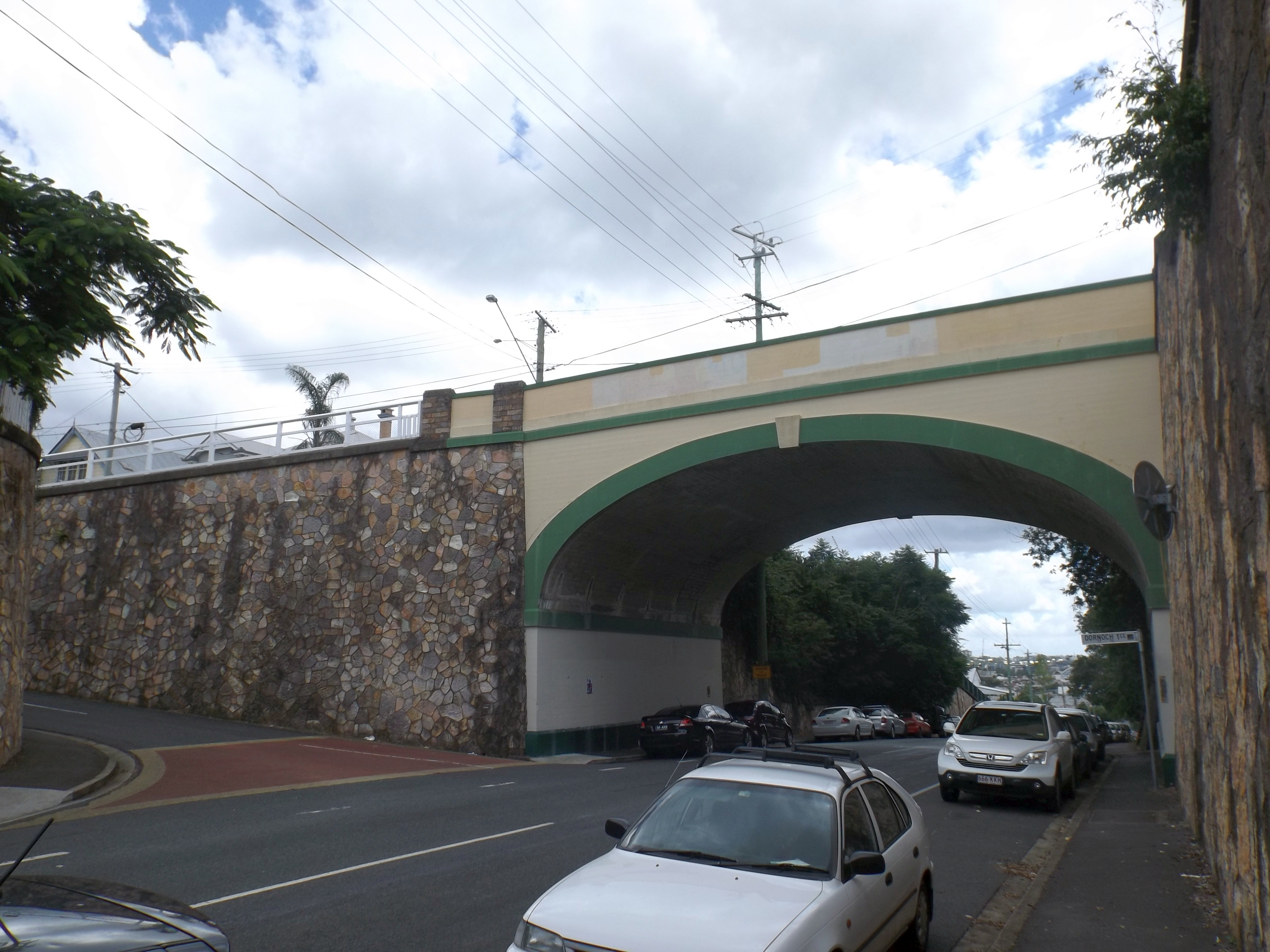
Lower western approach, 2015

The main feature of this approach is the narrow two-way slip road along the southern side. This is the only vehicular connection between Dornoch Terrace and Boundary Street

Near-vertical retaining walls rise from each side of the slip road. The wall rising to Dornoch Terrace is surmounted by concrete capping and a simple painted post and rail fence. The wall on the southern side incorporates openings to stairways to the properties above. A small section of this wall curves around into Boundary Street.

=== Southern approach – Boundary Street – eastern side ===
The retaining wall stepping down from the southern side of the bridge supports flights of stairs alternating with gentle ramps. The stonework is finished to the profile of the stairs and ramps and capped with concrete. The capping, in turn, supports a balustrade of solid concrete panels spanning between stonework piers. Like the piers on the bridge itself, these consist of Brisbane Tuff ashlaring with a bevelled capping piece.

The retaining wall between the stair and the adjoining property to the east comprises sections of brickwork and Brisbane Tuff ashlaring.

=== Northern approach – Boundary Street – eastern side ===
This embankment extends from the bridge down to outside 222 Boundary Street. It combines exposed rock faces, vegetation, dry masonry closest to the bridge, and sections of fine stonework similar to that used on other embankments. Part of this stonework appears to have fallen away from the concrete retaining wall behind.

=== Northern approach – Boundary Street – western side ===
This embankment supports a pedestrian walkway from the bridge to the corner of Bristol Street. In an unusual arrangement, the stair at the bottom of this walkway passes below the awning of what appears to be a former corner shop. The path, supported on a stonework retaining wall, then ramps up to a dog-leg. Here the retaining wall rakes down to form a low wall in front of a vegetated rock face, before raking up again to meet the bridge. The dog-leg in the path takes it behind this overgrown embankment and connects it with the footpath on Dornoch Terrace. A simple painted timber handrail follows the top of the retaining wall.

== Heritage listing ==
Dornoch Terrace Bridge was listed on the Queensland Heritage Register on 1 October 2007 having satisfied the following criteria.

The place is important in demonstrating the evolution or pattern of Queensland's history.

The Dornoch Terrace Bridge is part of a substantial road expansion / infrastructure project undertaken by the Brisbane City Council and is evidence of the 1930s proposal to connect West End and the University of Queensland at St Lucia. It is important as an indication of a phase in Queensland's history when the value of education, and providing suitable academic institutions, was beginning to be recognised.

The place is important in demonstrating the principal characteristics of a particular class of cultural places.

Consisting of substantial stone retaining walls, supporting pedestrian and vehicular paths and associated residential development, Dornoch Terrace Bridge is important in demonstrating the principal characteristics of a particular class of cultural places as it displays uncommonness in bridge design in Queensland as well as being an important community facility in the past and the present.

The place is important because of its aesthetic significance.

As a prominent landmark in the district, the scale, texture and colour of the walls have considerable visual impact on Boundary Street, Dornoch Terrace and the surrounding streets. The bridge provides attractive views from Dornoch Terrace and is itself an important scenic element.
