= Green Flea Markets (West End) =

Weekly market in West End, Brisbane

Coordinates: 27.478701°S 153.004559°E

The Green Flea Markets are held every Saturday morning in Davies Park, West End, Queensland (Australia).

The Market site is home to a number of giant fig trees which have recently become infected with a fungal disease (Phellinus noxius) that is spreading all over Queensland. The treatment of the trees is threatening the existence of this unique market.

The Green Flea Markets have been run for over six years by creator Peter Hackworth, whose licence expired in early 2009. The Brisbane City Council has since awarded the markets to Sydney-based events management company Blue Sky, who are also responsible for the South Bank markets in Brisbane as well as the Manly and Opera House markets in Sydney. Concerns have been raised by market goers and local community groups that the markets could lose their distinctive West End feel.
