= Magnus Jensen (Queensland politician) =

The Honourable Magnus Jensen

Member of the Queensland Legislative Council
- In office 4 May 1904 – 16 May 1915

Personal details
- Born: Magnus Jensen; 1857 Braidwood, Colony of New South Wales
- Died: 16 May 1915 (aged 57 or 58) Morningside, Queensland, Australia
- Resting place: Bulimba Cemetery
- Spouse: Kate Marian Honck (m.1884)
- Occupation: Lawyer

Magnus Jensen (1857–1915) was a lawyer and politician in Queensland, Australia. He was a Member of the Queensland Legislative Council.

== Politics ==
Magnus Jensen was appointed to the Queensland Legislative Council from 4 May 1904. A lifetime appointment, he remained on the council until his death on 16 May 1915.

== Later life ==
Magnus Jensen died suddenly overnight at his home Lynfield off Lytton Road at Morningside on Sunday 16 May 1915. He was buried in the Bulimba Cemetery on Monday 17 May 1915.

== See also ==
- Members of the Queensland Legislative Council, 1900–1909; 1910–16
- Astrea, one of his former homes (now heritage listed)
