= West End, Queensland =

West End
- Suburb
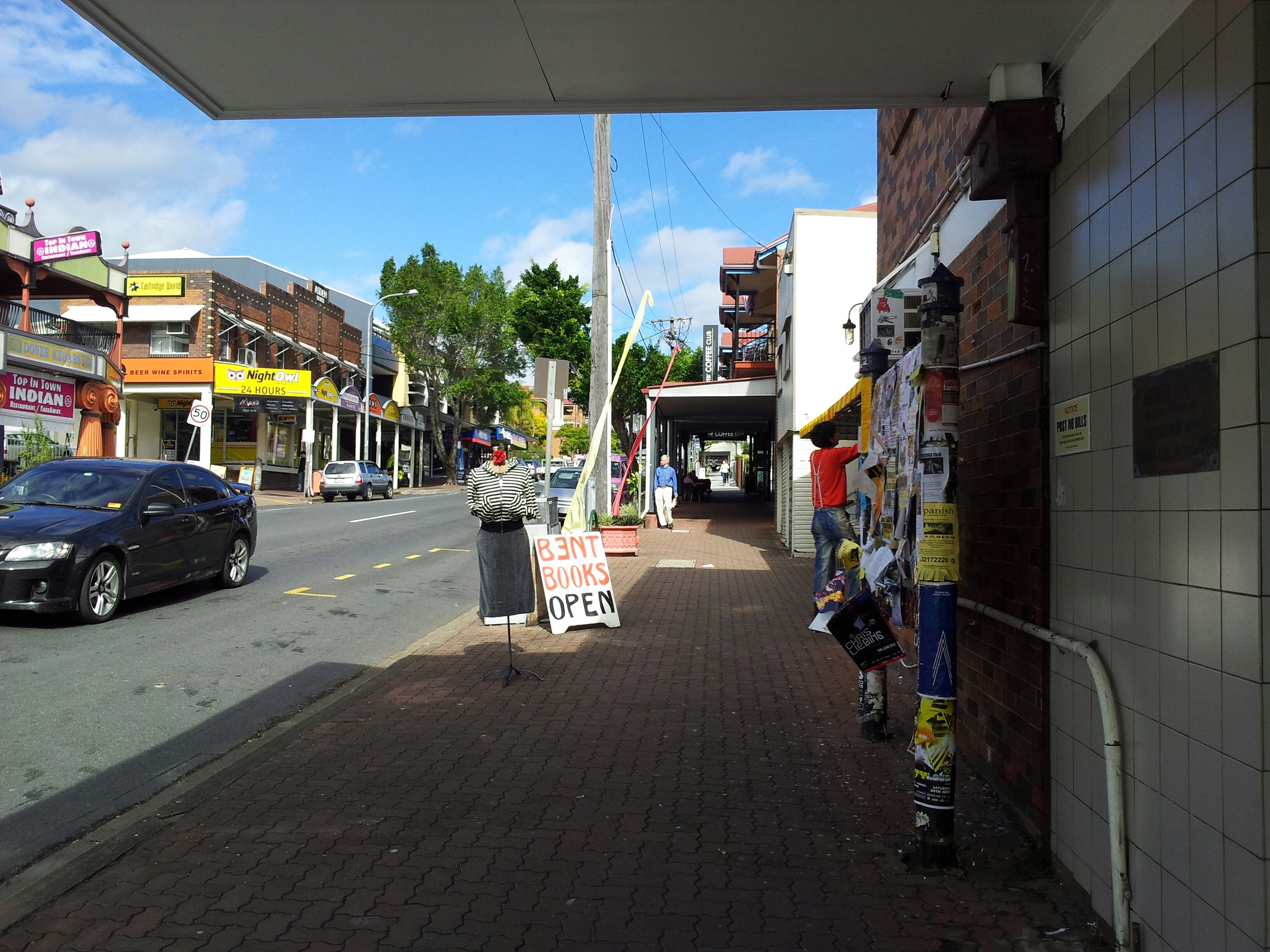
- View down Boundary Street Shops

- Interactive map of West End
- Coordinates: 27.4830°S 153.0066°E
- Country: Australia
- State: Queensland
- City: Brisbane
- LGA: City of Brisbane (The Gabba Ward)
- Location: 2.9 km (1.8 mi) SW of Brisbane CBD
- Established: 1860s

Government
  - State electorate: South Brisbane
  - Federal division: Griffith

Area
  - Total: 2.3 km^{2} (0.89 sq mi)

Population
  - Total: 14,730 (2021 census)
  - Density: 6,400/km^{2} (16,600/sq mi)
- Time zone: UTC+10:00 (AEST)
- Postcode: 4101
Suburbs around West End
Auchenflower	Milton	South Brisbane
Toowong	West End	Highgate Hill
St Lucia	St Lucia	Highgate Hill

West End is an inner southern suburb in the City of Brisbane, Queensland, Australia. In the 2021 census, West End had a population of 14,730 people.

The Aboriginal name for the area is Kurilpa, which means place of the water rat.

== Geography ==
Geographically, West End is bounded by the median of the Brisbane River to the west and the south.

Hill End is a neighbourhood (27.4833°S 153.0000°E) within West End in the south-west of the suburb near the Brisbane River. West End is adjacent to the suburbs of South Brisbane and Highgate Hill. These three suburbs make up a peninsula of the Brisbane River.

== History ==
Before the arrival of Europeans in West End, there was an important habitual Aboriginal camp in the area around the upper part of Musgrave Park where Brisbane State High School now stands. Boundary Street in West End and in Spring Hill were named as along with Vulture Street and Wellington Road, they formed the original boundary of the Town of Brisbane. Later, when Brisbane grew out to these boundaries, police prevented the Jagera and Turrbal peoples from being within the boundaries of the British settlement at night and on Sundays. It has been questioned whether the actions of the police were legally sanctioned or not.

The entire riverbank in the West End area was covered with impenetrable rain forest. This was described as a "tangled mass of trees, vines, flowering creepers, staghorns, elkhorns, towering scrub palms, giant ferns, and hundreds of other varieties of the fern family, beautiful and rare orchids, and the wild passion flower". Along the river bank itself were sandy beaches, water lilies in thousands and dangling convolvulus.

Bush rats or fawn-footed melomys existed in large numbers in the rain forest and were hunted by driving them into nets. They were roasted and eaten by women only. They featured in various dreaming tales and tribal lore. The Aboriginal place name of Kurilpa derives from the name Kureel-pa meaning place of water rats. The name is still used for various local places, buildings and institutions in West End and South Brisbane area, e.g. West End was located in the former Electoral District of Kurilpa.

West End was named by early British settlers after the West End of London. European settlers took advantage of the fertile soil to establish farms and orchards. There were strawberry farms where for an entry fee, visitors could eat all they wanted. A creek ran down from the Dornoch Terrace area into a reservoir at the corner of Melbourne and Manning streets from where water was sold. After heavy rain, this creek caused local flooding in West End. There was a spring near the site of the Boundary Hotel which was used by residents from the south side of Brisbane to collect water with long queues forming in dry periods.

A Primitive Methodist Church opened in Hill End in October 1873. On 16 August 1875, three schools opened: West End Boys State School, West End Girls State School and West End Infants State School, with a total of 236 pupils. On 30 June 1936, the boys' and girls' schools were merged creating West End State School. The infants' school was merged into West End State School on 16 December 1994. The school was built on a 5-acre (2.0 ha) site originally set aside to be a cemetery. However, no burials were conducted there as the much larger South Brisbane Cemetery was established in Dutton Park in 1868.

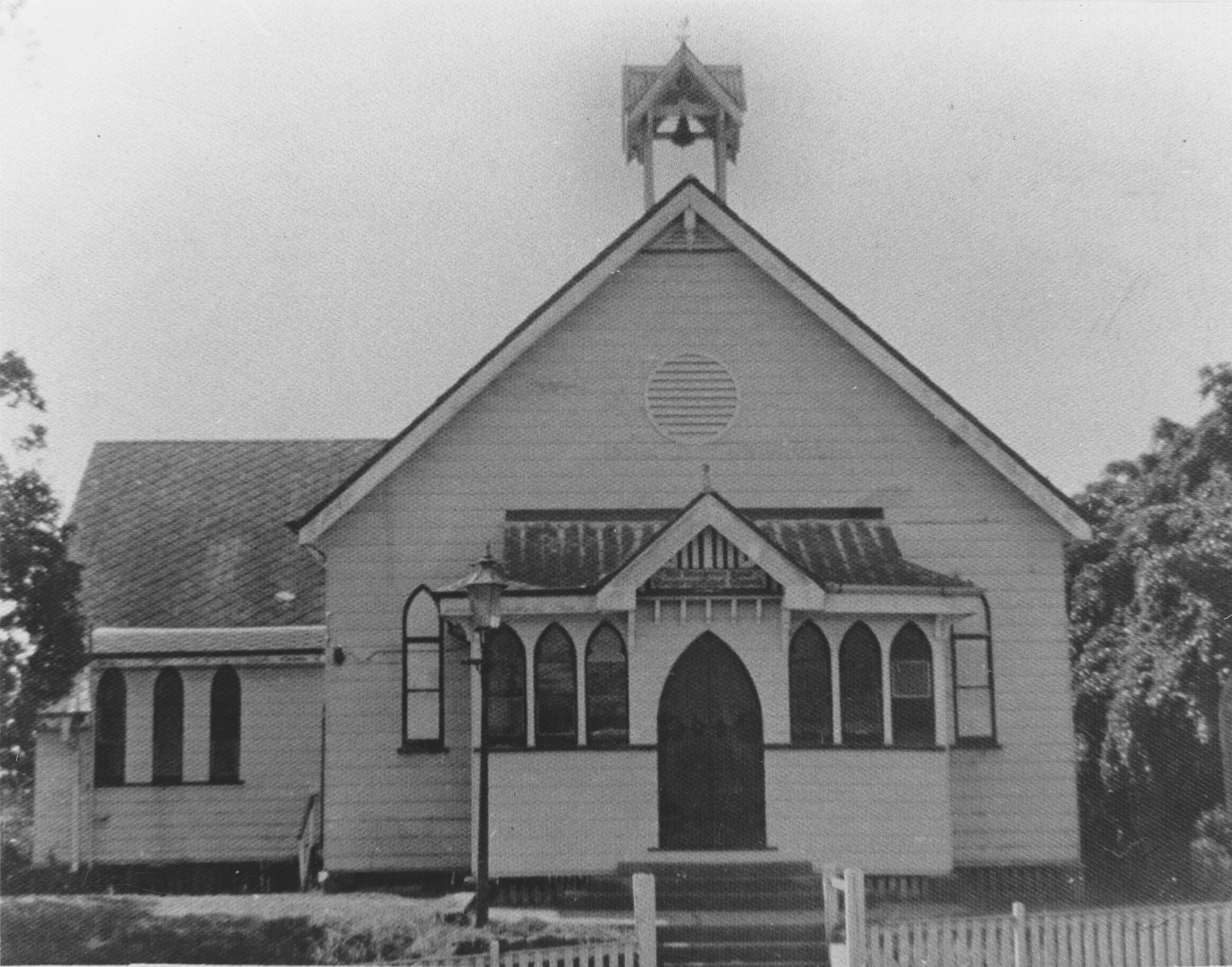
Brighton Road Congregational Church

In February 1879, the Brighton Road Congregational Church was completed. It was designed by architect John R. Hall and built by Mr E. Lewis from hardwood and chamferboard. It was 50 by 30 feet (15.2 by 9.1 m) with a Gothic roof made of shingles. It had a 10-by-10-foot (3.0 by 3.0 m) vestry, an ornamental porch and bell turret. The church closed on 21 May 1972. It was on the north-west corner of Brighton Road and Sussex Street (27.483176°S 153.012°E). The church building is no longer extant. Tangara retirement village operated by Blue Care opened on the site in October 1980.

In the 1880s, there was industrial development along Montague Road, including the South Brisbane Gas Works, sawmills and a steam joinery. The farms and orchards were steadily subdivided into suburban allotments which were popular due to the proximity of West End to the city, the river breezes and improving public transport.

West End Wesleyan Methodist Church opened in Vulture Street in 1884. It was designed by Alexander Brown Wilson. It was built from brick at a cost of £2850 and could seat 550 people. Following the amalgamation that created the Uniting Church of Australia in 1977, it became West End Uniting Church. It is listed on the Brisbane Heritage Register.

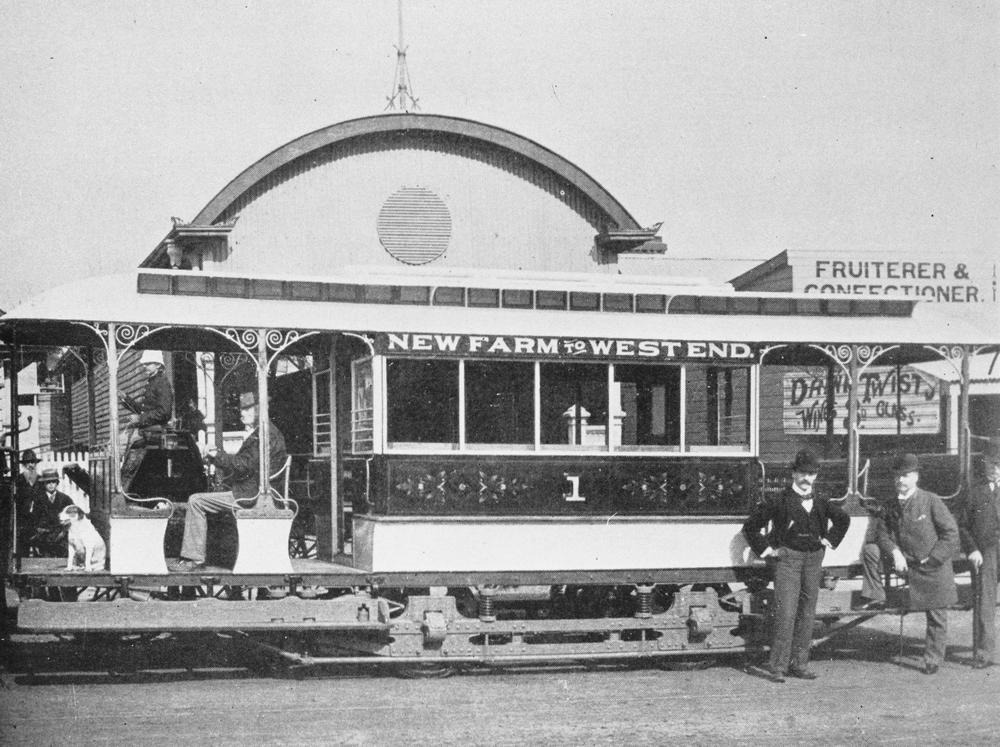
West End to New Farm tram, ca 1900

West End was one of the first suburbs of Brisbane to be serviced by a tram line, being opened in 1885. Initially the tram was horse-drawn and terminated in Boundary Street, but in 1897 the line was electrified and extended to the corner of Hardgrave Road and Hoogley Street, via Vulture Street. It was subsequently extended down Hoogley Street to the ferry terminus at the end of Hoogley Street in 1925. The tram line closed on 13 April 1969.

St Peter's Anglican Church was dedicated on 11 September 1888 by Archdeacon Nathaniel Dawes. The church was 58 by 31 feet (17.7 by 9.4 m) and made of Oregon pine with a shingle roof. It was designed by H. W. Martin and could seat 175 people. The church was at 18 Mitchell Street (27.48603°S 153.00526°E). Its closure on 24 April 1995 was approved by Archbishop Peter Hollingworth. As September 2022, the church building was being used as a childcare centre. It is listed on the Brisbane Heritage Register.

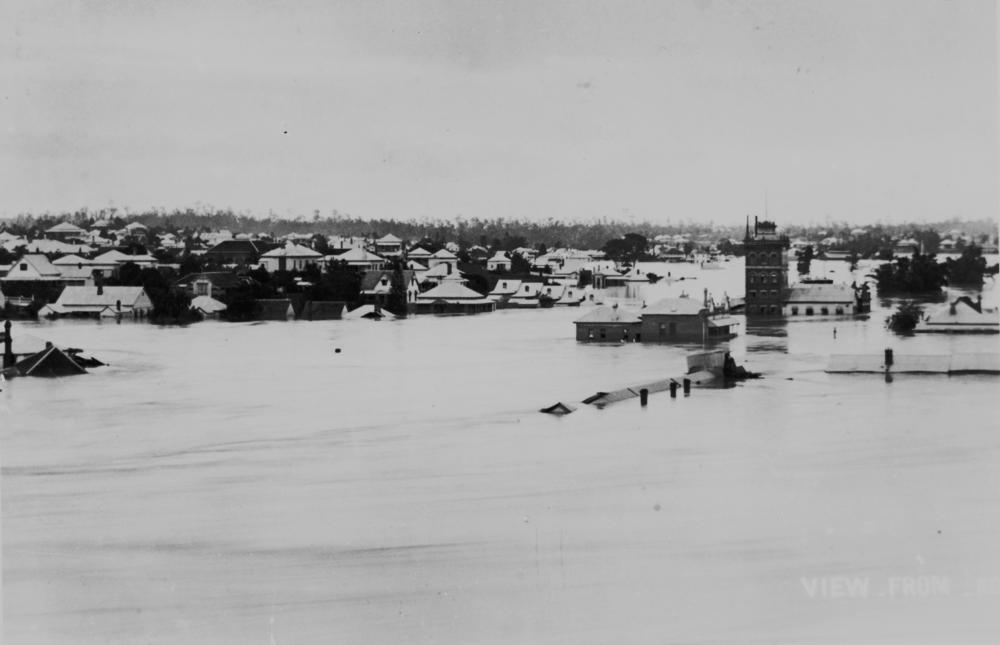
West End during the 1893 Brisbane flood

The riverside area of West End was badly flooded during the 1893 Brisbane flood. The West End Library opened in 1925.

The foundation stone for St Francis of Assisi Catholic Church was laid on 10 June 1923 by the Apostolic Delegate, Monsignor Bartolomeo Cattaneo. On 26 November 1923, it was opened and blessed by Archbishop James Duhig. It was quickly realised that the site would not be large enough to build a school, so, in 1926, an 8-acre (3.2 ha) site immediately across Dornoch Terrace from the church was purchased and the church building relocated to the new site (now 47-59 Dornoch Terrace). On 22 January 1928, St Francis' Catholic Primary School opened adjacent to the church by Archbishop Duhig; the school was operated by the Sisters of Mercy with 113 students on the opening day. In 1928, a convent and a presbytery were also built on the larger site. The school closed in 1974 due to the changing demographics of the area.

The former Tristram's Drink Factory at 79 Boundary Street was built in 1928 and is one of Australia's best examples of the Mission Revival Style architecture. It was converted into a market in the 1990s and remains a heritage landmark of West End.

The Dornoch Terrace Bridge was completed in 1941, replacing an older bridge across Boundary Street built in 1888. The 1941 bridge was a precursor to a new bridge across the Brisbane River to the University of Queensland, which was never built. The 2017 University of Queensland Master Plan is still calling for a bridge from West End. Christian Outreach College opened on 16 May 1978 in Kurilpa Street, West End. It relocated to Mansfield in 1928, but is now within the suburb boundaries of Carindale in 1982. It is now known as Citepointe Christian College. In 1988, the Brisbane School of Distance Education was established at 405 Montague Road. It was the amalgamation of the Primary Correspondence School (opened on 24 January 1922), the Secondary Correspondence School (opened in 1958) and the Preschool Correspondence (opened in 1974). It relocated to Coorparoo in 2011. Scenes for the feature film Jucy (2010) were shot at the now-defunct video store Trash Video in the suburb. The suburb was affected by the 2010–2011 Queensland floods as the Brisbane River broke its banks. From 11 January low-lying areas of the suburb and other places in Brisbane were evacuated.

== Demographics ==
Historical population
Year	Pop.	±%
2001	5,680	—
2006	6,206	+9.3%
2011	8,061	+29.9%
2016	9,474	+17.5%
2021	14,730	+55.5%

In the 2011 census, West End had a population of 8,061 people; 50% male (4,029 males) and 50% female (4,032 females). Just over half (52.4%) of households were family households, 34.6% were single person households and 13.1% were group households. The median age of the West End population was 35 years, 2 years below the Australian median. Children aged under 15 years made up 11.5% of the population and people aged 65 years and over made up 8.8% of the population.

The suburb has traditionally been home to Brisbane's largest Greek Australian community, with an estimated 75% of Brisbane's Greek population living in West End by 1980. The most common ancestries in West End are English 20.6%, Australian 16.8%, Irish 10.1%, Scottish 8.0% and Greek 5.2%. Indigenous Australians make up 1.5% of the population of West End. For this reason, West End has been described as one of Brisbane's most successful multicultural areas. 56.6% of people living in West End were born in Australia, compared to the national average of 69.8%. The other top responses for country of birth were England 4.5%, New Zealand 3.4%, Vietnam 2.7%, Greece 2.7% and India 1.4%. 66.4% of people spoke only English at home; the next most popular languages were Greek 5.9%, Vietnamese 3.3%, Mandarin 2.0%, Cantonese 1.4% and Spanish 1.1%. The most common religious affiliation was "No Religion" (35.3%); the next most common responses were Catholic 16.5%, Anglican 8.1%, Eastern Orthodox 7.4% and Buddhism 5.2%.

In the 2016 census, West End had a population of 9,474 people. In the 2021 census, West End had a population of 14,730 people.

== Heritage listings ==
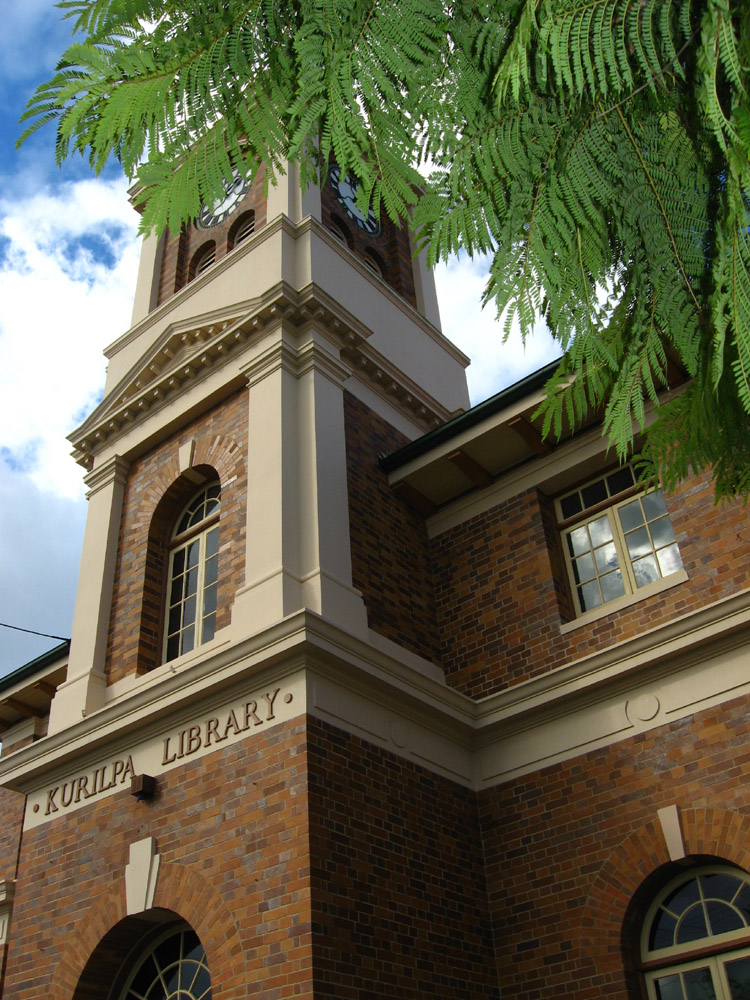
Kurilpa Library in Boundary Street, 2005

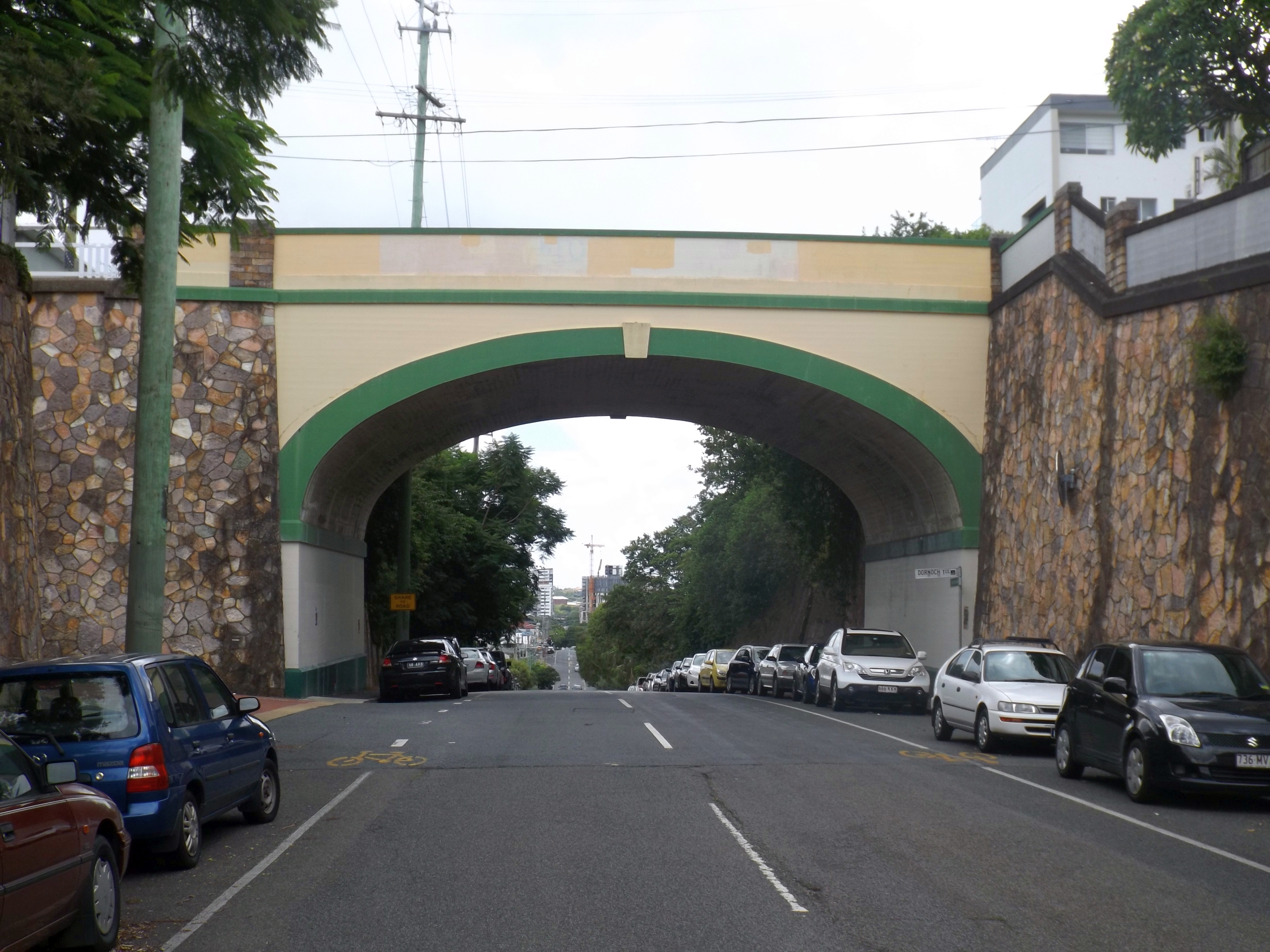
The Dornoch Terrace Bridge over Boundary Street, 2015

West End has a number of heritage-listed sites, including:

- 19 Bank Street: Astrea
- 178 Boundary Road: Kurilpa Library
- Dornoch Terrace: Dornoch Terrace Bridge
- 15 Gray Road: Wanda Walha
- 30 Sussex Street: Brighton Terrace
- 37 Gray Road: Nassagaweya
- 277 Montague Road: Gas Stripping Tower
- 321 Montague Road: West End Gasworks
- 406 Montague Road: Thomas Dixon Centre
- 24 Vulture Street (27.4796°S 153.0081°E): West End State School

== Streets ==
89 streets:

Adelaide St north from Victoria St, 3-15, 4-14

Ambleside St west from Amersham to Horan St, 1-23, 2-22

Amersham St south from Jane St, 5-9, 6A-12

Anthony St west from Montague Rd to Buchanan St, 2-32

Archibald St west from 149 Hardgrave Rd via Crowther St to 4 Brady St, 3-45, 4-46

Army St north from Vulture St (numbered 60 Vulture St)

Ashington St west from Hardgrave Rd to Montague Rd, 5-25, 6-34

Averbury St east from Hoogley to Carlow St

Bailey St south from Kurilpa St to Rogers St, 8-34, 33-59

Bank St north from Jane St to Mollison St, 1A-39, 4-52

Barnsley St west from 327-329 Boundary St, 1-13, 2-16

Beattie St south from Skinner St to Victoria St, 11-23, 4-20

Besant St from O'Connell St to Vulture St, 29-41

Beesley St west from Montague Rd

Bond St south from Vulture St to Brighton St, 11-31, 4-42

Boundary St west side odd numbers 83-311-345, east side even numbers 68-226, south to Brisbane River 230-242

Brady St west from 46 Archibald to Montague Rd, 5-19, 4-16, traffic one-way east

Bristol St east from Hardgrave Rd to Boundary St, 5-69, 2-70

Browning St south side from Boundary St to Russel St, odd numbers 1-7

Buchanan St south from Donkin St to Jane St, 1-38

Cambridge St south from Vulture St to Corbett St, 11-41, 4-40

Carlow St south from Ryan St 6-10

Corbett St west from Boundary St to Exeter St 2-42, 5-29

Cordeaux St east from 462 Montague to 21 Morry St, 2-34, 5-39

Crowther St south from Victoria St to Archibald St, 9-37, 10-28

Daventry St south from Dornoch Terrace via Barnsley St to 24 Glenfield St, 9-53 ,16-54

Donkin St east from Buchanan St to Montague Rd, 1-30

Doris St south from Dornoch Terrace (between 19-25) via Gray Rd to 126 Ryan St, 7-41, 8-36

Dornoch Terrace (part) east from Hardgrave Rd to Boundary St Bridge, 1-77, 10-78B

Drake St west from Hoogley St to Montague Rd, 1-37, 4-42

Drury St west from 467 Montague Rd to 63-67 Hill End Terrace, 1-47, 10-58

Duncan St south from 100 Victoria St (no access) via Kurilpa St to 33 Ferry Rd, 3-45, 2-50

Early Lane south from 18 Forbes St to 21 Drury St, 1-9, 2-10

Edgar St off Harriet between 17-19, 1-9, 4-8

Egbert St north from Victoria St, 1-13A, 6-18

Exeter St south from Vulture St to Granville St, 1-53, 4-42

Ferry Rd west from 419 Montague Rd to Riverside Drive (pedestrian access only), 1-51A, 4-60

Filmer St south from Beesley St with pedestrian and bicycle access to Kurilpa St

Forbes St west from 449-453 Montague Rd to 79 Hill End Terrace, 5-55A (Riverside Apts), 6-54

Ganges St west from Dornoch Terrace to Hoogley St 5-37, 2-30

Glenfield St east from Ryan and Miller St to 345 Boundary St, 1-35, 6-28

Granville St west from Boundary St to Hardgrave Rd 10-84, 9-51

Gray Rd east from Montague via Hoogley St, Lower Hardgrave Rd, and Doris St, 1-145, 2-130A (Kurilpa Community Child Care Centre)

Greet St south from Beesley St 6-8

Hardgrave Rd south from Jane St to Dornoch Terrace, 1-173, 2-178

Harriet St west from Crowther St to 360 Montague Rd, 1-35, 4-36

Hill End Terrace west from 479 Montague Rd and north to Riverside Drive, 3-79 (alias 54 Forbes), 4-114 designated on bank of Brisbane River) 114A+114B

Hoogley St south from Ganges St to Orleigh St, 7-39, 6-42

Horan St south from Jane St to Vulture St, 6-28

Ida St south from Roger St via 36B Mitchell St to Leitch Lane, 3A, 2-8

Jane St west from Boundary St via Montague Rd to Riverside Drive, 9-123, 6-120

Jumna St east from Hoogley St, 7-25, 6-24

Katrine St north from Dornoch Terrace (between 52-58) to Bristol St, 11-21, 10

Kurilpa St west from 363-367 Montague Rd to Riverside Drive (pedestrian access only), 3-55, 2-48A

Leitch Lane south from Raven St, 3, 2-8 (alias 36B Mitchell)

Loch St east from Hardgrave Rd to Katrine St, 5-51, 2-50

Lower Hardgrave Rd south from Dornoch Tce via Gray Rd to 110A Ryan St, 183 (aliaa 2 Ganges)-219, 188-224, continuation of numbering from Hardgrave Rd

Little Jane St north from Jane St, 7, 2-26A

Mitchell St west from Hardgrave Rd (between 157-165) to 4 Ida St, 1-35, 2-36B (alias 8 Leitch)

Montague Rd (part) south from Mollison St to Hill End Terrace and 75 Orleigh St, 201-487, 194-476

Morry St south from 33-37 Gray St via Ryan St to 25 Orleigh St, 5- 31, 8-249

Musgrave St west from Montague Rd to Buchanan St, 8, 19

O’Connell St south from Russell St to Besant St, 1-31, 2-24

Orleigh St west from Hoogley St at West End Ferry to 476 Montague Rd, 1A-75, (2-78 designated but bank of Brisbane River)

Paris St south from Vulture St to Granville St 5-45, 14-44

Pidgeon Close west from Montague Rd and south to Beesley St 9-11, 4-20

Princhester St south from Vulture St to Corbett St, 7-41, 8-40

Raven St west from Ida St to Montague Rd, 1-25, 4-30

Riverside Drive (part) south along the bank of the Brisbane River, 24-36

Rogers St west from Ida St via Montague Rd to Duncan St, 3-35, 4-60

Russell St (part) southwest to Boundary St 69-87, 38-56

Ryan St north from Cordeaux and east to Glenfield and Miller, 1-153, 8-144

Scott St west from Hardgrave Rd to Montague Rd, 1-17, 2-24

Skelton Lane east from Bank St, 5-15, 4

Skinner St west from Hardgrave Rd to Montague Rd, 7-39, 10-36

Spring St west from Boundary St to Hardgrave Rd 10-74, 7-71

Sussex St south from Vulture St 11-39, 4-34

Tarabay Lane south from Victoria St to Kurilpa St

Thomas St south from Jane St to Corbett St, 5-71, 8-70

Tondara Lane south from Kurilpa St to Rogers St, 3-35, 2(alias 367 Montague)-32

Turin St south from Vulture St to Granville St, 17-49, 14-50

Victoria St west from Hardgrave Rd to Riverside Drive, 1-89, 2-106

Vulture St (part) west from Boundary St to Montague Rd, 5-151A, 2-110

Whynot St west from Boundary St to Hardgrave Rd 10-72, 11-73

Wilson St west off Boundary St, 9-23, 6-18A

Wolfe St south from Beesley St.

== Planning and development ==
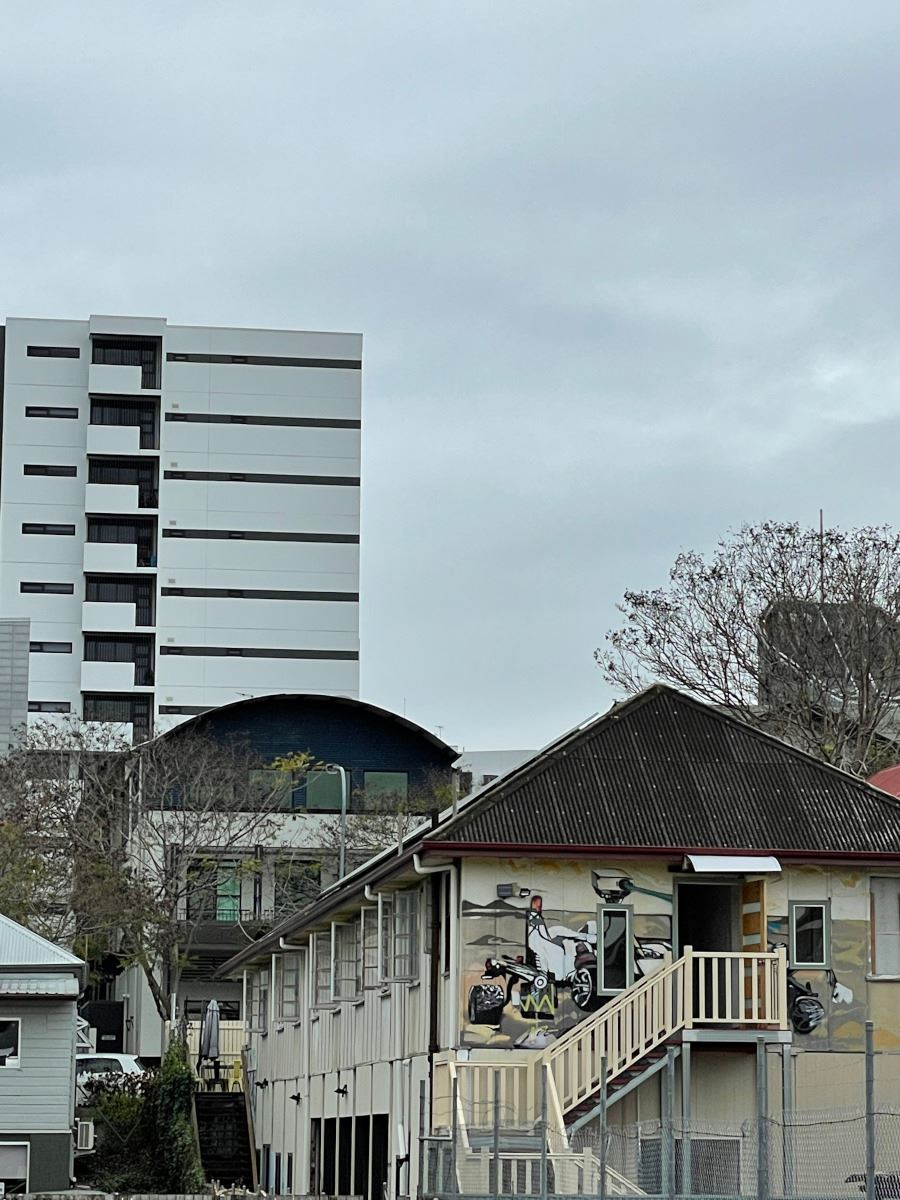
Changing skyline, West End, 2021

In 2005, just over 50% of the dwellings are standalone houses and 37% are higher density residential properties, including multi-storey blocks of apartments and units. Some houses are covered by historic preservation laws seeking to preserve the historical character e.g. tin roofing. Contrasting sharply with the historic homes are new buildings of contemporary designs. Prices for all types of properties have been increasing dramatically in recent decades. According to REIQ, the median unit/town-house price in West End for 2005 was $310,000, and the median house price is $490,500.

In May 2012, it was announced that the South Brisbane Riverside Neighbourhood Plan would be resubmitted to allow the construction of 12-storey buildings, considerably higher than the previous seven-storey limit. According to the Brisbane City Council's Neighbourhood Planning chairwoman, Amanda Cooper, there are six sites located between Montague Road and the Brisbane River, south of Davies Park, which are at least one-hectare in area, a requirement for construction of the increased building heights. The nature of some developments has led to community disquiet. The redevelopment of the Absoe site is a high-profile example.

As of January 2023, the median price for the preceding year was $1,682,500 for a house and $587,500 for an apartment. The median weekly rental for the same period was $740 for a house and $520 for an apartment.

== Economy ==
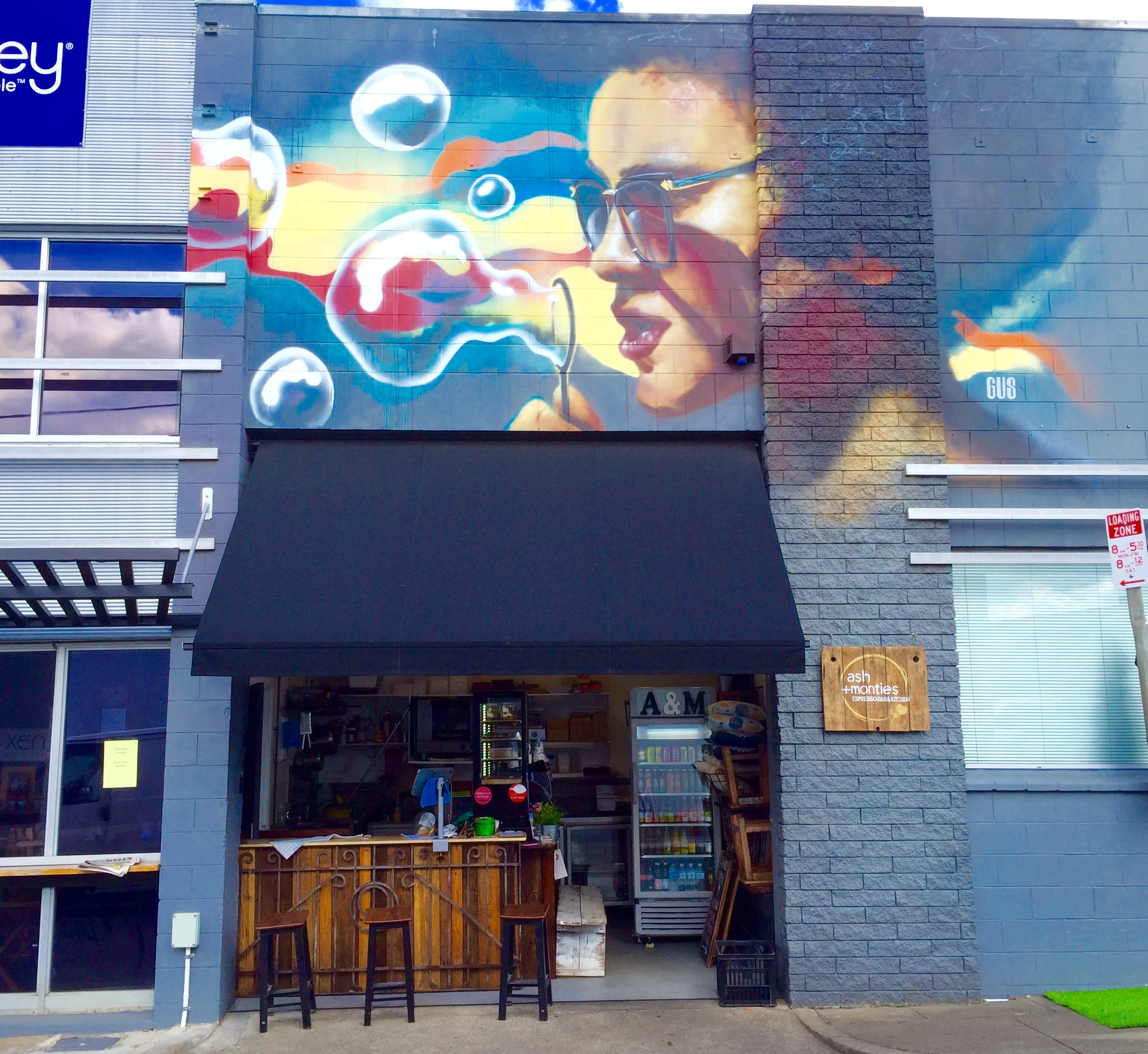
West End street art and cafe

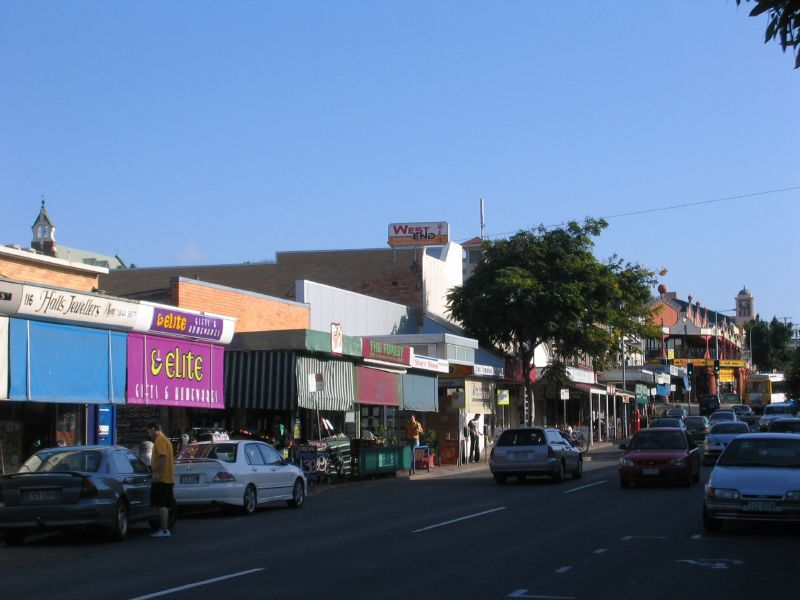
Ethnic shops lining Boundary Street

The area's major attraction is its café and restaurant scene, as well as its shopping, which is centred along Boundary Street. It is also known for its high concentration of ethnic and organic grocery stores. Davies Park on the riverside hosts one of the largest farmer's markets in Greater Brisbane every Saturday called the Green Flea Markets. Weekend 'brunch' culture is prevalent in West End, with numerous cafes and restaurants serving the area.

West End has an industrial backbone, in particular, along Montague Road down to Riverside Drive. Given the value of riverside property now that flooding is better managed, factories are now being sold to make way for upscale waterfront apartments. This is part of a plan to increase population densities in near-city suburbs. It will significantly affect the ability of working-class people to remain in the area and change the economic make-up of the area. As such, West End is currently undergoing urban renewal, with a large change in real estate prices, and new development changing the area demographic.

== Education ==
West End State School is a government primary (Prep–6) school for boys and girls at 24 Vulture Street (27.4804°S 153.0083°E). In 2018, the school had an enrolment of 1021 students with 71 teachers (61 full-time equivalent) and 32 non-teaching staff (23 full-time equivalent). In 2017, plans to expand the school's site were announced following a purchase of an adjacent block of land.

There is no secondary school in West End. The nearest government secondary school is Brisbane State High School in neighbouring South Brisbane to the east. This school is known for its academic excellence and demand for places outstrips supply. However students within its local catchment area are always able to attend this school, which drives up the price of real estate in suburbs within the catchment like West End as parents seek to buy or rent within the catchment to obtain enrolment in the school.

== Transport ==
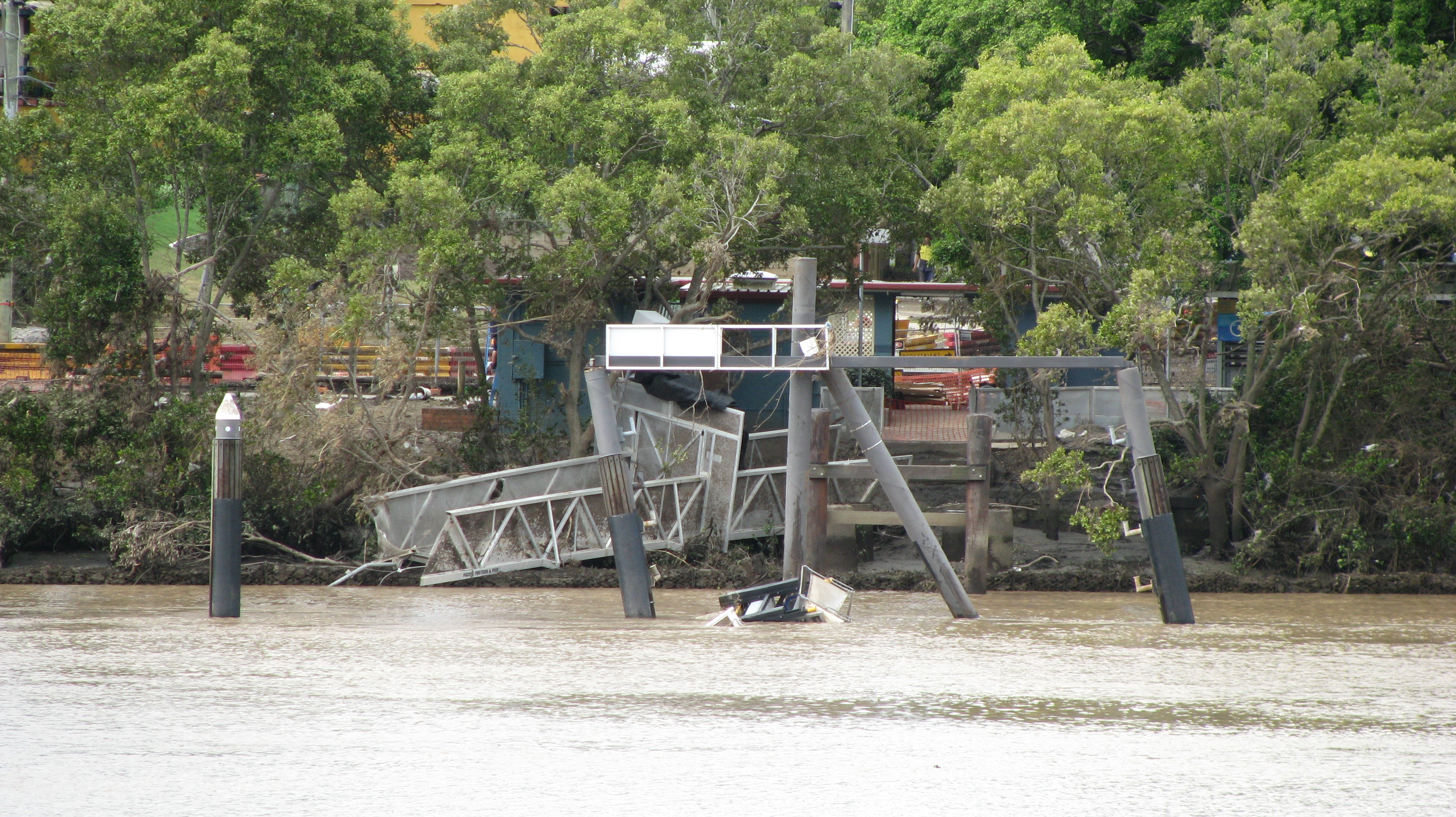
The West End ferry wharf was destroyed in the 2010–2011 Queensland floods

The suburb is well serviced by buses and ferries. Bus services include Route 199 BUZ to New Farm-City-West End Ferry, leaving every five minutes during peak times, Route 192 University of Queensland to City, Route 198 Highgate Hill Hail & Ride (Coles West End-PA Hospital-Woolloongabba-Vulture St-Coles West End) and a CityGlider service along Montague Road. Additionally, Route 86 Kurilpa Bus Loop, alternately known as the South Brisbane loop, is a free bus loop servicing parts of South Brisbane and West End that was introduced in January 2023. This loop was introduced partly to compensate for existing infrastructure delays from the Brisbane Metro transport project.

CityCat services leave from the West End ferry wharf in Orleigh Street. The ferry terminal, destroyed in the 2011 floods, was replaced and operating on 24 July 2011.

== Culture ==
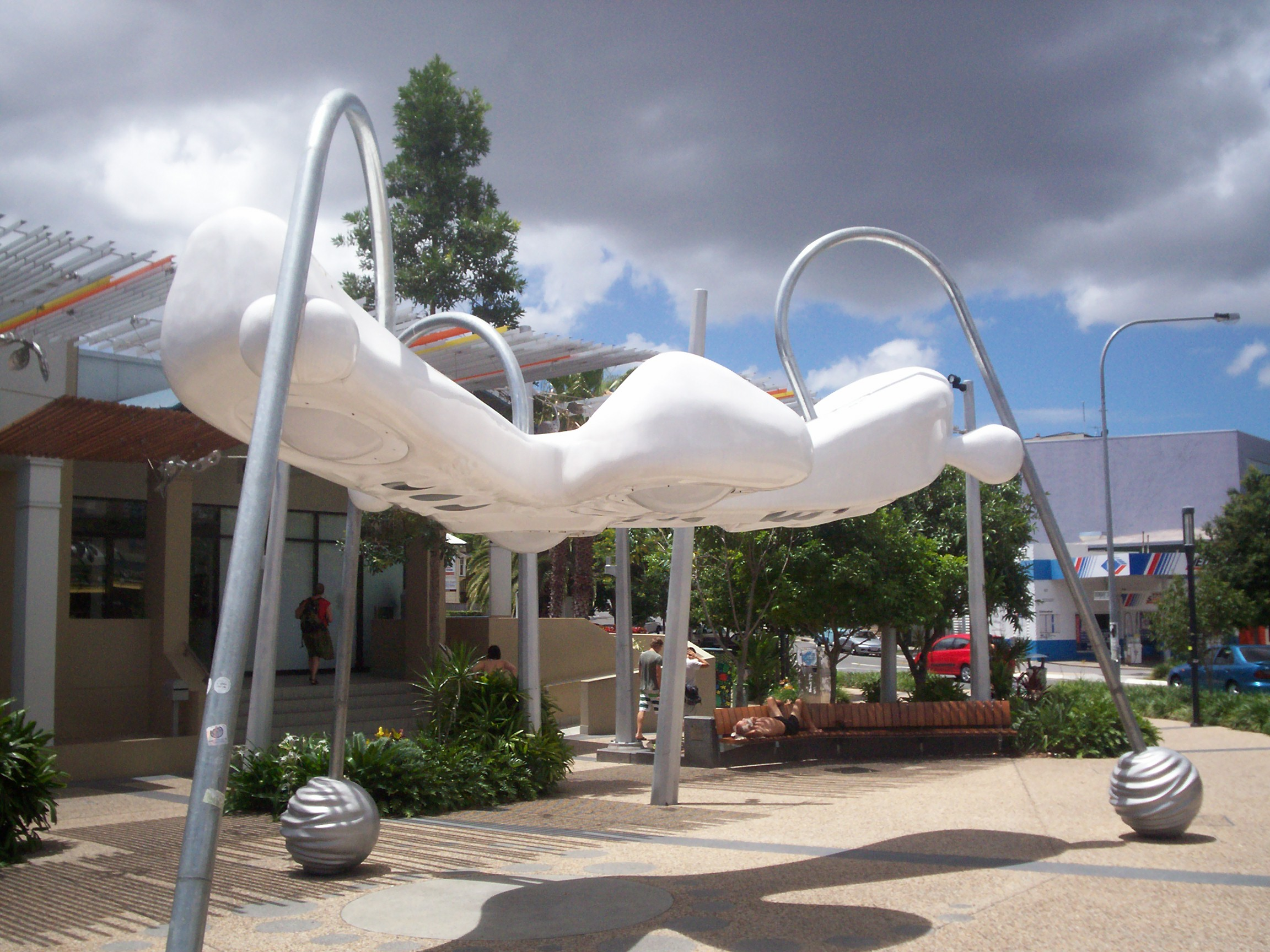
Street installation, 2007

West End has a number of galleries and artist-run initiatives which showcase the works of local artists. The neighbouring suburb of South Brisbane, the designated cultural precinct of Brisbane, is home to some of Queensland's most well-regarded cultural education institutions, such as the Queensland College of Art, the Queensland Conservatorium Griffith University, Queensland Performing Arts Centre. However, as Southbank is primarily commercial, many artists and students live in the much larger and residential West End.

== Amenities ==
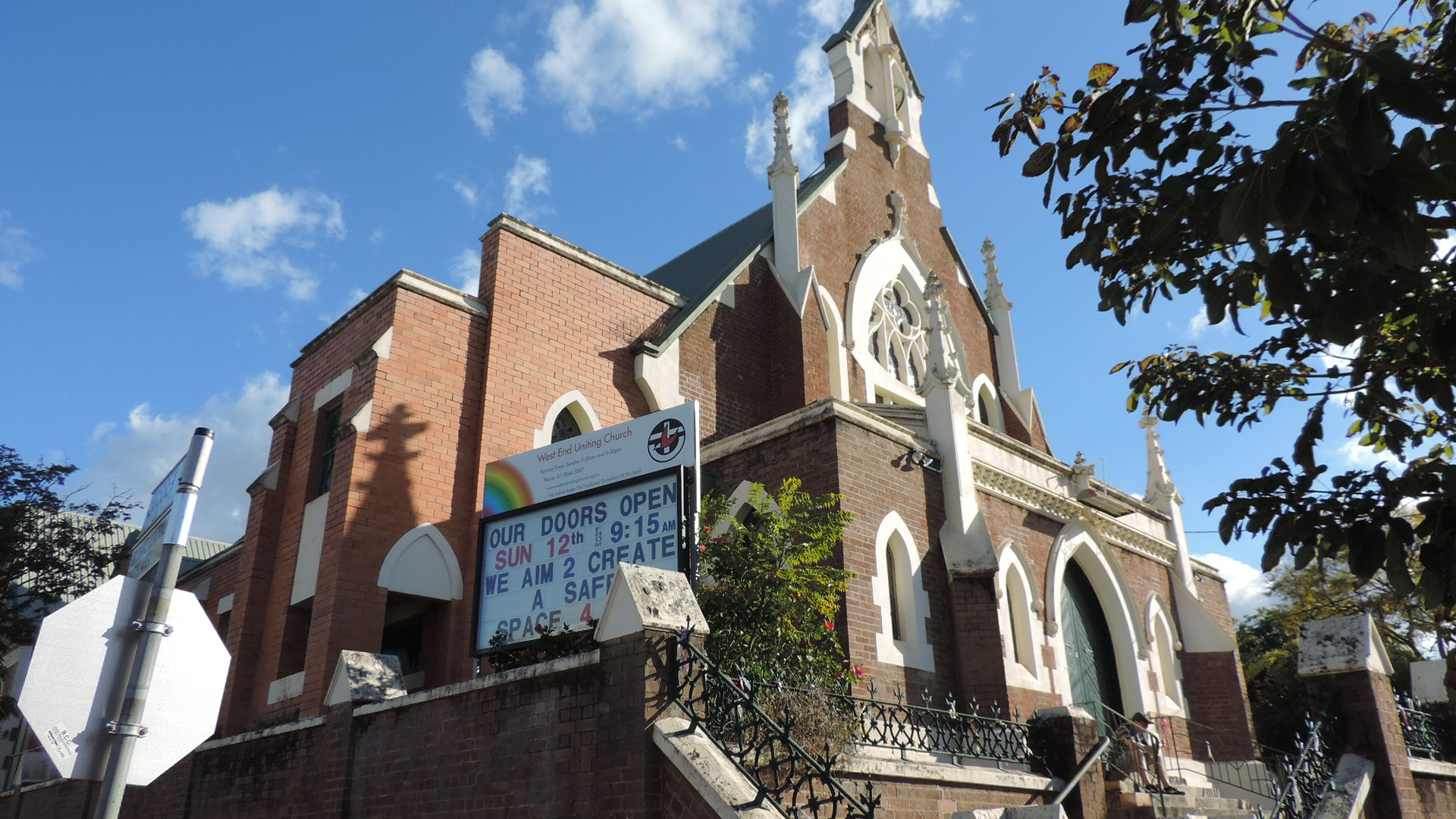
West End Uniting (formerly Methodist) Church, 2020

The Brisbane City Council operates a public library at 178–180 Boundary Street (currently known as West End Library but previously known as Kurilpa Library).

St Francis of Assisi Catholic Church is at 47–49 Dornoch Terrace (27.487151°S 153.0088°E). It is part of the Parish of Dutton Park served by the Capuchin Franciscan Friars. West End Uniting Church is at 113 Vulture St (27.481305°S 153.0128°E).

== Sport ==
Queensland Cup rugby league team, the Souths Logan Magpies, play their home games at Davies Park, West End (Bill Tyquin Oval). Prior to 2003, it was the famous Souths Magpies who competed on the Davies Park field, and renowned players such as Mal Meninga, Gary Belcher, Peter Jackson, Mick Veivers, Greg Veivers, Harold 'Mick' Crocker, Frank Drake, Mitch Brennan, Bob Lindner, Ash Lumby, Norm Carr, Richo Hill and Chris Phelan wore the black and white of the club. Current ARLC Chief John Grant was another ex-Souths player, representing Australia from the club, while veteran rugby league coach Wayne Bennett was a premiership-winning mentor with the Magpies in the mid-1980s. During the 1970s and 1980s, the Magpies were an institution in West End with their 1981 and 1985 Brisbane Rugby League grand final victories.

Along the river bank of Milton Reach can be found the rowing sheds of a number of Brisbane secondary schools such as Brisbane Grammar School and Brisbane State High School, as well as rowing clubs. Amongst these is the Commercial Rowing club. It was established in 1877 and is Queensland's oldest amateur sporting club.

The South Brisbane Sailing Club has its club house near Orleigh Park. The club was established in 1903 and has been located in West End since 1956.

== Open spaces ==
As of 2023, open spaces in West End include:

- Boundary Street Park, 349 Boundary Street (27.4900°S 153.0105°E)
- Bunyapa Park, 68 Vulture Street (27.48067°S 153.01113°E)
- Davies Park, 349 Boundary Street (27.4786°S 153.0044°E)
- Orleigh Park, 68 Hill End Terrace (27.4886°S 152.9984°E)
- two Ryan Street Parks, 115 & 147 Ryan Street (27.4901°S 153.0082°E, 27.4897°S 153.0073°E)
- South Brisbane Riverside Lands Park (27.47476°S 153.00695°E)
- West End Community Park, 155 Boundary Street (27.47976°S 153.01208°E)
- West End Riverside Lands Park, 60 Kurilpa Street (27.4826°S 152.9999°E)

Bunyapa Park at 68 Vulture Street was formerly called West End Urban Common. Its new name was suggested by Aboriginal activist Sam Watson, and the park was officially renamed in December 2017.

== See also ==
- Street Arts
