= Wanda Walha =

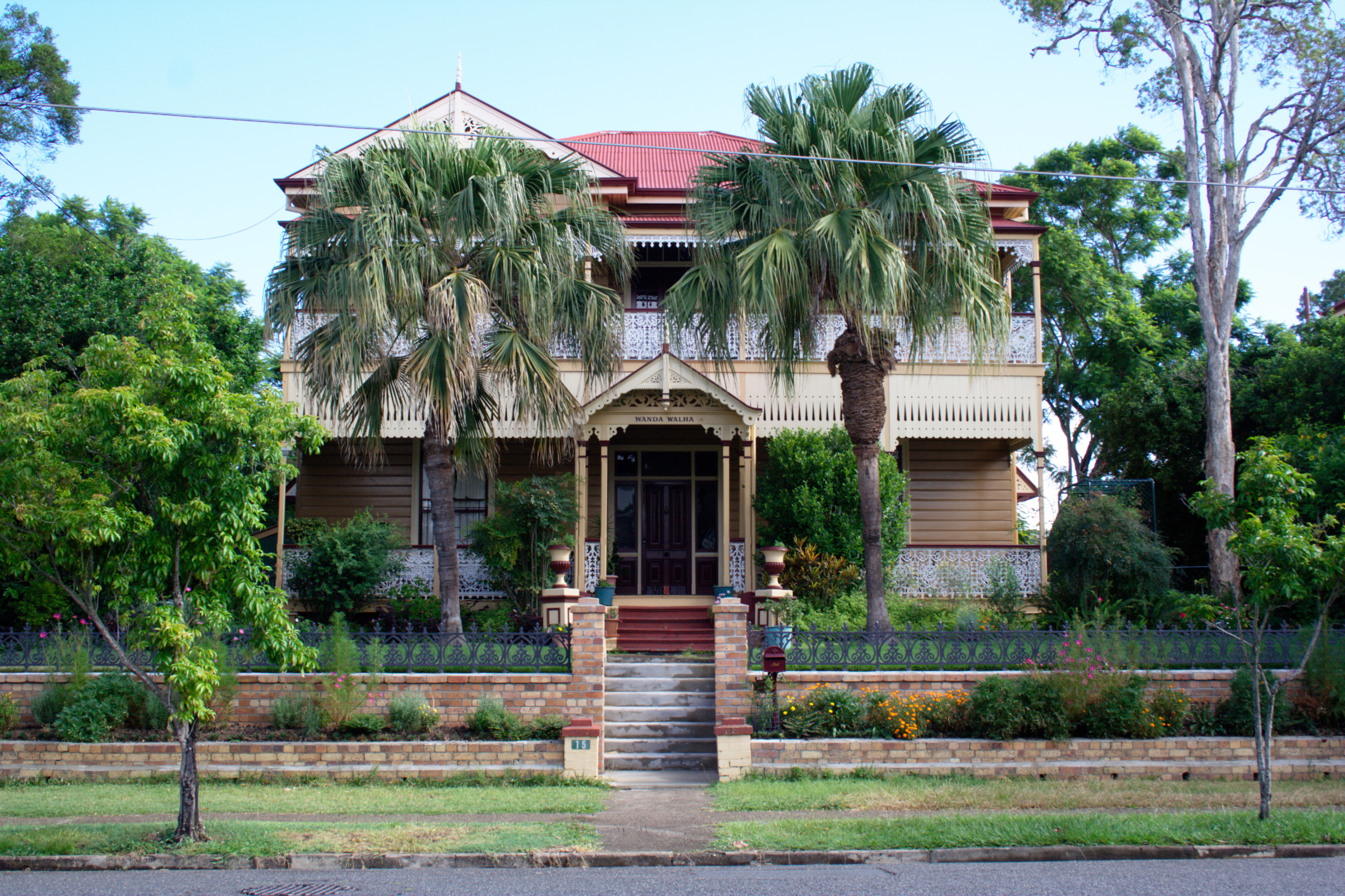

- Location within Queensland Location within Australia
- 27.4879°S 153.0013°E
- Location: 15 Gray Road, West End, Queensland, Australia

History
- Design period: 1870s–1890s (late 19th century)
- Built: 1886

Queensland Heritage Register
- Official name: Wanda Walha
- Type: state heritage (built)
- Designated: 21 October 1992
- Reference no.: 600228
- Significant period: 1880s (fabric, historical)
- Significant components: residential accommodation – main house

Wanda Walha is a heritage-listed detached house at 15 Gray Road, West End, Queensland, Australia. It was built in 1886. It was added to the Queensland Heritage Register on 21 October 1992.

== History ==
Wanda Walha was built in 1886 for successful merchant William Alexander Wilson. It was probably designed by his neighbour, the architect Arthur Morry.

Originally a grocer, Wilson was also a partner in the neighbouring West End Sawmill & Steam Joinery Co Ltd. This may explain the choice of timber as the material for Wanda Walha. He also built a number of other timber houses on his five-acre (2 hectare) property, for rental. From the early 1890s he also rented Wanda Walha.

In 1906 Wanda Walha became the home of Robert Scott, an accountant, who bought the house from Wilson in 1914. It remained in the Scott family until 1978 during which time it was converted into flats. During the early 1980s the house was refurbished and returned to its use as a family home.

== Description ==
Wanda Walha is a large two-storeyed timber residence with a double-storeyed front verandah.

The hipped corrugated iron roof features a projecting gable on the left side at the front. The verandah has cast iron posts and balusters. The wide decoratively notched valance on the lower level is in timber. A gabled frontispiece projects from the verandah at the centre.

Sash windows with timber hoods feature along the side elevations and there is an upstairs verandah at the rear.

A central hallway runs the length of the house with drawing and dining rooms, separated by cedar folding doors, on the right. A sitting room, study and a bedroom are on the left. The kitchen wing at the rear has been relocated at right angles to its original position. Upstairs are a further six bedrooms. The interior is austerely finished.

Although most of the house is original, much of the verandah decoration and the central staircase were removed in the conversion to flats. These have been replaced with copies of the originals.

== Heritage listing ==
Wanda Walha was listed on the Queensland Heritage Register on 21 October 1992 having satisfied the following criteria.

The place is important in demonstrating the principal characteristics of a particular class of cultural places.

Wanda Walha is significant as an example of an imposing timber house built on the southside for a successful businessman.

Wanda Walha is significant as a timber variation of a style usually associated with brick residences built during the 1880s boom.
