= Astrea, West End =

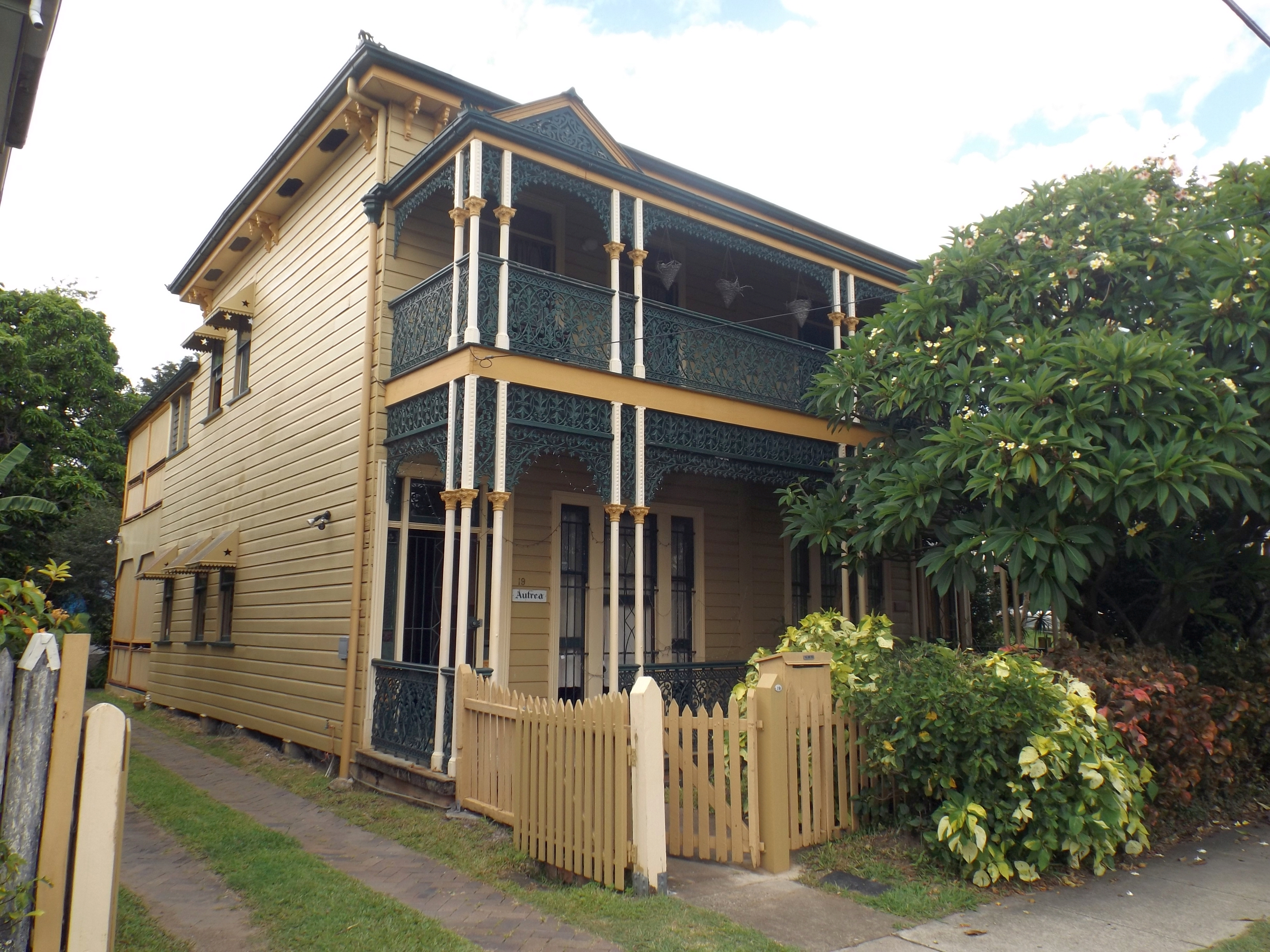
- Residence in 2015

- Location within Queensland Location within Australia
- 27.4777°S 153.0096°E
- Location: 19 Bank Street, West End, Queensland, Australia

History
- Design period: 1870s–1890s (late 19th century)
- Built: c. 1888
- Built for: Fedder Jensen

Queensland Heritage Register
- Official name: Astrea
- Type: state heritage (built)
- Designated: 21 October 1992
- Reference no.: 600341
- Significant period: 1880s (fabric, historical)
- Significant components: residential accommodation – maisonette/s / duplex

Astrea is a heritage-listed duplex (building) at 19 Bank Street, West End, Queensland, Australia. It was built c. 1888 for Fedder Jensen. It was added to the Queensland Heritage Register on 21 October 1992.

== History ==
Astrea, a two-storeyed timber building, was constructed c. 1888 as a pair of semi-detached houses. The architect may have been John Ibler, who in February 1888 called tenders for a pair of semi-detached brick and wood residences in Bank Street.

They were erected for Fedder Jensen as an investment, and rented to white collar tenants. These included his son Magnus Jensen, a solicitor and Member of the Queensland Legislative Council 1904–15, who is first listed in the post office directories as resident on the east side of Bank Street in 1888. In 1909 the building was sold to Thomas and Harriet Walters, who converted it into a single residence, and possibly gave it the name Astrea.

After falling into a state of disrepair Astrea was sold in 1981 and refurbished as a pair of semi-detached houses.

== Description ==
Astrea is a pair of two-storeyed semi-detached timber houses.

A double-storeyed verandah runs across the front of the building. This is ornately decorated with cast-iron valances, posts, frieze and balusters. The building has a single hipped roof in corrugated iron.

The separate identity of each house is highlighted by a small gable at either end of the top verandah, each with an intricate fretwork pediment. These are supported by double columns which continue down to the lower level and flank the entry on the ground floor.

Leadlight fan and sidelights surround the cedar panelled front doors. The internal joinery is also cedar.

During the conversion to a house, the brick party wall was opened and one staircase was removed. Recent refurbishment has included the replacement of these features as well as double-storeyed additions at the rear.

== Heritage listing ==
Astrea was listed on the Queensland Heritage Register on 21 October 1992 having satisfied the following criteria.

The place is important in demonstrating the evolution or pattern of Queensland's history.

Astrea at West End, erected c. 1888, is significant as a rare Brisbane example of a pair of semi-detached timber houses built in the late 19th century, and as an example of a speculative multiple housing venture of the 1880s boom period. They are important also in illustrating the development of West End in the years prior to the floods of 1890 and 1893.

The place demonstrates rare, uncommon or endangered aspects of Queensland's cultural heritage.

Astrea at West End, erected c. 1888, is significant as a rare Brisbane example of a pair of semi-detached timber houses built in the late 19th century, and as an example of a speculative multiple housing venture of the 1880s boom period.

The place is important in demonstrating the principal characteristics of a particular class of cultural places.

Astrea at West End, erected c. 1888, is significant as a rare Brisbane example of a pair of semi-detached timber houses built in the late 19th century, and as an example of a speculative multiple housing venture of the 1880s boom period.

The place is important because of its aesthetic significance.

Astrea has considerable aesthetic appeal, and contributes significantly to the historic West End townscape.
