= Kurilpa Library =

Heritage-listed library building in Brisbane, Australia

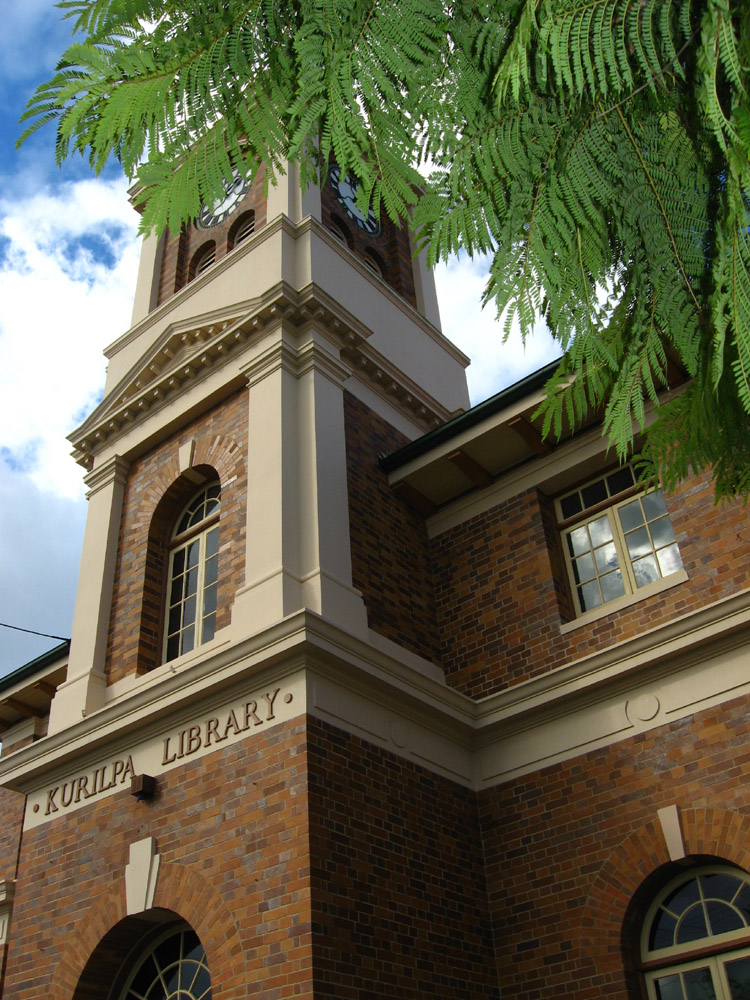
- Kurilpa Library, 2005

- Location within Queensland Location within Australia
- 27.4824°S 153.0121°E
- Location: 178 Boundary Street, West End, City of Brisbane, Queensland, Australia

History
- Built: 1923

Queensland Heritage Register
- Official name: Kurilpa Library
- Type: state heritage (built)
- Designated: 5 February 2007
- Reference no.: 602461
- Significant period: 1920s

Kurilpa Library is a heritage-listed library at 178 Boundary Street, West End, City of Brisbane, Queensland, Australia. It was built in 1929 and added to the Queensland Heritage Register on 5 February 2007. Despite being purpose-built as a municipal library, it was also sometimes referred to as the West End School of Arts. It now houses the West End Library, a branch of Brisbane City Council library system.

== History ==
The Kurilpa Library is a two-storey brick building with a projecting central clock tower and addresses the main street in the inner Brisbane suburb of West End. It was constructed by the Brisbane City Council and opened in 1929.

The provision of libraries by municipal councils in Queensland is a relatively new phenomenon, with most libraries currently operating having been established since the late 1940s. Previously, Schools of Arts and privately owned reading rooms provided books for loan by subscription. Schools of Arts or mechanics' institutes were established in Britain in the early 1800s with the declared intention of assisting self-improvement and promoting moral, social and intellectual growth, by providing lectures, classes and lending libraries to a rising middle class. At the time there were no public libraries and books were expensive, so that providing access to them for a moderate subscription was an important educational and recreational service. Local councils had sometimes subsidised Schools of Arts and were granted authority in the Local Government Act 1878 to establish and operate libraries, although this was very uncommon until the twentieth century. Kurilpa Library was the first publicly funded municipal library in Queensland and South Brisbane Library opened soon afterwards. However, local councils did not become seriously involved in the construction of libraries in Queensland until after the Libraries Act 1943 was passed which provided for the establishment of a State Library Board and the improvement of library services throughout the state.

The City of South Brisbane was at one time a municipality in its own right, but was amalgamated, together with the other local government authorities of the Brisbane area, into the Brisbane City Council in 1925. The South Brisbane Council urgently requested that its scheme for building a library at West End be progressed. They had been approached by the committee of the West End School of Arts for £2,000 in order to erect a new library with accommodation for a caretaker. Ernest Barstow, Alderman for Kurilpa, supported this request and the City Architect was requested to prepare plans and estimates.

The Kurilpa War Memorial Committee provided funding for a clock tower to commemorate the soldiers from the district. The clock played the Westminster Chimes every quarter-hour.

Kurilpa was the name given to a locality covering South Brisbane, West End and Hill End by local Aboriginal peoples. European settlers borrowed this name for a small township that grew up within West End, near the existing library and this name is inscribed on the library building.

The City Architect was Alfred Herbert Foster who served in this position from 1925 until his death in 1932. Alfred Herbert Foster was an articled pupil of noted architect George Henry Male Addison. He trained and worked in London for six years before returning to Brisbane and forming the practice of Stanley and Foster in 1902. He worked for the Queensland Government, and then became Architectural Assistant to the City Engineer in 1913. During his time as City Architect he designed several well-known municipal buildings including the Fortitude Valley Baths.

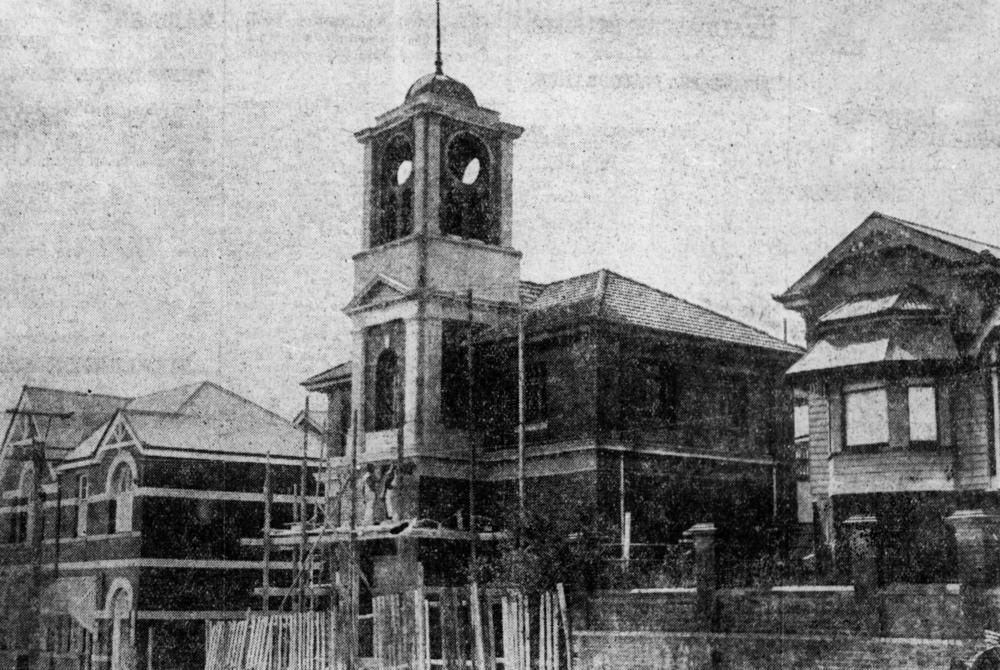
Kurilpa Library under construction, 1928

The building was completed in 1929 and was the first purpose-built municipal library in Queensland. The clock and tower formed a distinctive part of the building, emphasising its civic nature. The clock and chimes were unveiled by James Porter Fry, Member of the Queensland Legislative Assembly for Kurilpa on 21 April 1929. The construction of the library helped to reinforce and define the commercial and civic centre of West End. Although purpose-built as a library, the building was also referred to as the West End School of Arts in newspaper articles sometimes.

The rear verandah to both floors was enclosed in late 1959.

In the early 1980s complaints by neighbours lead to the chimes of the clock tower being decommissioned. However, they were restored in 2007 with a compromise of chiming only on the hour from 9am to 6pm on weekdays and 10am to 6pm on weekends.

== Description ==
Kurilpa Library is sited on Boundary Street, close to the intersection with Vulture Street and the commercial centre of West End.

It is a two-storey brick building with a central clock tower that also contains a peal of bells. It is neo Georgian in style, symmetrical in form and with classical references. The ground floor is higher than the first and rests on a rendered course contributing to the visual solidity of the base of the building. The openings on the ground floor are all of arched brickwork with moulded keystones. The main entrance has a pair of timber doors with a fanlight above and a prominent keystone.

The division between levels is emphasised by a moulded stringcourse and cornice. This carries the wording "KURILPA LIBRARY" above the entry in bronze lettering. Otherwise it consists of alternating moulded rectangles separated by circles.

The tower continues above the entry with plain pilasters supporting a moulded classical pediment with a dentilled cornice, and flanking another arched opening with a moulded keystone. The windows to each side of the tower on the first floor are square headed, as are those on the sides. Above them the eaves of the terracotta tiled hipped roof are decorated with a supporting row of brackets. The tower penetrates the roof form and continues up to a third storey. On each face it has a recessed arch with a hood mould containing a clock with Roman numerals above two smaller arches of fixed louvers. Plain pilasters run to either side of recesses from a heavily moulded base to a crisp cornice line. The copper dome has a small cast finial.

Inside, the small entrance lobby contains a bronze honour board on the right hand side. It opens onto a high-ceilinged room that occupies the whole of the original ground area and contains the library. To the rear of this is a narrow room created by the enclosure of the verandahs, which contains library support facilities. The upper floor has a large room used for meetings and two small offices. There is a tearoom to the rear in the enclosed verandah space. The clock tower is reached by an access hatch and contains a full peal of bells as well as the clock.

The front fence is designed to match the building, having pillars with moulded tops incorporating rosettes. The base of the fence is brick with a capping mould above, which is an iron railing of crosspieces with central circles similar to that of the entry balustrade. A low hedge is situated between the building and the fence.

The land behind the building is enclosed and contains a landscaped area directly behind the building and small car park.

== Heritage listing ==
Kurilpa Library was listed on the Queensland Heritage Register on 5 February 2007 having satisfied the following criteria.

The place is important in demonstrating the evolution or pattern of Queensland's history.

The Kurilpa Library is important in demonstrating the development of public lending libraries in Queensland. Purpose-built by the Brisbane City Council in 1929 before the Libraries Act of 1943 and the establishment of the State Library Board, it illustrates a transition between 19th-century subscription services, such as that provided by Schools of Arts, and the modern library network. The quality of the building and its prominent position illustrate the importance given to encouraging literacy and to reading as a recreation in the early 20th century It is important for its association with the development of the West End district, and is evidence for the provision of civic amenities in response to its growth in the early 20th century.

The place demonstrates rare, uncommon or endangered aspects of Queensland's cultural heritage.

The Kurilpa Library is rare as the first municipal lending library in Queensland.

The place is important because of its aesthetic significance.

The Kurilpa Library has aesthetic value as a well-composed public building in the neo-Georgian style. Its clock tower and prominent position on a major road contribute to the landmark.

The place has a strong or special association with a particular community or cultural group for social, cultural or spiritual reasons.

The Kurilpa Library has strong social significance to the community of West End and the surrounding area as a public lending library and meeting place for over eighty years.

The place has a special association with the life or work of a particular person, group or organisation of importance in Queensland's history.

The Kurilpa Library is important for its association with the life and work of A. H. Foster, Brisbane city architect between 1925 and 1932.

== Current use ==
The building is still in use as a library, and the upper-level rooms are used for meetings. As of 2021 It is a small local library, a branch of Brisbane City Council Library Service. It includes Vietnamese and Greek language materials in its collection.
