= West End Gasworks =

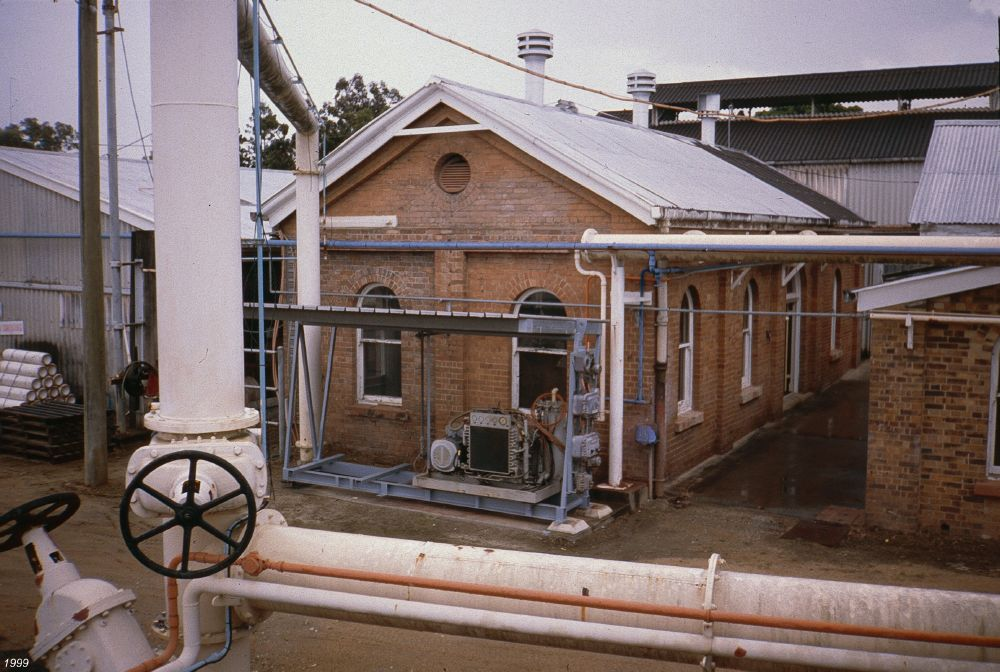
- West End Gasworks Distribution Centre, 1999

- Location within Queensland Location within Australia
- 27.4809°S 153.0038°E
- Location: 321 Montague Road, West End, Queensland, Australia

Queensland Heritage Register
- Official name: West End Gasworks Distribution Centre, South Brisbane Gas and Light Company Works, West End Gasworks
- Type: state heritage
- Designated: 22 October 1999
- Reference no.: 601595

West End Gasworks is a heritage-listed gasworks at 321 Montague Road, West End, Queensland, Australia. It is also known as South Brisbane Gas and Light Company Works. It was added to the Queensland Heritage Register on 22 October 1999.

== History ==
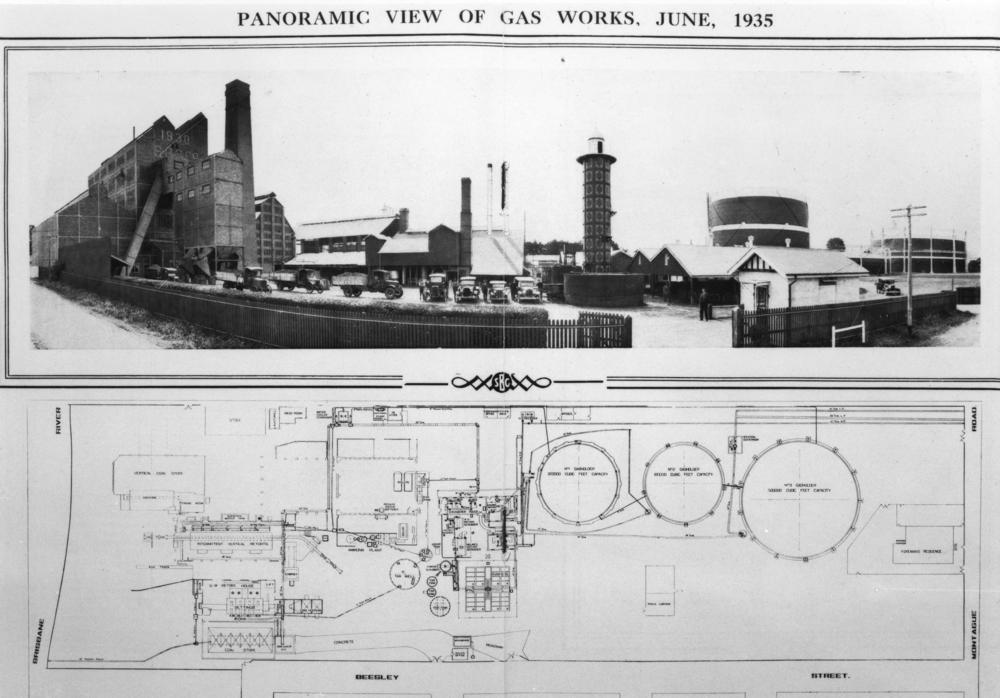
Panorama of the Gas Works, 1935

The West End Gasworks was established in June 1885 to supplement the Brisbane supply of gas.

Commercial gas supply originated in London in 1812, Sydney in 1841, Melbourne in 1856 and Brisbane in 1865, at Petrie Bight. The Brisbane Gas Company's main market was north of the Brisbane River, but supply had extended across the river to South Brisbane by 30 June 1885 when The South Brisbane Gas and Light Company Limited was registered.

From 1861 to 1864, Brisbane's population more than doubled, to 12,551. In the mid-1860s, Brisbane's infrastructure blossomed, with construction of the first cross-river bridge, a new Town Hall, a vastly improved water supply and its first gasworks. Commercial gas supply originated in London in 1812, Sydney in 1841 and Melbourne in 1856.

The Brisbane Municipal Council was anxious to provide street lighting, for which gas was seen as the only feasible system. Earlier in the decade, the Colonial Government, supposedly for health reasons, refused permission for the Council to establish a gasworks on a site at Petrie's Bight. On the same site, however, in 1864, the Government authorised private enterprise to establish this new public utility. Central to these decisions was the Minister for Lands and Works, Arthur Macalister, then at the epicentre of friction between the Government and the Brisbane Council, friction which has erupted on several occasions ever since.

The main demand for gas during the 1870s was probably for lighting, and the Municipal Council was almost certainly the Brisbane Gas Company's biggest customer. After the financial woes of the later 1860s there followed two decades of steady growth in Brisbane, reflected in an increase of demand for gas, for both lighting and for domestic and industrial fuel. Supply was expanded to, among other places, South Brisbane.

Just as the Brisbane Gas Company entered the market on a boom in the 1860s, so did its southside competitor on the 1880s boom. At this stage, heedless of floods that had been recorded in the past, the vigorous south side 1880s development included the Orleigh Estate, the West End Estate, the Montague Estate, the Whynot Estate and the Dornoch Terrace Estate. The South Brisbane Gas and Light Company works was close to the centre of development of residences that would need gas, gas stoves and coke for their bed and sitting room fireplaces. The new Gas Company would supply all these necessities.

A remote parcel of land was acquired later that year at Hockings paddock adjacent to the Brisbane River, to be supplemented by a further acquisition in 1891.

The original gasworks was designed by John Davies, the Company's first Engineer and Manager, appointed on 16 June 1885. Construction was complete and mains were laid by 22 December 1886, when the first gas was supplied. Reticulation materials were bought for use in crossing the Brisbane River and supplying outlets in Queen Street, already supplied by the Brisbane Gas Company from its Petrie Bight works. A price-cutting war lasted until 1889 when the companies, without any concerns about restrictive trade practices, carved Brisbane up into north and south of the river as their respective marketing territories. It was not until the Gas Act of 1916 that the Government saw fit to look more closely at the cosy arrangements between gas companies, which by that stage included the Wynnum and Manly Gas and Lighting Company Limited, formed in 1912. The Act dealt with product quality and pressure, and provided for gas inspectors. Price was also dealt with. (A later piece of legislation, the Profiteering Prevention Act, also encompassed gas).

An early map of the site shows two wharves in the river, one opposite the downstream end of the site and one a further short distance downstream of the site, apparently serving a neighbouring foundry. Early supplies of feedstock coal may have arrived by river. Later, coal was carted by lorries loaded from coal hoppers at the foot of the bank at the Albert Park side of Roma Street goods yards, c 1912. A weighbridge was constructed at the Beesley Street side of the site, presumably to measure incoming supplies of coal and outgoing sales of coke.

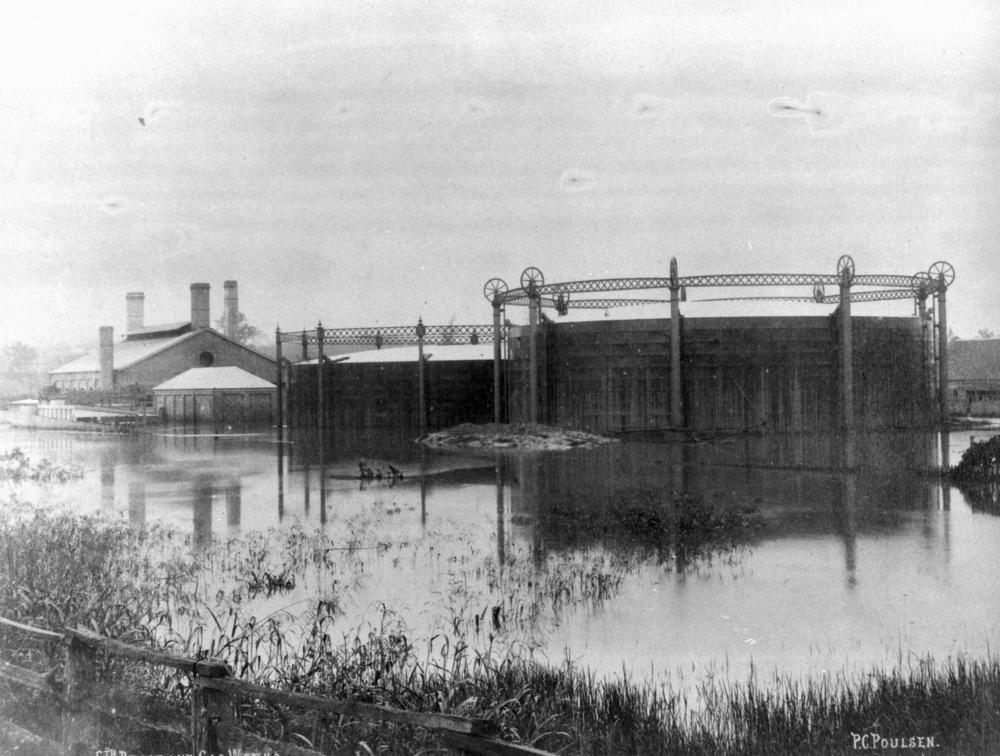
Gasworks in the 1890 flood

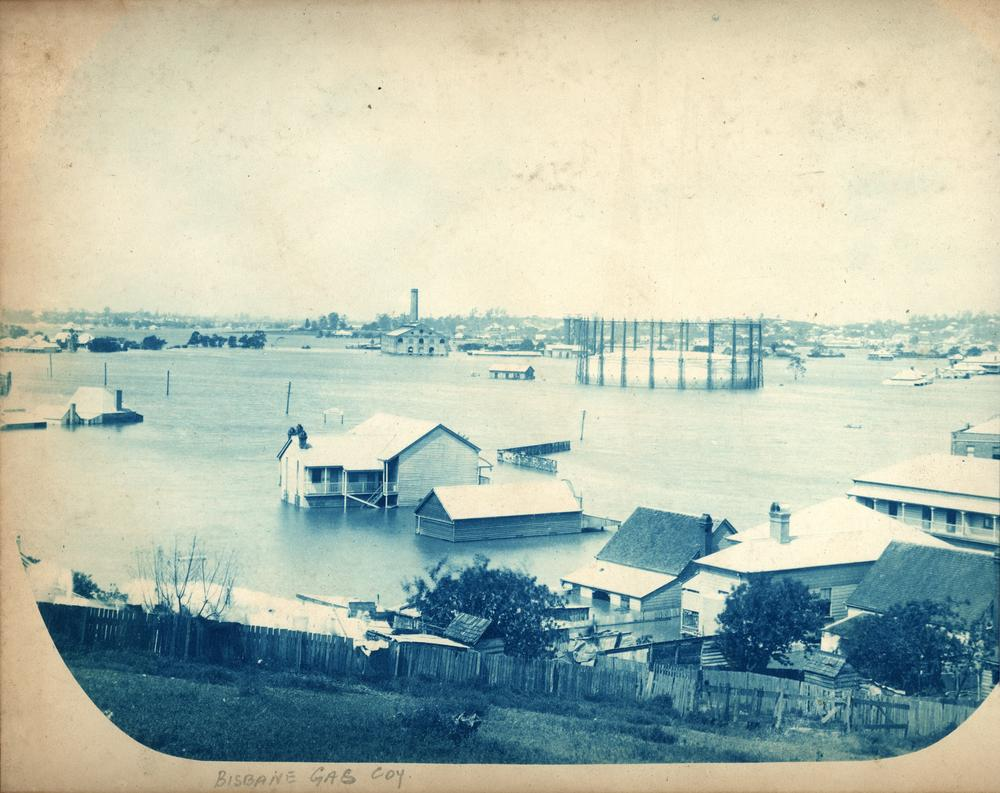
Mores serious flooding in 1893

The gasworks was flooded but not seriously damaged by a river flood in 1890. At that time the gasholders were of the frame-guided type, one controlled by counterbalances. The 1893 floods wrought severe damage, including destruction of the counterbalance gasholder. Importantly, much documentation, including engineering drawings on linen, was also lost. Following the flood, the City Engineer for South Brisbane, JS Louttit, recommended to his Council that, in view of the proneness to flooding of the gasworks, the Council should use electricity to light its streets. The flood not only severely damaged the works, but also reduced the size of the Company's market base. Many houses on the river flood plain, particularly on the Orleigh Estate, were destroyed, most of them less than 15 years old.

By 1914, the Company's engineer was William Summers Moore (1869–1925). Moore, a second generation Gas Engineer arrived in Australia in 1889, and was associated with Gas works in Victoria, Armidale NSW (appt. Manager in 1894) and Townsville. From 1903 until at least 1907, Moore was prominent in the Queensland Institute of Engineers, of which he was elected auditor in November 1905. Earlier that year, he presented a paper "An elevated inclined tramway" noted as a cheap method of handling coal. In October 1907, Moore presented a further paper, "Gas or internal combustion engines" in which he forecast the replacement by internal combustion of steam as a power source.

Following a visit by Moore to his home in England, to keep abreast of the latest developments in the gas industry, there was by 1914 a major revamp of the gasworks, of which there appear to be no technical details. However, there was a substantial increase in efficiency, the amount of gas per ton of coal increasing significantly during 1916–1918, and again in the years 1922–1924, with an overall improvement of 60%. William Moore died at his home, "Narara", Westbourne St., South Brisbane, 20 Jul 1925.

Moore's successor as Engineer and Manager, WH Shedden, designed the next revamp, brought on stream in June 1930. (Shedden was still employed by the Company in the 1950s). Work included a new Glover-West vertical retort house, the contractor being West's Gas Improvement Co. Ltd. of George Street, Sydney. There was again an improvement in efficiency, of about 13%.

As from 1930, the Company introduced high-pressure reticulation for all extensions in new areas. (With the introduction in the 1960s of natural gas, this 1930s innovation was assigned the name of Medium Pressure). This was effected by compressors, one of which, probably the first electric powered compressor used in the works, survives today as No.2 compressor.

In 1935, there were three gasholders on site, No.1 a triple or quadruple lift of the spiral guide type, No.2 a single lift frame-guided type and No.3 a double lift frame-guided type, all of which have since been retired or replaced. However, site inspection suggests that the same (brick) water tanks have been adapted and/or re-used for the later gasholders. Capacity in 1935 seems to have been 922,000 cu.ft., one of the holders probably being the same or of the same configuration (non-telescopic) as the one that survived the 1893 flood.

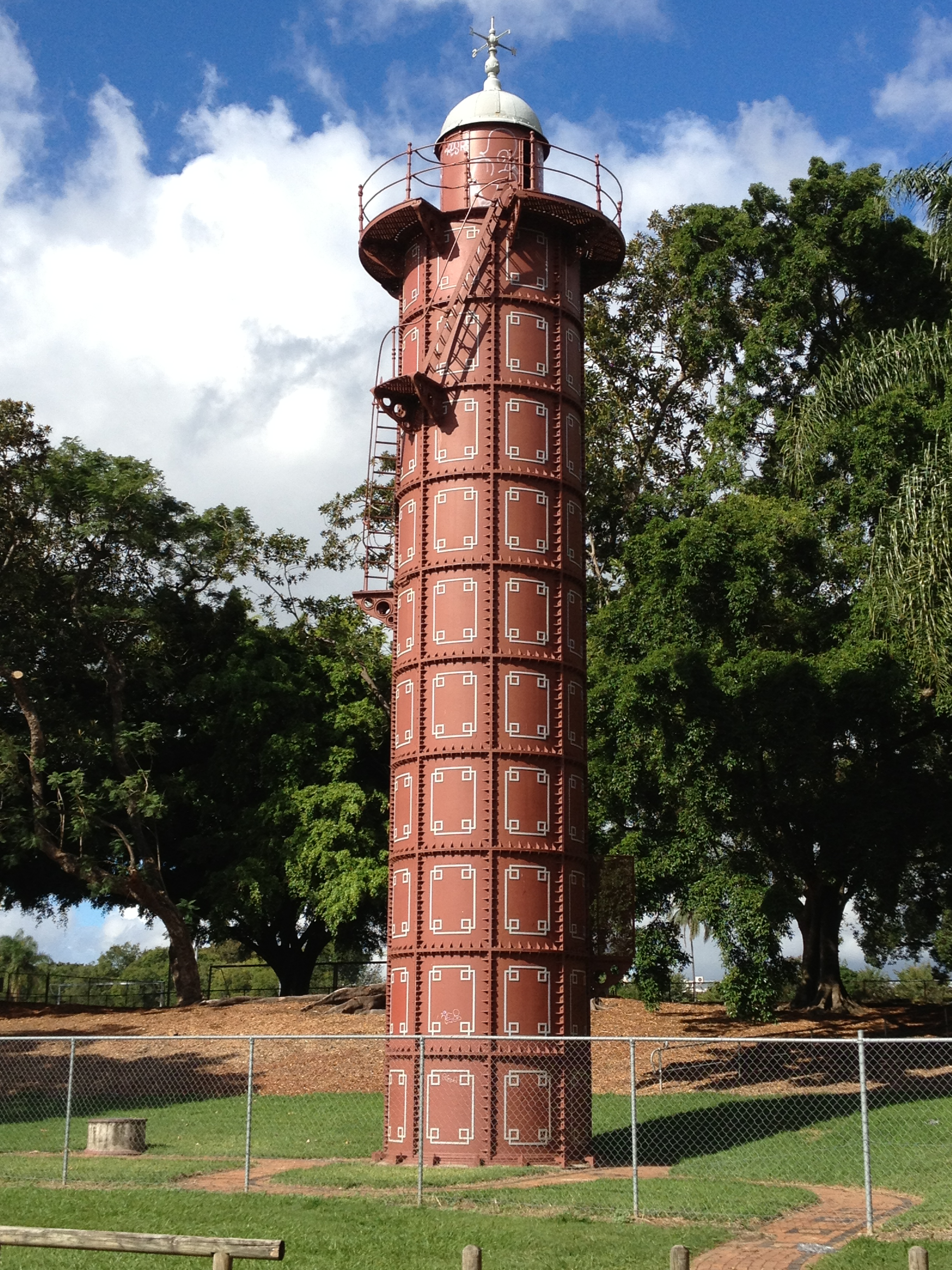
Gas Stripping Tower, now relocated to Davies Park

By 1948, capacities in the central and eastern gasholders had been significantly increased, to provide a total capacity of 1,517,000 cu.ft., and gasholders 1 and 3 had been re-numbered to 3 and 1 respectively. The 1912 cast iron scrubber, known as the Gas Stripping Tower, obsolete by 1948, was taken out of service at around this time, later to be re-located in nearby parkland.

The Company completed a further revamp during Shedden's management, in 1950, probably again to a Glover West design. At about this time, two new Holmes/Connersville compressors, No.1 and No.3, were installed in the compressor room on either side of a refurbished (No.2) Bryan Donkin compressor of about 1920s manufacture. All are still in the compressor room. No.3 is a variable speed unit, enabling accurate control of the pressurising function.

Also at about this time, a standby gas-engine powered alternator/generator was installed, along with a main switchboard of significant proportions. These are housed in a compartment attached to what was described in 1994 as the Engine Drivers Room. In 1948, meters and valves occupied this space, the building probably being known as the Meter House. Both the meters and the compressors were housed in gabled brick buildings with arched sash windows. The east fronts of these two buildings are aligned and form an elegant pair when viewed from the east.

With the advent in the late 1960s of natural gas, the South Brisbane Gas Company decided to move as soon as possible to the new feedstock. In December 1969, the old town gas plant was retired, and the retort house stood idle until it was demolished in 1974. In 1971, the Company name was changed to Allgas Energy Ltd.

The 1974 flood wrought further havoc with Company documentation, the rescue of which understandably held low priority in the flood aftermath. Both Stanley Street office and Montague Road works were flooded. Demolition of most of the manufacturing and purification plant proceeded in 1974 and 1975. There remains no evidence on the site of any part of the carbonisation process, nor of tar or ammonia production or storage.

In due course, the vacant part of the old site was disposed of and redeveloped as lot 1 on RP 141824. The remaining lot 2 was retained and part of the site was redeveloped as an outlet for natural gas for vehicles (NGV). However, all three of the gasholders were retained in service, along with the off-site 739,600 cu. ft. gasholder at Ekibin (Stephens Mountain). In 1992, all three at West End were of the spiral guide type and still in service.

By 1994, the site was described as the West End Distribution Centre. No.1 and Ekibin gasholders were both serviceable, the other two being out of service. No.1 is a 4-lift gasholder, Ekibin was a 3-lift. At that stage, No.1 was linked to the compressors to provide emergency service if required, such as during load shedding or maintenance work on the high-pressure natural gas feed to the site. The contents of the gasholder could only be fed into the medium pressure system with compressor assistance or directly to the low-pressure system if the holder were at least two lifts full. That facility is no longer available, the compressors and No.1 gasholder being more or less intact but out of service by September 1999. The Ekibin gasholder was dismantled earlier in 1999 allegedly to facilitate upgrading of the SE freeway.

The place was entered in the Queensland Heritage Register on 24 March 2000. In 2003 the Queensland Heritage Council approved demolition of what remained of the gasworks on condition that the place be photographically recorded prior to demolition; an interpretation plan be implemented; the gate, gateposts, fence and the governor be retained off-site; the gate, gateposts and fence be reinstated; and the governor be incorporated into the new development.

== Description ==
All items of gas manufacture, such as retort houses, exhausters, condensers, scrubbers, washers, purifiers have been demolished. Most of these lay on the western side of the original site, which has now been redeveloped and is a separate parcel of land.

The following items of historic engineering interest remained at the place in September 1999; however were later demolished or removed and retained for use in redevelopment of the allotment:

- No.1 four-lift spiral-guided riveted construction gasholder, built probably in the 1940s, empty and open to the atmosphere, sitting in a brick tank of approximately 38 metres (125 ft) diameter and approximately 6 metres (20 ft) deep, probably constructed as part of the 1930 revamp. Capacity 908,000 cu ft. Height when full: approximately 24 metres (79 ft). The spherical crown of the bell is approximately 2 metres (6 ft 7 in) high.
- No.2 gasholder brick tank, approximately 24 metres (79 ft) diameter, fenced off and containing contaminated water.
- No.3 gasholder brick tank, approximately 24 metres (79 ft) diameter, filled with earth.
- A dismantled weighbridge stowed remote from its original well, which remains beside the Beesley Street fence.
- A governor, by W Parkinson of London, housed in a small brick stuccoed building, adjacent to No.1 gasholder. Date of manufacture and original installation estimated to be 1880s.
- The laboratory and its apparatus contents, housed in a brick stuccoed building located on the northern boundary of the site.
- The compressor house, a single storey gabled brick building measuring approximately 15 by 7 metres (49 ft × 23 ft) in plan, housing compressors in the compressor room as follows:
  - No.1, Holmes (Huddersfield) Connersville Booster size 14 by 21 inches (360 mm × 530 mm) SHS, capacity 4,250 cubic metres (150,000 cu ft) per hour at 520 rpm, date of manufacture 1949; driven by a Lancashire Dynamo and Crypto Ltd electric motor, 3 phase 440 volt, 103 amp 85 BHP at 1460 rpm, date of manufacture 1952.
  - Nos. 2a and 2b, each 850 cubic metres (30,000 cu ft) per hour, Bryan Donkin Co Ltd, Chesterfield; driven by a Crompton Parkinson (Australia) Proprietary Limited electric motor, 3 phase continuous rating 400/440 volt, 36 amp 38 BHP at 1400 rpm, date of manufacture unknown. Reducing gears Radicon Redman by The Richardson Gears Pty Ltd, Victoria
  - No.3, Holmes (Huddersfield) Connersville Booster size 12 by 18 inches (300 by 460 mm) SHS, capacity 2,800 cubic metres (99,000 cu ft) per hour at 575 rpm, date of manufacture 1950; driven by a Vaskawa Electric (Japan) 67 kilowatts (90 hp) 3-phase variable speed induction motor through a variable speed coupling, date of manufacture 1974.
- The southern half of the building features a sunken area in which pipes are run to and from the compressors. Steel grating is laid over the pipe space, which is currently partly flooded.
- The Engine Drivers Room, formerly a meter room, in a single storey gabled brick building, of proportions similar to but slightly larger than those of the compressor house.
- The Standby Alternator House, containing
- Standby Brush alternator/generator, the DC element of 96 kW output, date of manufacture 1951, powered by a Type M4A5 gas engine of 137.5 maximum BHP at 1000 rpm.
- The switchboard, probably dating from about 1930. (Energised as at 22.9.99).
- The cylindrical riveted receiver vessel, mounted on two concrete piers and located against the north fence near No.3 gasholder. This vessel would receive and store compressed material required to service the medium pressure mains, from about 1930. The receiver has inlet and outlet pipes of 12 inches (300 mm) diameter at either end.
- An Art Deco-inspired rendered masonry fence with gate posts, metal balustrade inserts and gates runs the length of the allotment boundary with Montague Road.

== Heritage listing ==
West End Gasworks Distribution Centre was listed on the Queensland Heritage Register on 22 October 1999 having satisfied the following criteria.

The place is important in demonstrating the evolution or pattern of Queensland's history.

The place and the equipment installed on and in the West End Gasworks Distribution Centre demonstrate the growth and development pattern of the reticulation of a vital public utility, the gas supply and its infrastructure, in South Brisbane and southern Brisbane suburbs from the 1880s boom through to the 1990s. They reflect the economic and social development of South Brisbane and the southern suburbs of Brisbane.

The place demonstrates rare, uncommon or endangered aspects of Queensland's cultural heritage.

The remaining gasholder is the last of the spiral guide type remaining in Brisbane, and probably in Queensland. Three of five remaining low-pressure gasholders used to store and deliver town gas in Brisbane have been dismantled within the last year. Since 1992, two gasholders at the site have been removed. The West End gasholder is now one of only two remaining in Brisbane, possibly in Queensland, and is unfortunately but unquestionably rare. The station governor is unique of its type in Brisbane, and probably in Queensland.

The place is important in demonstrating the principal characteristics of a particular class of cultural places.

One of the principal characteristics of early gasworks is the gasholder storage and compressor and other necessarily robust but sensitive and reliable machinery and apparatus required for filling and drawing from the storage. At the West End site, the remaining gasholder, the three brick gasholder tanks, the compressors, the compressor room/house, the receiver vessel and the governor clearly demonstrate these characteristics of the gasworks.

The gasholder brick tanks illustrate major industrial use of brickwork from the 1880s up to the 1930s; and the compressors are exemplary of the change from steam powered to electric motor powered gas pumps.

The place is important because of its aesthetic significance.

Large round structures are unusual and have aesthetic value, particularly in areas of predominantly angular commercial and industrial construction such as West End. Aesthetically, the cylindrical gasholder with its spherical crown, even when empty, is both interesting and elegant. Also, the adjoining circular brick tanks contribute positively to the aesthetics of the site. The two largest remaining brick buildings on the site, one housing the compressors (themselves visually interesting), are attractive, aesthetically pleasing, early industrial structures.

The place is important in demonstrating a high degree of creative or technical achievement at a particular period.

As long ago as 1930, Engineer and Manager JH Shedden recommended introduction of high-pressure gas distribution. His recommendation was accepted, paving the way for future expansion of the area of supply from the gasworks. The receiver vessel at the northern boundary of the site was constructed to receive compressed gas from the compressor room, and remains as evidence of this development.
