= South Brisbane =

- Suburb
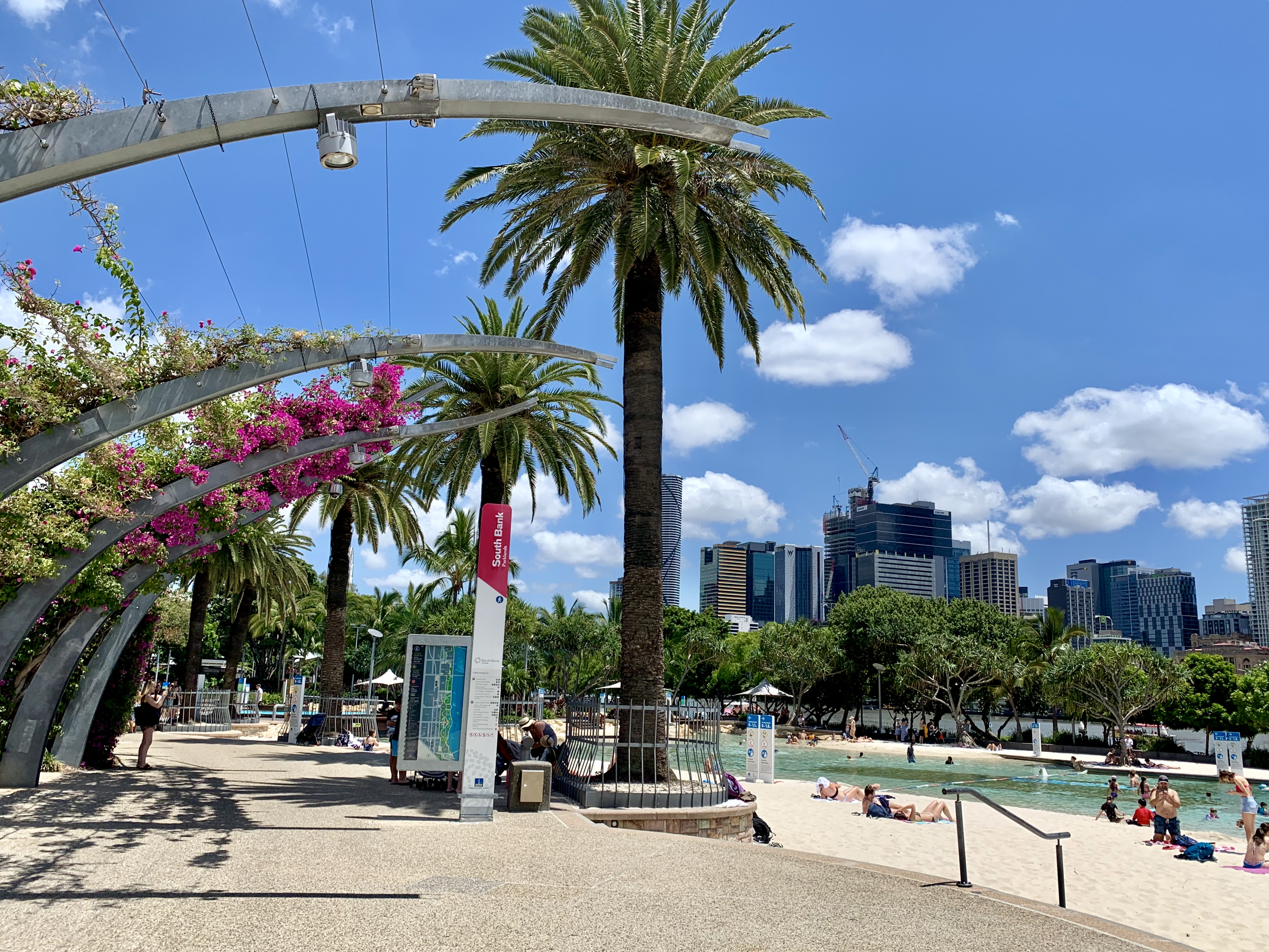
- Streets Beach in South Bank Parklands

- Interactive map of South Brisbane
- Coordinates: 27.4802°S 153.0205°E
- Country: Australia
- State: Queensland
- City: Brisbane
- LGA: City of Brisbane (The Gabba Ward)
- Location: 1.6 km (0.99 mi) SW of Brisbane CBD

Government
  - State electorate: South Brisbane
  - Federal division: Griffith

Area
  - Total: 2.3 km^{2} (0.89 sq mi)

Population
  - Total: 14,292 (2021 census)
  - Density: 6,210/km^{2} (16,100/sq mi)
- Time zone: UTC+10:00 (AEST)
- Postcode: 4101
Suburbs around South Brisbane
Milton	Brisbane CBD	Brisbane CBD
West End	South Brisbane	Kangaroo Point
Highgate Hill	Dutton Park	Woolloongabba

South Brisbane is an inner southern suburb in the City of Brisbane, Queensland, Australia. In the 2021 census, South Brisbane had a population of 14,292 people.

== Geography ==
South Brisbane is on the southern bank of the Brisbane River, bounded to the north-west, north, and east by the median of the river. It adjoins the suburbs of Woolloongabba to the east, Highgate Hill to the south, and West End to the southwest. The river to the east of South Brisbane is the South Brisbane Reach.(27.4738°S 153.0222°E). The suburb is directly connected to the central business district across the river by the following bridges (upstream to downstream):

- Go Between Bridge (toll road, 27.4700°S 153.0124°E)
- Merivale Bridge (rail, 27.4696°S 153.0132°E)
- William Jolly Bridge (road, 27.4691°S 153.0156°E)
- Kurilpa Bridge (pedestrian/cycling, 27.4695°S 153.0177°E)
- Victoria Bridge (busses/pedestrian/cycling 27.4726°S 153.0206°E)
- Neville Bonner Bridge (pedestrian, 27.4746°S 153.0224°E)
- Goodwill Bridge (pedestrian/cycling, 27.4808°S 153.0268°E).

Modern public transport services include suburban train stations at South Brisbane and South Bank, and South East Busway stations at Cultural Centre, South Bank, and Mater Hill. CityCat ferry services link South Brisbane to other riverside suburbs.

== History ==
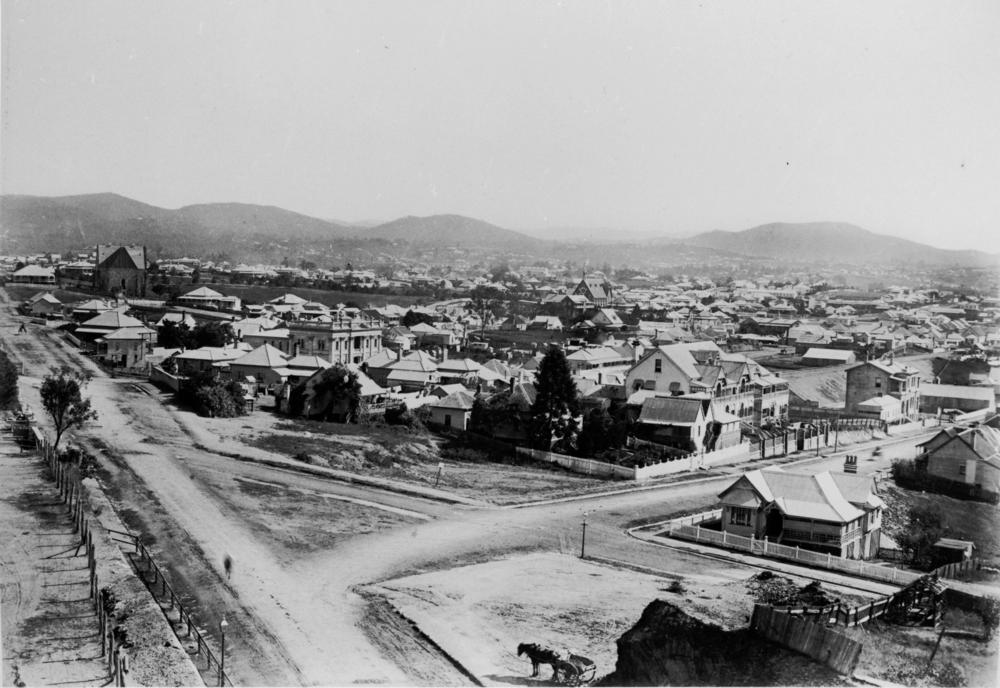
View of South Brisbane c.1895

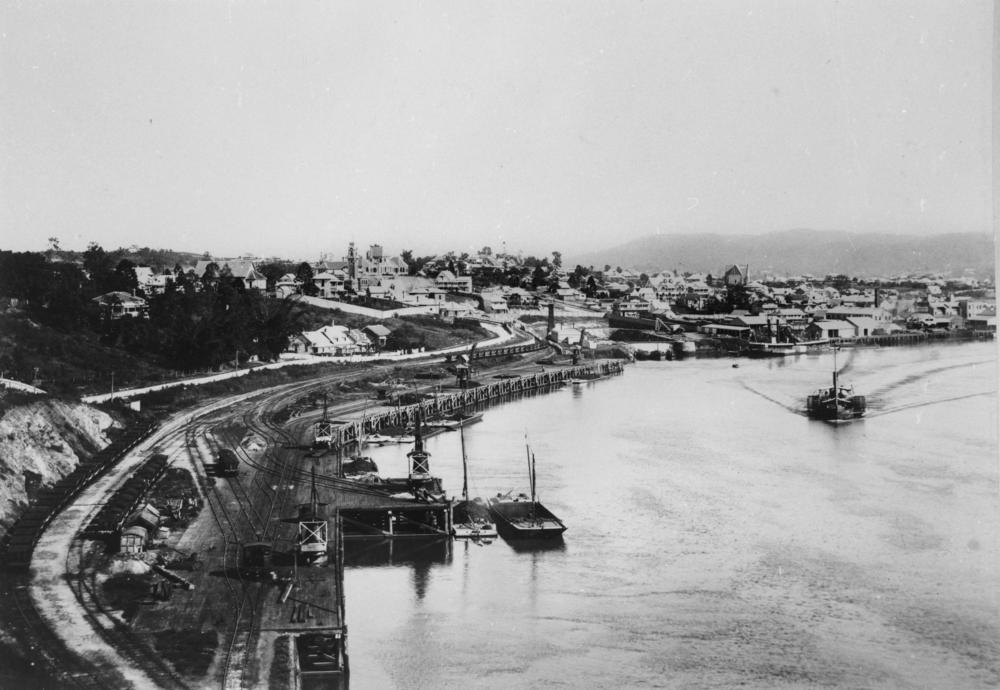
View from River Terrace c.1895

=== Pre-colonial times ===
South Brisbane, together with West End and Highgate Hill, is known as Kurilpa (meaning water rat) by the local Indigenous people, and the area remains important in Aboriginal life. Musgrave Park has been for many years a place of congregation for the Murri peoples of south-east Queensland. It is the site of a bora ring that has been buried. The Ngundari (possibly a Turrbal group) and Jagara peoples were drawn to the river at South Brisbane for fishing and gunyah building.

=== 19th century: European settlement ===
The area was named South Brisbane because it was on the south side of the Brisbane River, relative to North Brisbane (now the present Brisbane central business district) during the era of the Moreton Bay penal colony (1824–1842). The name Brisbane comes from the name of the river, which in turn was named by explorer John Oxley in 1823 after Sir Thomas Brisbane, then the Governor of New South Wales.

European settlement commenced with the first land sales in 1843, followed by the development of wharves along the bank of the Brisbane River. The first street in the area was called Stanley Quay, later to become Stanley Street.

In December 1849, the Church of England obtained a block of land facing Melbourne Street and extending to Grey Street and Stanley Street (approx 27.4736°S 153.0185°E, now the site of the Queensland Museum), a total of 1 acre, 3 roods, 8 perches of land, on which to erect a church, a school and a parsonage. However it is not until August 1858 that the school house was constructed on the site with the expectation that it would also be used for "occasional" public worship. The building was 43 by 23 feet (13.1 by 7.0 m) of hammer-dressed stone. On 6 September 1858 Miss Clothier opens a school there. In 1859 it is described as an "English Church" at "South Brisbane". By May 1862 the church has a resident minister enabling regular services. The church was adversely impacted by the construction of the 1874 Victoria Bridge as the bridge was higher and the approach roads had to be built up accordingly, resulting in the church being below the new road level, forcing the parishioners to approach the church from the rear. It is unclear when the church was named for St Thomas but that name is in use by October 1877.

Commercial buildings and hotels developed around the Russell Street area. By the 1850s there were over 100 residences in the area. Due to its proximity to wharves the area became the place where bullock drovers stayed and relaxed. Thomas Baines visited Brisbane in 1855 and depicted South Brisbane in a painting titled 'South Brisbane from North Brisbane', 13 years later. South Brisbane Recreation Reserve (now known as Musgrave Park) was created in 1856.

The first Presbyterian church in the district was built in Grey Street near Melbourne Street (approx 27.4745°S 153.0183°E) by John Graham. It was a small weatherboard church and was officially opened on 25 May 1851 by the Reverend Thomas Mowbray. After the congregation relocated to the Park Presbyterian Church in 1885, the Grey Street building was sold and used for storage. The old Grey Street church was sold to a private firm and used for storage. Later the site was resumed and the church building demolished for the construction of the present South Brisbane railway station.

A Baptist Sunday school operated in South Brisbane from 1857, but it was not until July 1872 that a congregation was formed, meeting in the South Brisbane Mechanics Institute. On Sunday 17 May 1974 the Vulture Street Baptist Church opened at 218 Vulture Street (corner of Christie Street, 27.4831°S 153.0275°E). It was later renamed the South Brisbane Baptist Church. The church was rebuilt in 1966, reopening on 10 December 1966. In 2003 it was renamed the South Bank Baptist Church to reflect its proximity to the South Bank Parklands. It was demolished in early 2013 when the congregation moved to a new church at 859 Stanley Street, Woolloongabba, renaming itself as Church@TheGabba.

In October 1863 Bishop James Quinn called for tenders to erect a Roman Catholic church in South Brisbane. The small wooden St Mary's Church was built on the southern corner of Merivale Street and Peel Street (in the carpark of the current church, 27.4736°S 153.0153°E) and was opened on 2 July 1865 by Bishop Quinn. A school was established at St Mary's Catholic Church with a lay teacher in 1866. St Mary's School opened at the school in 1870 operated by Mother Mary MacKillop and her Sisters of St Joseph of the Sacred Heart. The long-running disputes between MacKillop and James Quinn, the Roman Catholic Archbishop of Brisbane, resulted Quinn expelling the Sisters from his diocese in 1880, but the school continued to operate nonetheless.

South Brisbane State School opened around 1865. At some time, it split into South Brisbane Boys State School and South Brisbane Girls and Infants State School. In 1929, the Boys School and the Girls and Infants were amalgamated to form two new schools, South Brisbane State School for Preparatory to Grade 5 and South Brisbane Intermediate State School for Grades 6 and 7. In 1953 the Intermediate School was amalgamated into South Brisbane State School. The school closed in 1963.

South Brisbane Wesleyan Methodist Church opened in July 1866.

The South Brisbane Congregational Church was officially opened in Grey Street on 13 January 1867. The congregation was originally established at the Mechanics Institute in Stanley Street on 9 July 1865 and this was their first church building. It was made of timber. It was badly damaged in the 1893 Brisbane floods and subsequently demolished as the congregation decided to abandon this low-lying site.

In 1874, John Cani established St Kilian's College in Raymond Terrace at the site now occupied by St Laurence's College. On Tuesday 20 December 1904 it was partially demolished in a severe storm and its buildings were sold for removal.

In October 1875, the congregation of St Thomas' Anglican Church decided to erect a new church in a more "central" location, apparently desiring a more elevated site and a more "pretentious" church. In November 1877 a building site was obtained on the corner of Vulture Street and Cordelia Street (27.4816°S 153.0193°E). In June 1878 the church officials selected Andrea Strombuco's design for the new church. The foundation stone for the new St Andrew's Anglican Church was laid on Saturday 30 November 1878 by Queensland Governor Arthur Kennedy. After delays in construction due to insufficient money, the new church was officially opened and dedicated on Wednesday 6 June 1883 by Bishop Matthew Hale assisted by Archdeacon Benjamin Glennie with over 500 people present. St Thomas' church then closed.

In 1884, the railway to the south was opened with a terminus at South Brisbane. As a result, South Brisbane experienced a construction boom. In 1888, South Brisbane became an independent municipality, initially as the Borough of South Brisbane and then becoming the City of South Brisbane in 1903. In 1925 the City of South Brisbane was amalgamated into the City of Greater Brisbane.

The South Brisbane Reach portion of the Brisbane River was once the city's main port, located along riverfront underneath today's Captain Cook Bridge. Depots and wharves were gradually closed over the following century, culminating in the area's transformation for Expo 88. The South Brisbane Dry Dock was opened in 1881, now the Queensland Maritime Museum.

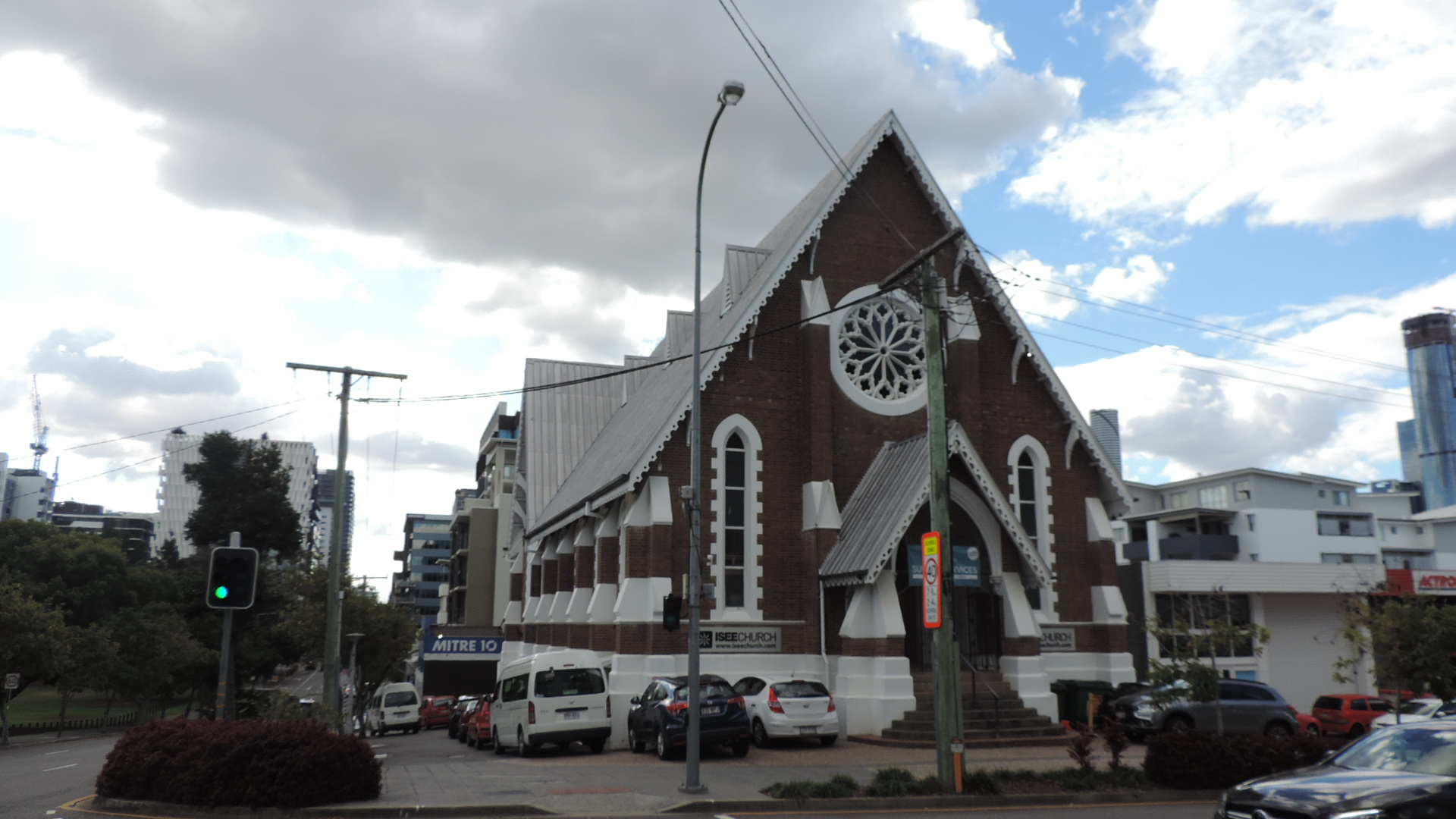
Former Park Presbyterian Church (now the iSEE church), 2020

By the 1880s, the Presbyterian church in Grey Street had grown too small for its congregation. In October 1884 a foundation stone for a new church was laid. On 11 October 1885 the new Park Presbyterian Church was opened at 31 Glenelg Street on the corner of Cordelia Street (27.4787°S 153.0179°E) by Robert Steel, senior member of the Presbyterian Church in Sydney. The name Park reflects the location of the church directly opposite Musgrave Park. It was designed by architect FDG Stanley and could accommodate 550 seated in the church and 300 seated in the Sunday school in the basement. Over time the area became increasingly used for industrial and commercial purposes and families moved away to more residential areas. The congregation sold the church in early 1950 in order to build a new Park Presbyterian Church in the more residential location of 21 Hampstead Road, Highgate Hill. The church at Glenelg Street was used by the Plymouth Brethren Christian Church for some years, then for commercial purposes, and as at 2020 by the iSee Church (Pentecostal).

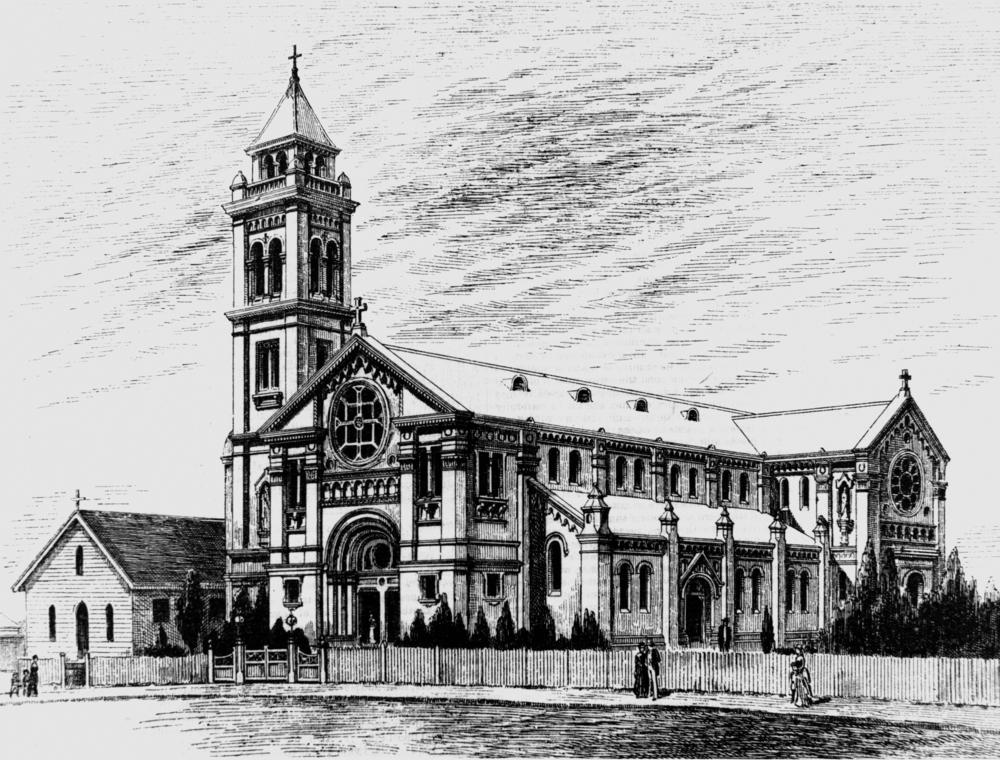
1893 sketch from Peel Street of the first St Mary's Church (left, now demolished) and the proposed second St Mary's Church (never fully completed)

Similarly St Mary's Catholic Church became too small for its congregation. From 1884 to 1889 the Catholic Church had acquired more land adjoining St Mary's Catholic, eventually owning all of the northern end of the block bounded by Cordelia, Peel and Merivale Streets, enabling it to raise funds for a new St Mary's church in 1890. Architects George Simkin and John Ibler prepared designs for a cruciform church with Italianate and Romanesque Revival features able to seat 800 people. The foundation stone was laid by Cardinal Patrick Francis Moran on 25 September 1892. When the second St Mary's Church (27.4737°S 153.0151°E) was blessed and opened by Archbishop Robert Dunne on 2 July 1893, St Mary's had already cost £2,150 to build and it had been decided to defer the construction of the tower, transepts and chancel to a later time, but they were never built. However, in 1929 a sanctuary (including vestry and sacristy) designed by architects Cavanagh and Cavanagh was added to the eastern side of the church. The Sisters of Mercy opened a new St Mary's School in 1909. The school closed in 1964.

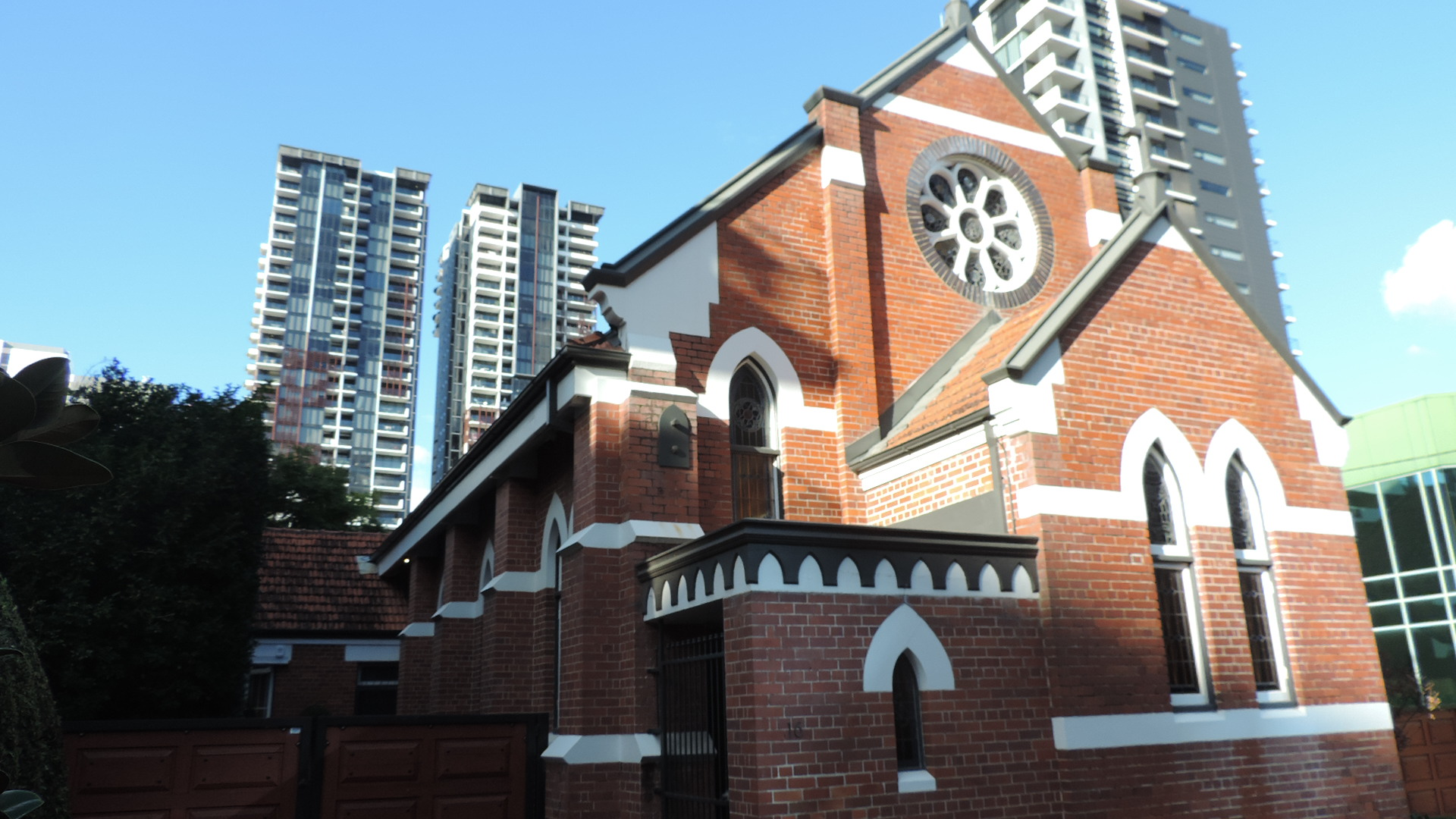
Catholic Apostolic Church (built 1917), later the third St Thomas' Anglican Church, 2020

In June 1888 the first Catholic Apostolic Church in Queensland was opened at 16 Manning Street (27.4750°S 153.0141°E). Designed by architect Leslie Corrie, the church interior was 55 by 25 feet (16.8 by 7.6 m) with one third of its length used for the chancel. The building was designed with the expectation of enlarging it at a later stage. The church was burned down on Saturday 21 July 1917. In October 1917 architect George Addison called for tenders to construct a new brick church on the site. Their minister Joseph Todd Young died on 22 February 1932 and the church continued to operate under its deacons until the death of the last deacon in 1957. In 1962 the church building was bought by the Anglican Church.

South Brisbane was badly affected by the flood of the Brisbane River in February 1893. It is estimated that 350 hectares (860 acres) were inundated in South Brisbane. The water rose up to 4.8 metres (16 ft) and only the tops of some roofs remained visible. Stanley Street, then the main thoroughfare, was described as "one long stretch of ruin and desolation".

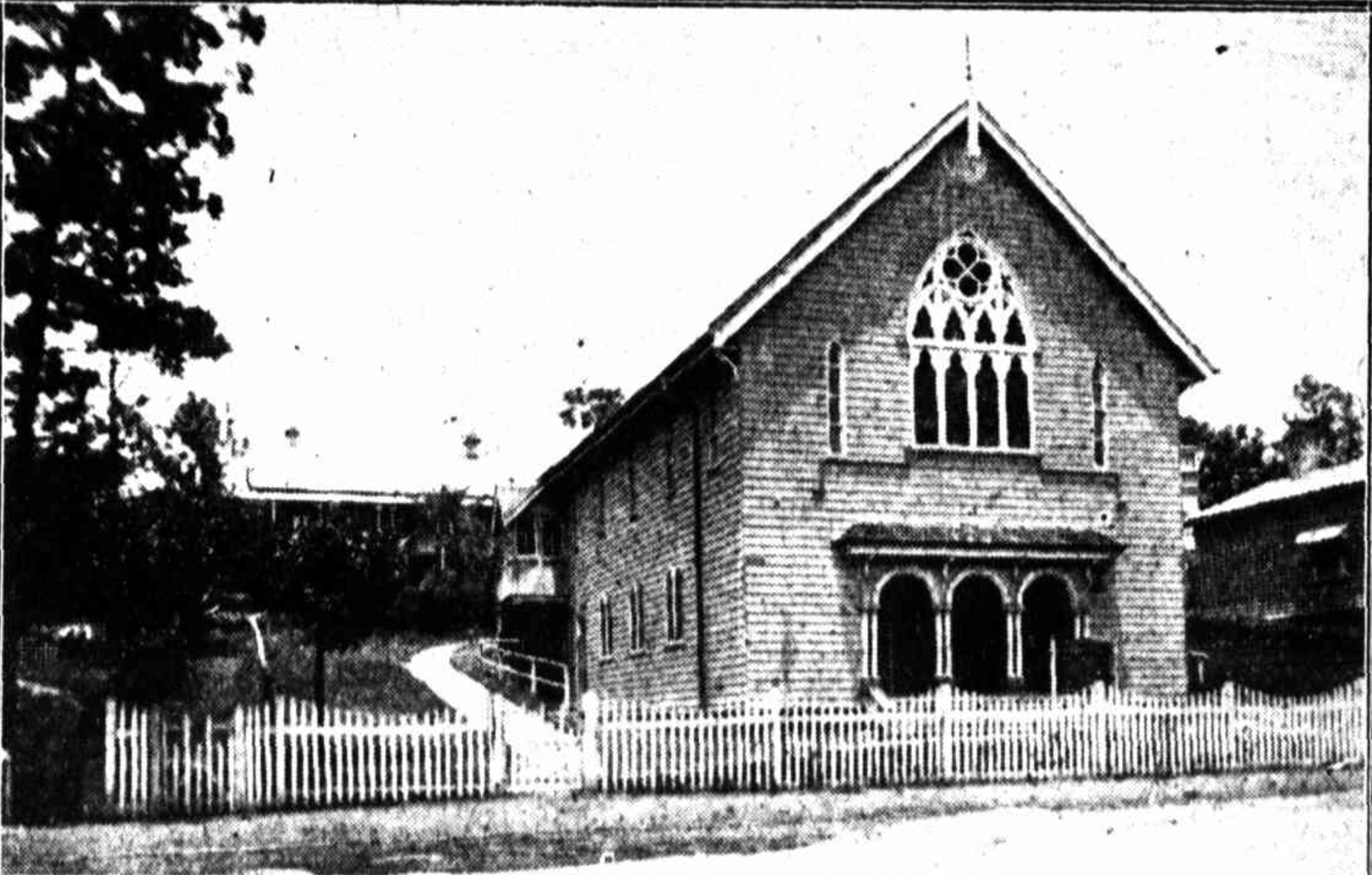
South Brisbane Congregational Church in Vulture Street, 1893

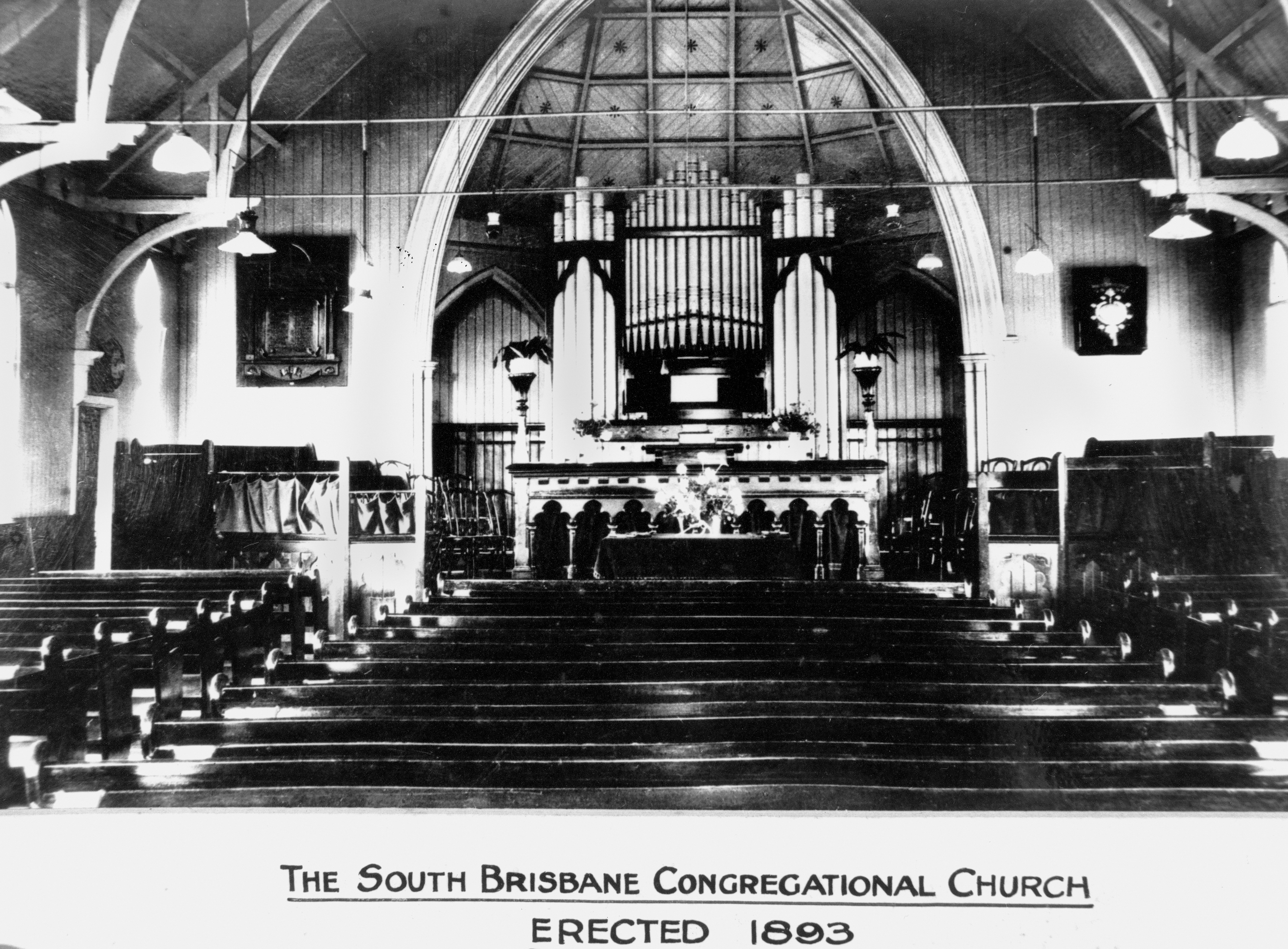
Interior of the 1893 South Brisbane Congregational Church

As the Congregational Church in Grey Street (built in 1863) had been severely damaged in the February 1893 Brisbane flood, the decision was made to relocate to a higher location at 245 Vulture Street (27.4827°S 153.0223°E). The Grey Street church was dismantled and the building materials re-used in constructing the new Vulture Street church. On Sunday 23 July 1893 the Vulture Street church was opened. On 16 October 1931 the Vulture Street church was destroyed in a fire, but the hall was spared and the congregation used it for worship until a new church was constructed in 1933.

The first electric tramway in Brisbane ran along Stanley Street in South Brisbane on 16 June 1897.

=== 20th century ===
In 1919, the Brisbane High School for Girls (now Somerville House) was relocated to the property Cumbooqueepa in Vulture Street in South Brisbane (27.4832°S 153.0246°E), adjacent to the South Brisbane Town Hall (which since 15 June 1999 forms part of the school). The school was opened on 6 October 1899 by Eliza Fewings in the basement of the Baptist City Tabernacle at 183 Wickham Terrace, relocating to Erneton (also in Wickham Terrace( in 1912. The school was purchased by the Presbyterian and Methodist Schools Association in 1918.

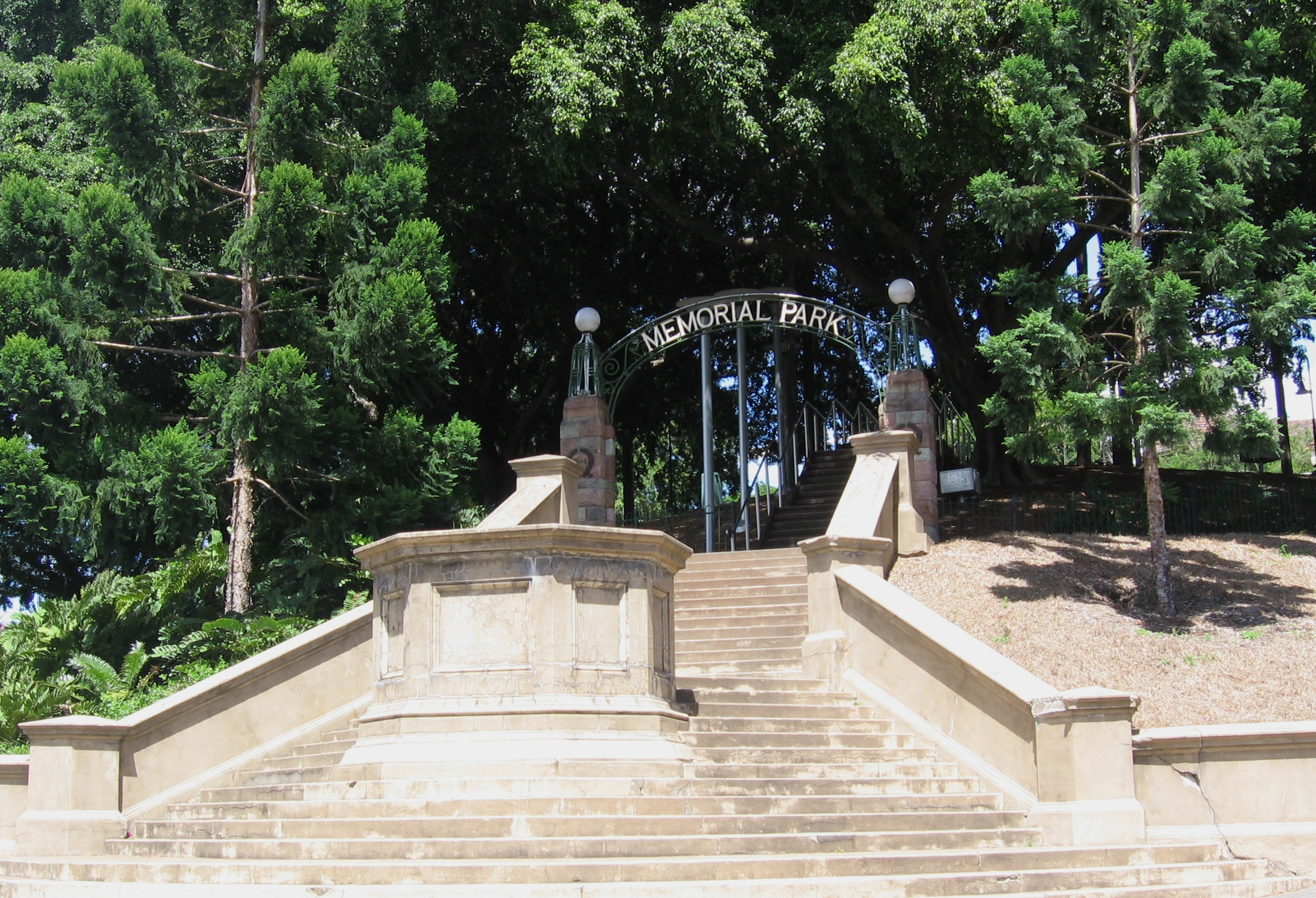
South Brisbane Memorial Park, 2010

St Laurence's College for boys was officially opened and blessed on Sunday 11 July 1915 by the Roman Catholic Archbishop of Brisbane James Duhig. The school was operated by the Christian Brothers.

The South Brisbane Memorial Park commemorates those of South Brisbane who died in World War I. On 20 May 1921 the South Brisbane City Council set aside a triangular block land bounded by Stanley Street, Vulture Street and Sidon Street (27.4826°S 153.0253°E) opposite the South Brisbane Town Hall. On 6 August 1923 the park was dedicated by the Governor-General of Australia, Henry Forster.

In 1925, Brisbane State High School moved to its current site at Vulture Street, South Brisbane, a location which had been proposed as a site for a public grammar school back in 1867. The school was originally established on 1 July 1921 at the old Brisbane Normal School building on the corner of Adelaide and Edward Streets in the Brisbane CBD) as an amalgamation of the High School Department of the Brisbane Central Technical College and Brisbane Junior State High School. The first students were admitted on 4 July 1921.

On 10 May 1931, a second St Thomas' Anglican Church was established at 68 Grey Street (approx 27.4733°S 153.0181°E) to the immediate north of Fish Lane (which then extended through to Stanley Street), very close to the site of the first St Thomas' church. It was under the control of St Andrew's Anglican Church. It was built from white stucco. It was to serve as a mission church in a largely industrial area with many wharves. It is unclear when this church closed (presumably before the third St Thomas's Anglican Church opened in 1962) and this church building no longer exists.

Following the destruction of the timber Congregation Church in Vulture Street in the 1931 fire, the congregation decided to build a new brick church and commissioned prominent Brisbane architect Brenan Gargett who proposed an unusual octagonal structure. The congregation faced a difficult time in funding a new church during the Great Depression. The new church was opened on Saturday 9 September 1933 by Reverend S. Roberts, the President of the Queensland Congregational Union. The octagon building was 35 feet (11 m) between its sides and could seat 142 people in the main area with a further 40 in the choir, with a stair to an upper gallery seating 58 people. Demographic changes in South Brisbane after World War II saw the congregation move away from South Brisbane to be replaced by European and Asian immigrant communities, who were not Congregationalists. The remaining congregation decided to join the Mount Gravatt Congregational Church, holding their last service in the Vulture Street Church in December 1975.

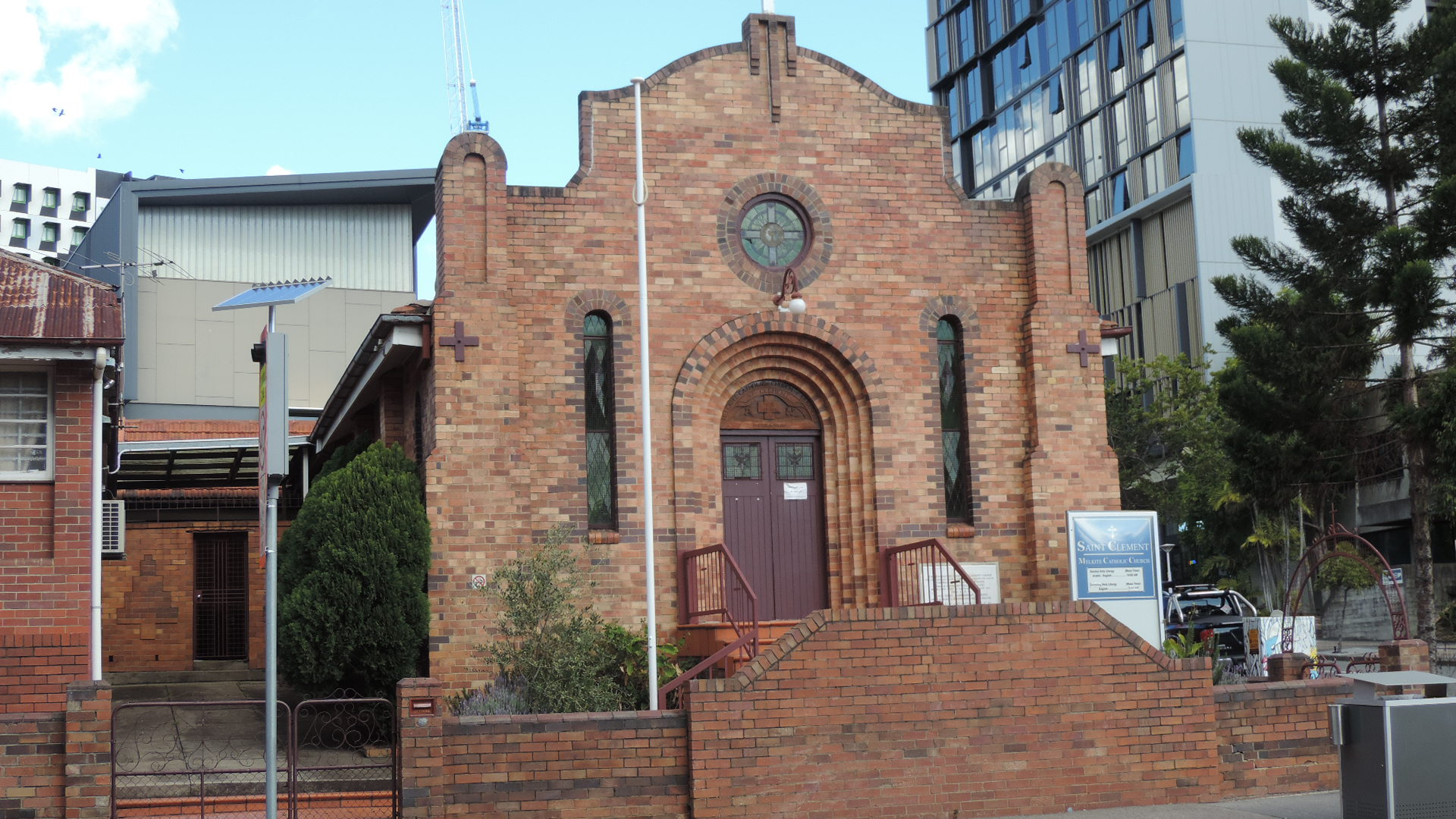
St Clement's Melkite Catholic Church, 2020

Brisbane's Melkite Catholic community initially worshipped at St Mary's Roman Catholic Church in South Brisbane. In 1929 the community had purchased land at 72 Ernest Street (27.4802°S 153.0203°E) and a foundation stone was laid by Roman Catholic Archbishop James Duhig and Lebanese Bishop Clement Malouf on Sunday 24 March 1929. The ceremony was to be performed on previous Sunday 17 March 1929 but rain forced it to be postponed, but the foundation stone was already inscribed with the earlier date. However, raising funds to build the church was difficult during the Great Depression and it was not until 29 March 1936 that St Clement's Melkite Catholic Church was officially opened by Archbishop Duhig.

South Brisbane gained a seedy reputation with many pubs, brothels and boarding houses among warehouses with few homes. During World War II when there was a large American military presence in Brisbane, the desire to separate the white and black American troops (segregation being the norm in some parts of the United States at that time) saw South Brisbane unofficially declared the city's 'black' area, leaving the white troops to enjoy the better parts of the city.

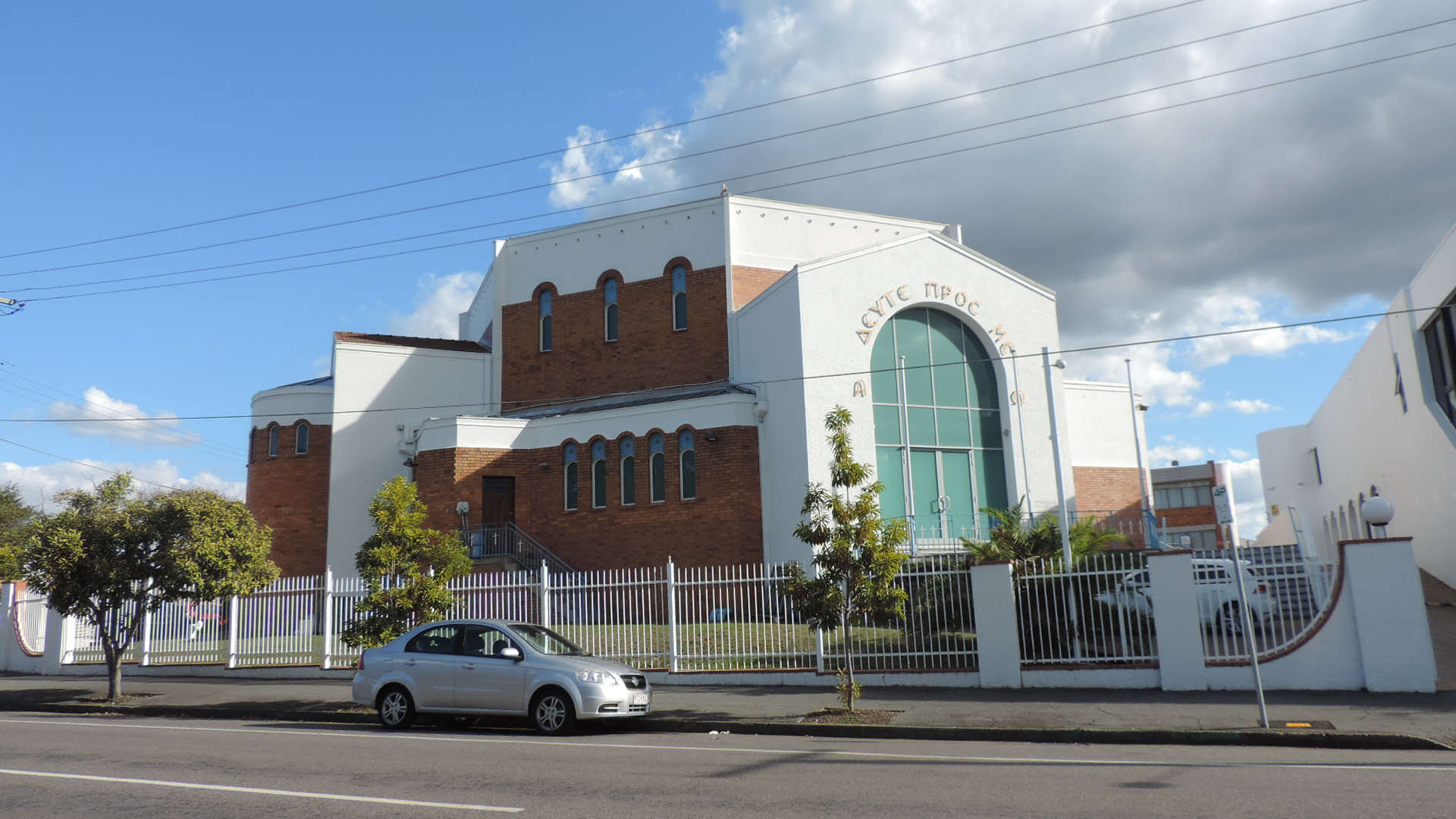
St George's Greek Orthodox Church, 2020

The Greek Association of Brisbane was established in 1913. In May 1921 it established a community centre in Charlotte Street in the Brisbane central business district, followed by St George's Greek Orthodox Church on the same site in 1929. However, the growth in Brisbane's Greek population, particularly after World War II, resulted in a need for a larger church. A new St George's Greek Orthodox Church was built at 33 Edmondstone Street (corner Besant Street) in South Brisbane. The foundation stone was laid on 4 May 1958 by Archbishop Theophylactos. The finished church was opened and dedicated on 24 April 1960 by Archbishop Ezekiel. The architect was Ronald Martin Wilson. The church is octagonal with an octagonal dome and is richly decorated internally in the Greek Orthodox tradition. A new Greek community centre (now known as The Greek Club) was built beside the church at 37 Edmondstone Street (27.4796°S 153.0153°E), opening in 1976.

In 1962, the Anglican Church established their third St Thomas' Church at 16 Manning Street (27.4750°S 153.0142°E) to replace the second St Thomas's Church of England in Grey Street by purchasing the Catholic Apostolic Church. The Anglican Church ceased to use Manning Street Church in 1979 and sold it in 1984 and, although the 1920s church building still exists, it is no longer used for religion purposes and has been used as commercial premises and as a private home. The name Callan House is displayed on the front of the building.

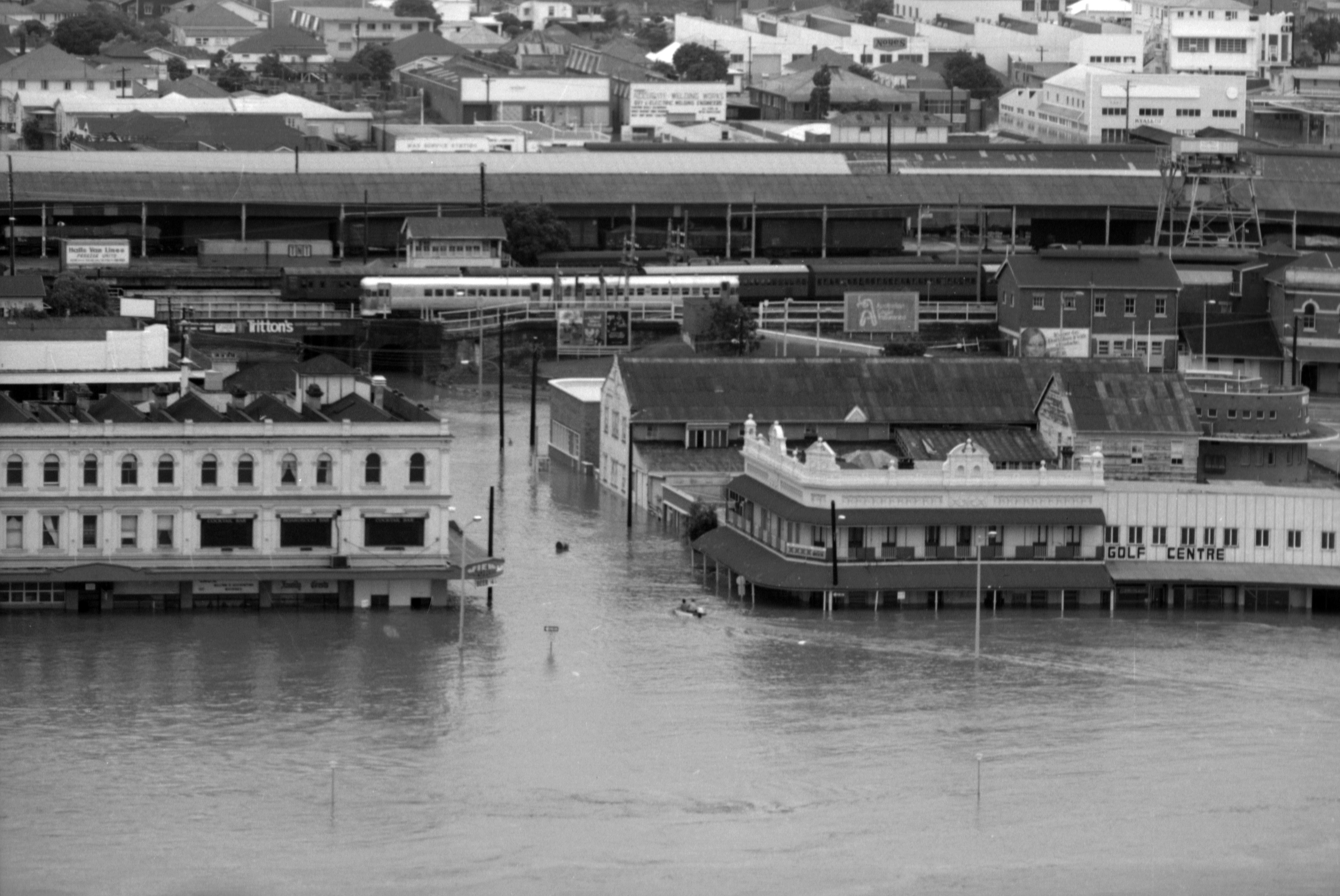
1974 flood in South Brisbane

The suburb became heavily industrialised. Being adjacent to the Brisbane River, the suburb and its industries suffered in the 1974 Brisbane flood.

In 1977, the former Congregational church in Vulture Street was sold to the Serbian Orthodox Church, who added two cupolas to the building and opened it as Saint Nicholas Free Serbian Orthodox Church. The building is now listed on the Brisbane Heritage Register.

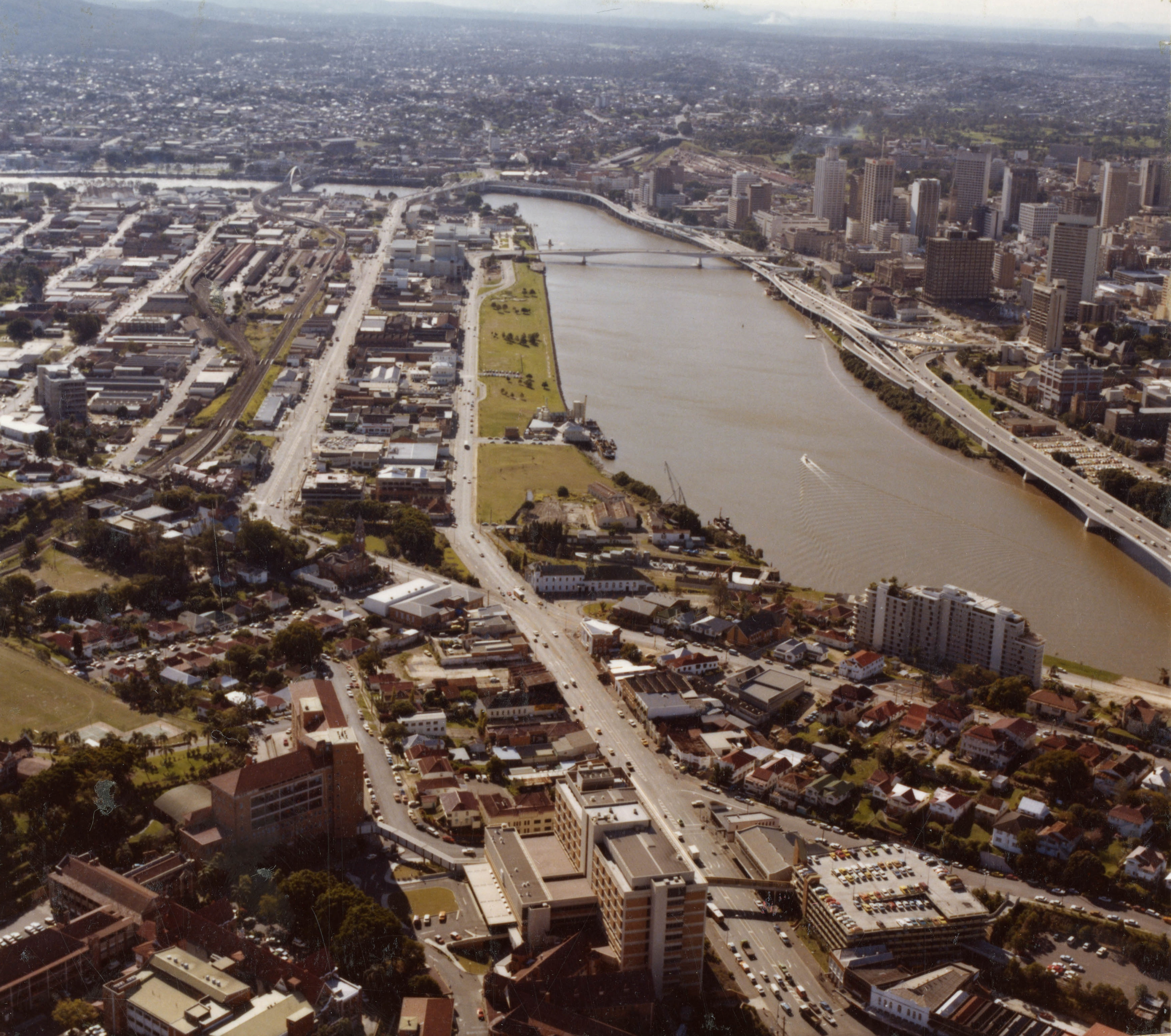
South Brisbane, 1983

Mater Hospital Special School opened on 3 January 1981. On 1 December 2014, it was renamed the Lady Cilento Children's Hospital School. On 1 January 2019, it was renamed Queensland Children's Hospital School.

On 20 April 1985, the Queensland Performing Arts Centre was opened in South Brisbane by Prince Edward, Duke of Kent.

The Museum of Contemporary Art (MOCA), incorporating the Young Artists Gallery, was a private gallery that existed from 1987 to 1994. Situated in adjacent buildings in South Brisbane, MOCA's address was 164 Melbourne Street, while Young Artists Gallery's entrance was at 23 Manning Street.

South Brisbane's regeneration began when it was selected as the location of World Expo '88, which was built on former wharves along the riverside and the adjacent industrial land. Following Expo '88, South Bank Parklands was built on the former Expo site. South Brisbane has emerged as fashionable, high density, modern residential area, given its proximity to the city centre and good public transport links.

== Demographics ==
In the 2011 census, South Brisbane had a population of 5,416 people, 48.8% female and 51.2% male. The median age of the South Brisbane population was 30 years, seven years below the Australian median. One-third of the population (33.3%) were aged in their twenties, compared to 13.8% nationally. 44.2% of people living in South Brisbane were born in Australia, compared to the national average of 69.8%. The other top responses for country of birth were England 3.8%, New Zealand 3.7%, China 3.3%, Korea, Republic of 3%, India 2%. 57.2% of people spoke only English at home; the next most popular languages were 5.5% Mandarin, 2.8% Korean, 2.7% Cantonese, 2.1% Greek, 1.9% Arabic. The most common religious affiliation was "No Religion" (30%); the next most common responses were Catholic (19%), Anglican (8.5%), Buddhism (4.6%) and Islam (3.8%).

In the 2016 census, South Brisbane had a population of 7,196 people.

In the 2021 census, South Brisbane had a population of 14,292 people.

== Heritage listings ==
Being one of the older parts of Brisbane and an area of greater cultural heritage, South Brisbane has many heritage-listed buildings.

== Education ==
There are no government primary schools in South Brisbane. The nearest government primary schools are West End State School in neighbouring West End to the west and Dutton Park State School in neighbouring Dutton Park to the south.

Somerville House is a private primary and secondary (Prep–12) school for girls at 17 Graham Street (27.4836°S 153.0254°E). In 2018, the school had an enrolment of 1317 students with 125 teachers (117 full-time equivalent) and 102 non-teaching staff (90 full-time equivalent).

Queensland Children's Hospital School (formerly known as Lady Cilento Children's Hospital School) is a specific-purpose primary and secondary (Prep–12) school with headquarters on Raymond Terrace (27.4844°S 153.0272°E). It provides schooling to children being treated in the Queensland Children's Hospital (formerly known as Lady Cilento Children's Hospital School) and also for other children in the family whose schooling has been disrupted by the hospitalisation and to assist in their transition to/from their regular school. It operates across a number of campuses in Brisbane and provides support to regional hospitals. In 2019, the school had an enrolment of 3,567 students across all of its campuses with 42 teachers (34 full-time equivalent) and 24 non-teaching staff (15 full-time equivalent).

St Laurence's College is a Catholic primary and secondary (5–12) school for boys at 82 Stephens Road (27.4859°S 153.0240°E). In 2018, the school had an enrolment of 1890 students with 149 teachers (144 full-time equivalent) and 91 non-teaching staff (75 full-time equivalent).

Brisbane State High School is a government secondary (7–12) school for boys and girls at the corner of Cordelia and Glenelg Streets (27.4817°S 153.0180°E). In 2018, the school had an enrolment of 3,156 students with 207 teachers (200 full-time equivalent) and 74 non-teaching staff (60 full-time equivalent). It includes a special education program.

South Brisbane is also served by the new Brisbane South State Secondary College, a government secondary (7–12) school for boys and girls in neighbouring Dutton Park to the south. The 2021 initial intake was Year 7 students only, with each successive calendar year extending the range of school years on offer until 2026 when the full Years 7–12 schooling will be provided.

There are two tertiary institutions in South Brisbane:

- Griffith University (Southbank Campus)
- Southbank Institute of Technology

== Amenities ==
St George's Greek Orthodox Church is at 33 Edmonstone Street (27.4799°S 153.0156°E). Its feast days are 23 April and 3 November.

== South Bank ==
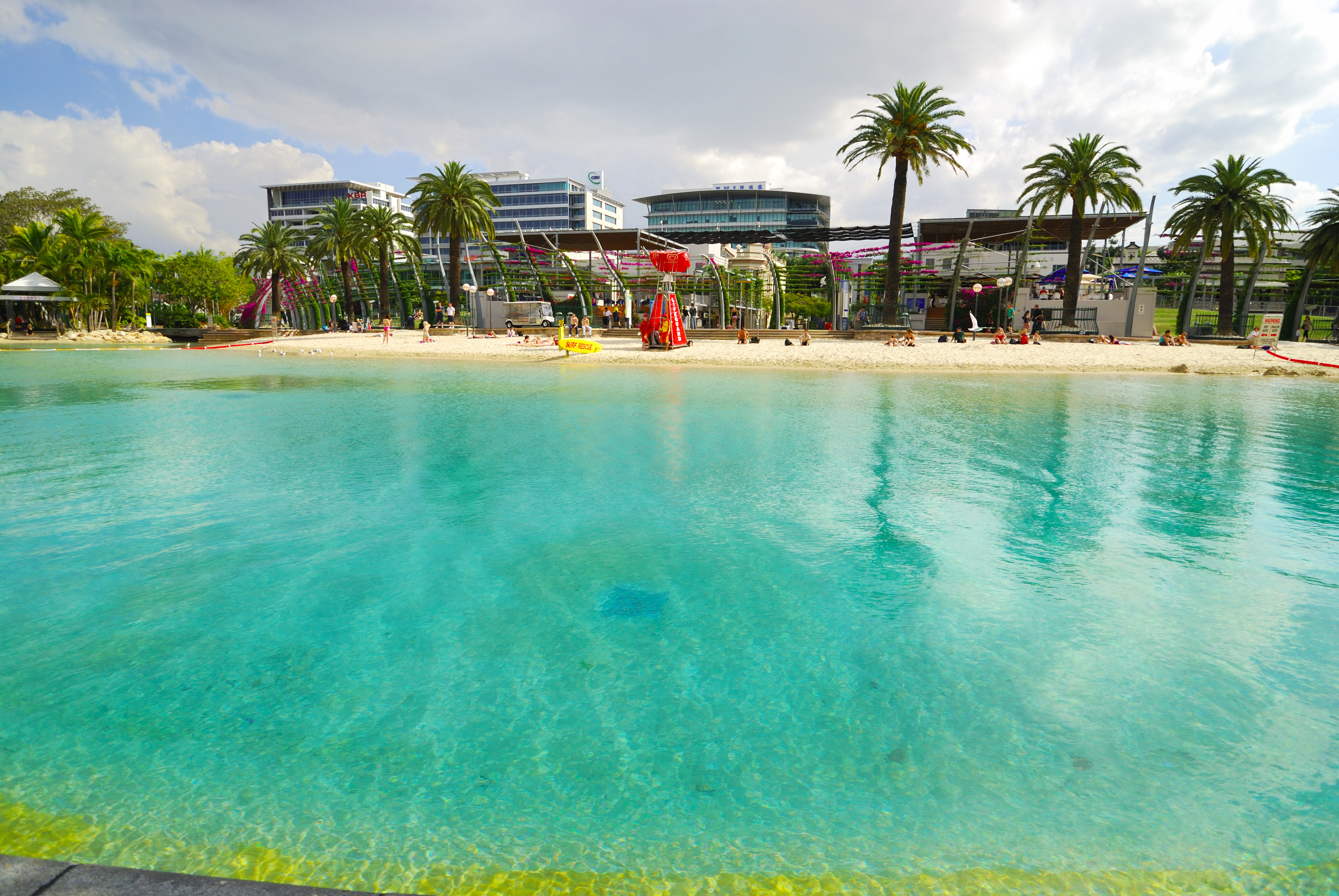
Streets Beach in the South Bank Parklands.

The South Bank precinct in South Brisbane contains many notable attractions.

=== South Bank Parklands ===
The South Bank Parklands are one of Brisbane's most popular tourist attractions. The parklands are home to many restaurants and café's as well as landmarks such as the Queensland Conservatorium (27.4765°S 153.0206°E), the Wheel of Brisbane (27.4752°S 153.0208°E), the Nepalese Peace Pagoda (27.4754°S 153.0213°E), Streets Beach (27.4782°S 153.0233°E), and the Grand Arbour. Approximately 11,000,000 people visit the South Bank Parklands each year.

=== Grey Street and Little Stanley Street ===
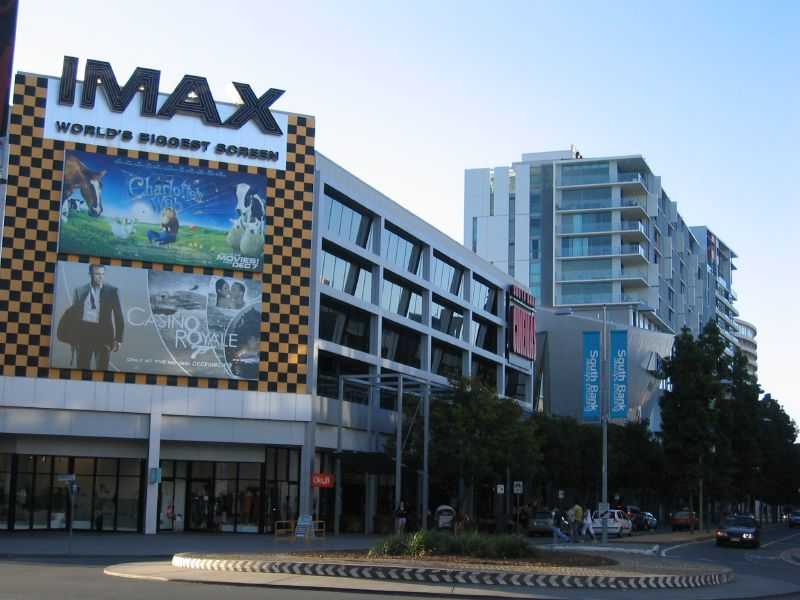
South Bank Cinemas on Grey Street.

A number of Brisbane's most popular restaurants and fashion boutiques are located on Grey Street, and Little Stanley Street which it runs parallel to. The South Bank Cinemas are also located on Grey Street, along with two five star hotels.

=== Brisbane Convention & Exhibition Centre ===
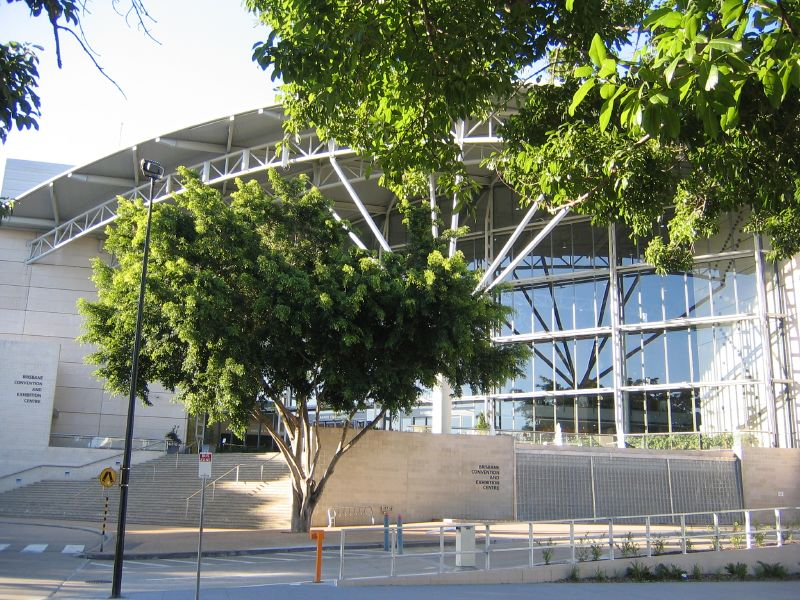
Entrance to the Brisbane Convention & Exhibition Centre

The Brisbane Convention & Exhibition Centre contains 24 meeting and event spaces including four exhibition halls with a combined area of 20,000m² and an auditorium capable of seating 8,000. The venue has received 107 industry awards, making it the most awarded convention centre in Australia. The centre has been named the World's Best Convention Centre on three occasions (2016, 2017, 2018) by the Association Internationale des Palais de Congres (AIPC).

=== Queensland Maritime Museum ===
The Queensland Maritime Museum is located next to the Goodwill Bridge at the southern end of the South Bank Parklands (27.4818°S 153.0257°E). It is based around the former South Brisbane Dry Dock.

=== Queensland Cultural Centre ===
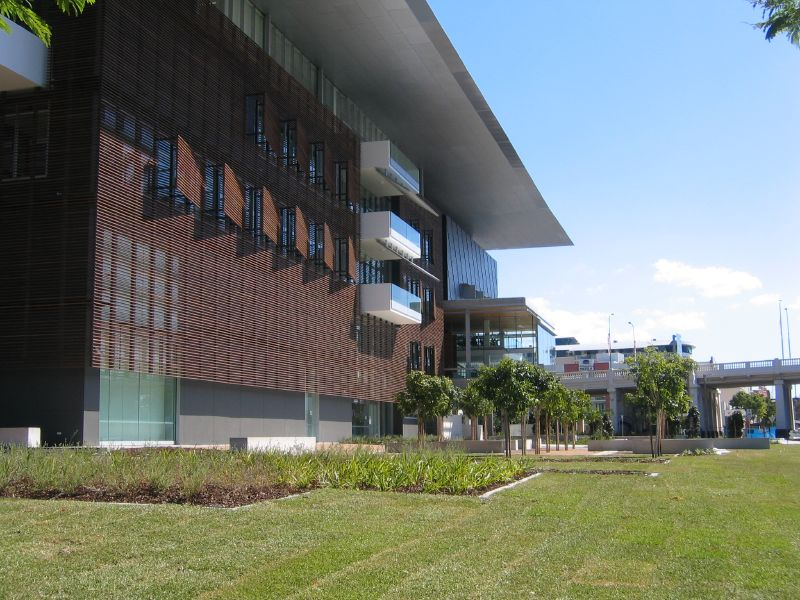
Exterior of the Queensland Gallery of Modern Art.

The Queensland Cultural Centre consists of:

- the Queensland Performing Arts Centre
- the Queensland Museum and Science Centre
- the Queensland Art Gallery
- the Queensland Gallery of Modern Art
- the State Library of Queensland (including The Edge, a makerspace)

=== Griffith University ===
The South Bank campus of Griffith University includes:

- the Queensland Conservatorium
- the Queensland College of Art
- the Griffith Film School

=== TAFE Queensland Brisbane ===
TAFE Queensland Brisbane has a campus at South Bank which spreads over several blocks between the railway line and Merivale Street.. It was formerly known as the Southbank Institute of Technology.

== Business ==
Mater Health Services was founded in 1906 with the opening of a hospital

Mater Health Services provides a wide range of public and private medical services in the area to the south of the suburb around Mater Hill and close to its border with Woolloongabba.

== Events ==
The annual Paniyiri Festival has been held at Musgrave Park since 1976. The festival provides an opportunity for the Greek community to share its culture with the rest of Australia. It is Queensland's longest running cultural festival and the longest running Greek festival in Australia.

The Fair Day of the annual Brisbane Pride Festival is held in Musgrave Park.

== See also ==
- List of Brisbane suburbs
