= Vulture Street =

Vulture Street may refer to:

- Vulture Street, Brisbane, a street in Queensland, Australia
- Vulture Street (album), a music album by the group Powderfinger
