= St Paul's Anglican Church, East Brisbane =

St Paul's Anglican Church
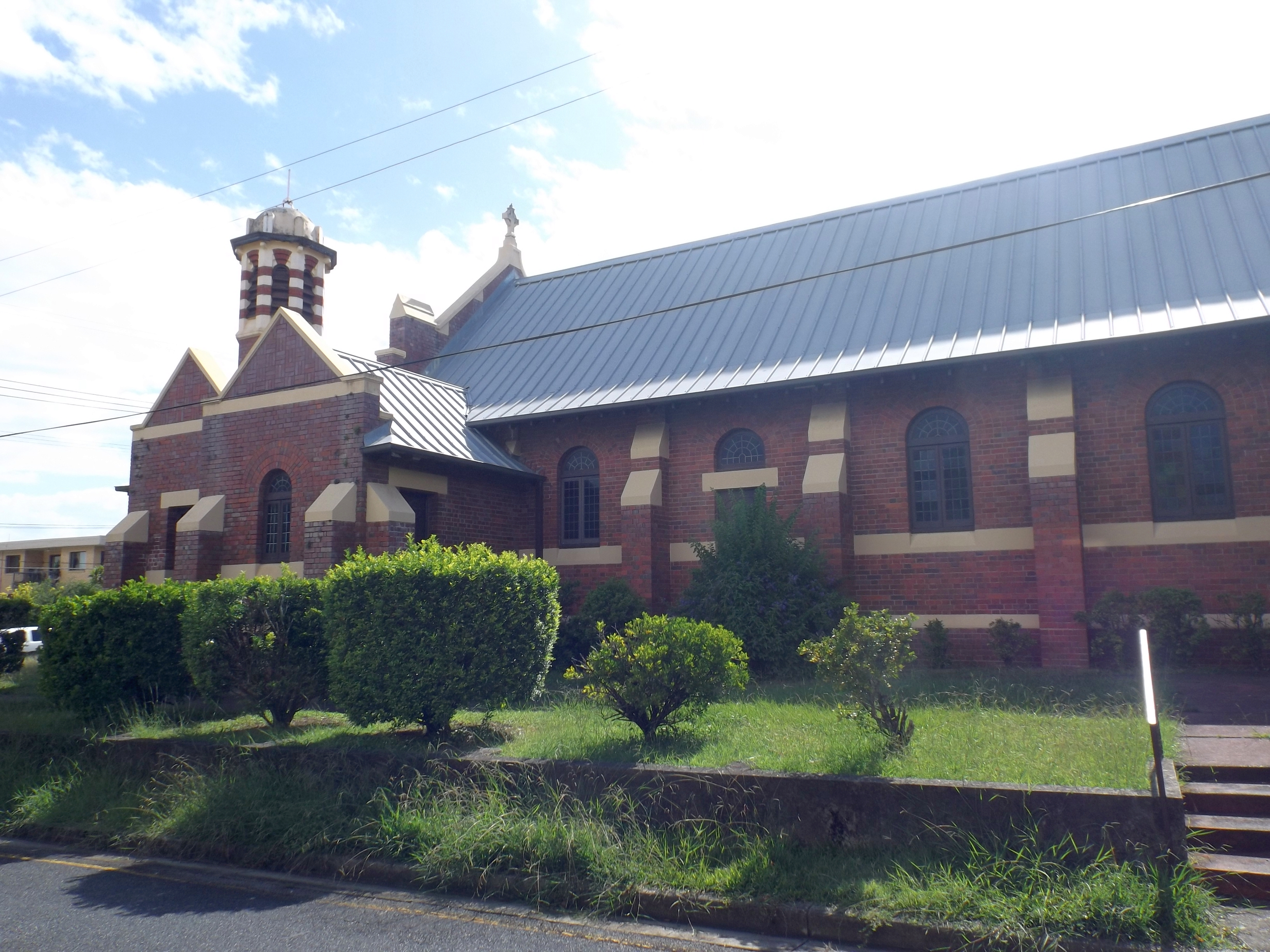
- View from Balmoral Terrace, 2015
- St Paul's Anglican Church
- 27°29′08″S 153°02′41″E
- Address: 554 Vulture Street East, East Brisbane, City of Brisbane, Queensland
- Country: Australia
- Denomination: Anglican Church of Australia
- Website: stpaulseastbrisbane.org.au

History
- Status: Church
- Founded: 23 March 1924
- Founder: Archbishop Gerald Sharp
- Dedication: Saint Paul
- Dedicated: 21 September 1924 by Archbishop Gerald Sharp

Architecture
- Functional status: Active
- Architect: Atkinson & Conrad
- Architectural type: Church
- Style: Romanesque Revival; Gothic Revival; Arts and Crafts
- Completed: 1924

Administration
- Diocese: Brisbane
- Parish: St Paul's, East Brisbane

Queensland Heritage Register
- Official name: St Paul's Anglican Church and Columbarium
- Type: state heritage (built)
- Designated: 7 February 2014
- Reference no.: 602826
- Significant period: 1920s
- Significant components: lychgate, wall/s – retaining, columbarium, church
- Builders: J Hood

St Paul's Anglican Church is a heritage-listed Anglican church and columbarium at 554 Vulture Street East, East Brisbane, City of Brisbane, Queensland, Australia. It was designed by Atkinson & Conrad and built in 1924 by J Hood. It was added to the Queensland Heritage Register on 7 February 2014.

== History ==
St Paul's, an Anglican brick church on Vulture Street in East Brisbane, was built in 1924 and designed by Brisbane Diocesan architects, Atkinson and Conrad. The church dates from a pronounced period of expansion for the Anglican Church in Queensland, when many new ecclesiastical buildings were constructed, especially in the Brisbane Diocese.

Much of the area comprising what is now East Brisbane, traditional country of the Yuggera and Turrbal people, was purchased from the Crown in 1855 by Joseph Darragh. It was the eventual subdivision of this property, and other large estates into allotments in the mid-1880s which established East Brisbane as a residential suburb. Prior to this, it was semi-rural in character, with a few isolated families scattered through the area, and a number of elite estates along the river. The electric tramway reached Woolloongabba/East Brisbane in 1897, and in 1901 an extension through East Brisbane to Norman Park was constructed. The provision of this cheap, efficient form of public transport encouraged further settlement in the East Brisbane area. From the 1910s to the 1930s, it grew gradually.

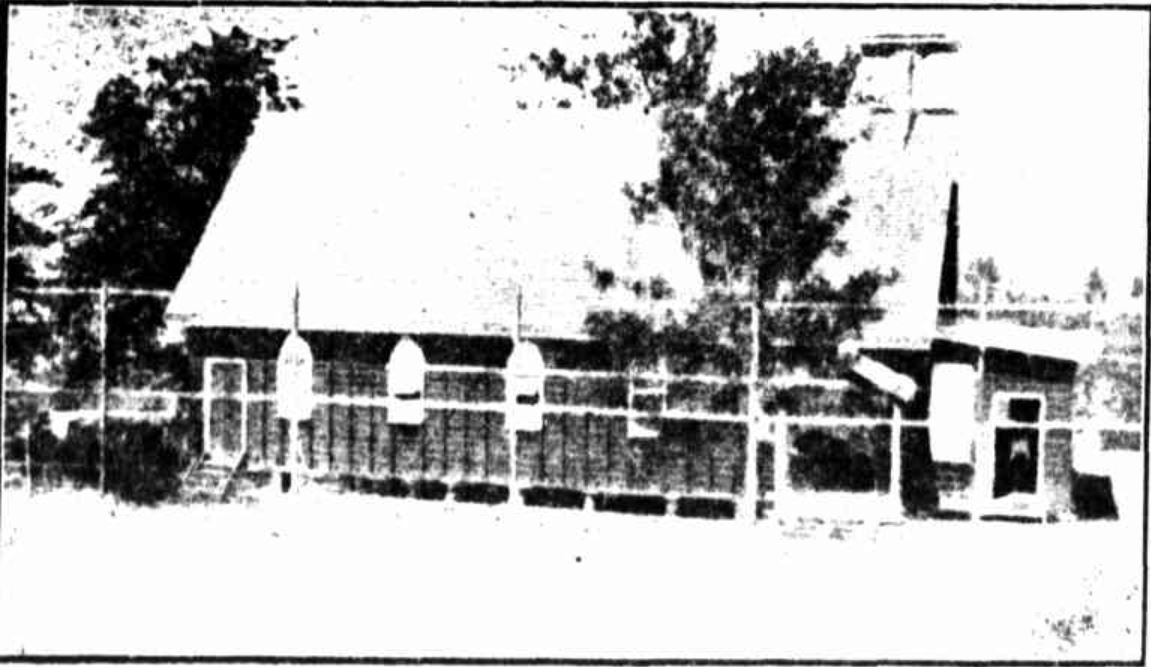
First St Paul's Church of England, 1924

Anglican church services commenced in East Brisbane in 1887, when a curate from St Mary's, Kangaroo Point, began conducting services in a building owned by Charles Ewbank called "The Grange" (now 17 Didsbury Street) from 14 January 1887. A site was acquired on the corner of Vulture and Edgar Streets (559 Vulture Street East, 27.4867°S 153.0490°E), where a timber church, also initially used for Sunday School, was opened 1 December 1887. From 1889 St Paul's was serviced by priests from Holy Trinity parish at Woolloongabba before returning to St Mary's parish in 1895. St Paul's was then serviced by the Church Mission until 1921, when it was raised to "parochial district" status.

In 1912 the priest attached to St Paul's, Morgan Baker, and the church community began working towards the establishment of a new church. By Easter 1914 a building fund had raised over £400. Fundraising continued through the 1910s but was disrupted by World War I.

The election of Gerald Sharp as Archbishop of the Diocese of Brisbane in 1921 heralded an important expansion phase for the Anglican Church in Queensland. Over the next ten years 57 new churches were built in the Brisbane Diocese and over 30,000 new members were received into communion. Timber (considered temporary) churches were mainly built in new parishes, while many brick (permanent) churches replaced earlier structures at older parishes. Large-scale building projects also occurred at church schools, including the Anglican Church Grammar School (Churchie) at East Brisbane, during this period.

By 1922, renewed activity under Reverend George Neal saw a committee established to build the new church. A large meeting chaired by Archbishop Sharp was held in July to consider whether a new church should be built in timber or brick. The committee emphasised the need to act as soon as possible, as the present building was inadequate for its needs. The vote for a brick church was "practically unanimous". St Paul's attained the status of parish in 1923 and in June 1923 the Corporation of the Synod of the Diocese of Brisbane formally acquired a new site for St Paul's on the corner of Vulture Street and Balmoral Terrace. The elevated site, "nearer the tramline and in a more conspicuous position", was consciously chosen to enhance the prominence of the church within the suburb. At a fundraising event in November, Canon Francis de Witt Batty commended the decision to bring St Paul's Church out of "comparative obscurity into the light of day", while also noting "Brisbane had awakened at last to its duty in the matter of church building".

In January 1924 diocesan architects, Atkinson and Conrad, produced a design for the new church at East Brisbane. The firm, (operating in 2013 as Conrad Gargett Riddel) began in 1890 as the practice of Henry Atkinson (1866–1938) who had previously worked as an architect in the Queensland Public Works department. Charles McLay, a former colleague, was admitted into the practice in 1907. McLay was appointed Diocesan Architect in 1916 following the resignation of Robin Dods. The position of Diocesan Architect was passed to Atkinson in 1918 following the death of McLay. Arnold Conrad, who had worked for Atkinson and McLay since 1912 was appointed partner and the firm was renamed Atkinson and Conrad Architects. In 1922 Atkinson travelled to Europe to study church architecture. The firm (from 1938 as Conrad and Gargett), continued to provide church and school designs for the diocese over the next fifty years. Other buildings designed by Atkinson and Conrad and entered in the Queensland Heritage Register are Craigston (1928 apartment building) and the Balmoral Fire Station (1927).

The new St Paul's church was designed as a nave with an extended semicircular-planned chancel attached to its east end, a side porch at its west end, side vestries for organ and choir, a belfry and attached buttress piers. White banding on facebrick (known as the "blood and bandage" style) featured both internally and externally. Up to 250 people could be accommodated within the church in addition to the choir. Provision was also made for a lych gate and rubble stone wall (at the time claimed to be the first for a church in Queensland). Lych gates, sheltered gateways at the entrance of a church ground, traditionally where clergy met corpses and conducted part of a funeral service, became increasingly popular elements of Australian Anglican church design during the interwar period, often dedicated as war memorials. The "Seek and ye shall find" inscription over the St Paul's gateway was carved by Reverend Neal.

The design by Atkinson and Conrad for St Paul's was an example of the type of modern ecclesiastic architecture that was widely used during the 1920s and 1930s. While such places incorporated traditional elements and symbology, designs were broadly characterised by a more simplified and freer approach than 19th century Gothic Revival examples, and featured less complicated ornamentation, large plain wall expanses and the "honest" use of materials. Brick was the preferred construction material, which (as "permanent" churches), allowed for consecration within the Anglican Church.

Atkinson and Conrad produced a similar but less detailed design for the Canon Jones Memorial Church in 1923 at the nearby Anglican Church Grammar School in East Brisbane (established in 1917). Other similar churches designed by Atkinson and Conrad for the Brisbane Diocese in the 1920s include those built in Sherwood, Wilston, and St Alban's Chapel at The Southport School.

In a 1929 presentation to the Church of England Men's Society, Arnold Conrad discussed a number of church design philosophies. "A church is a house of God", he stated, "...and all our efforts in church building should be directed to the greatest degree in assisting the worshippers to the right frame of mind. We should create the right spiritual emotion by surrounding the worshippers with beauty, and so lift men's minds that their souls may be brought into closer harmony with God".

Architectural elements outlined by Conrad to achieve this goal included: brick construction over timber, with bare treatments to interior walls; large windows at the rear of the church and side windows on the chancel (rather than behind the altar); low-toned cathedral glass in simple leaded design where stained glass was not affordable, naves that were long rather than wide, and internal roofing wholly of wood, with heavy timber for open trussed roofs, stained with a dull finish to create "an interesting and dignified treatment". Such elements are readily apparent at St Paul's and other churches of the 1920s designed by Atkinson and Conrad. In particular, the use of substantial timber roof trussing in the nave (a word derived from the Latin word navis for ship), resembling the interior of a ship's hull, expressed the longstanding symbolism of the church as a ship, guiding its members to safe harbour.

The tender of Red Hill builder J Hood, of just over £5000, was accepted for the erection of the church in late January 1924. Hood had recently completed St Matthew's Church in Sherwood. Reverend Neal and W Scott turned the first sod on 5 February, with the former laying the first brick on 14 February. The foundation stone was laid on 23 March by Archbishop Sharp and construction occurred over the next 6 months.

Including St Paul's, eleven new Anglican churches were constructed during 1924 in the Brisbane Diocese. This boom occurred within a much wider context of surging building activity and expansion in Brisbane during the 1920s, reflecting a level of prosperity that had not been seen in the city since the 1880s. By 1929, Greater Brisbane boasted a population of 284,758 people, a substantial increase from an estimated 209,946 in 1921. In early 1923 it was claimed the new buildings and improvements underway or planned constituted "the biggest building boom in the history of the city". Over the next few years the built environment of the city and growing suburban areas was rapidly transformed. As one of Brisbane's leading architectural firms, Atkinson and Conrad were closely involved in this process, designing numerous commercial, civic and residential buildings.

St Paul's was dedicated by Archbishop Sharp on Sunday 21 September 1924. During the ceremony the Archbishop expressed his joy at dedicating the church "which he was instrumental in furthering" and was "glad of the movement which is manifestly taking place to build adequate and permanent Churches in this city and in this Diocese". Parish rector Reverend George Neal estimated the final cost of the church, together with the site, at between £6000 and £7000.

On its opening, the church was described as "embod[ying] many of the latest ideas of ecclesiastical architecture". The diocesan publication the Church Chronicle praised the "pleasing and dignified design" and the wider windows and roof ventilation system used to keep the building cool. Other ventilation features were a pair of doorways on both sides of the nave enclosed by balustrading, and metal grilles in the chancel window sills, allowing air to be drawn in through the walls. In January 1925 the Church Chronicle published internal and external images of St Paul's, "in order that other parishes may be inspired to friendly rivalry with the people of East Brisbane and desire to do similar good work".

On opening and in later years, a number of parishioners donated furnishings and ecclesiastical requisites to the church: Mrs J Tritton (of home furnishing firm Tritton's) purchased a bell for the belfry (in use from September 1926); Dr GWF Paul provided a font ewer (water jug) in memory of his son; Mr Rolley provided latches and handles for the main doors; Mrs D'Arcy Winten provided a silver chalice and paten (plate), and Lucy Carey and her daughter provided a hymn board in memory of her son Archibald who died in France during World War I. The parish Girls' Guild donated a timber altar (inscribed "To the dear memory of those who served in the Great War 1914-1918") and the lectern with a brass eagle, which came from England. In 1931 two Exton and Co. stained glass windows, dedicated to the late Ethel Hobday, were donated as a gift from her family, "a beautiful addition to an already beautiful church". A psalm board dedicated to the memory of Corporal Ray Diggles of the Women's Auxiliary Air Force (WAAF) was donated after her death in 1942. A sanctuary lamp was dedicated in 1951 in memory of Elizabeth Hastings and Theresa Day.

After the church's completion, the parish continued to hold fundraising events to pay off the remainder of the debt. In 1935 succeeding priest Rev. John Parker made an early speech in support of ecumenism; "I am looking forward to the day when there will be no barrier between the denominations". St Paul's was consecrated in a ceremony on 29 August 1937, having met the requirements: permanency of building, freedom of debt, and the vesting of the property in the Synod. The parish also celebrated its jubilee anniversary in that year. In 1942 an adjacent property "Ormside" was purchased for a rectory, following the sale of the old church and hall site in Edgar Street. Following the death of Rev. Parker in 1947, a granite baptismal font was dedicated in his memory.

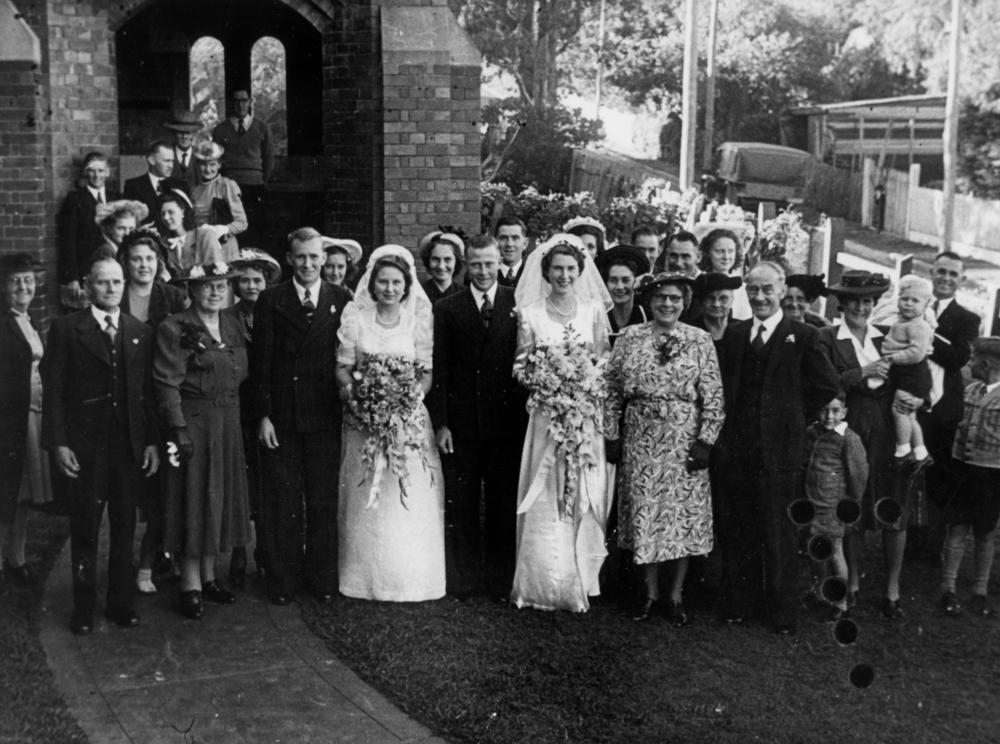
Double wedding at St Paul's, 1949

In addition to being the focus of local worship, a number of associated groups were active in the parish, including the Girls Friendly Society, Boys Society, Mothers Union, Women's Guild and Parents Auxiliary. St Paul's became a very popular wedding venue in Brisbane, with newspapers reporting weekly on the numerous ceremonies performed there.

In October 1949, a day of record rainfall caused part of the stone wall facing Vulture Street to be washed away, later replaced by a concrete wall. In June 1952 an illuminated cross on top of the church was destroyed by a shotgun blast fired from a car, thought by police to be the work of "anti-religious cranks".

In 1954, a columbarium was controversially built at the rear of the church. Columbariums, walls with niches for the ashes of the dead, became more common at churches and cemeteries, in response to the increased acceptance of cremation. Australia's first columbarium was built in Box Hill in Victoria in 1929. Cremation services first became available in Queensland in September 1934, when the Mount Thompson crematorium opened. The following year a columbarium was provided at Mount Thompson. By 1936, 13% of people interred in Brisbane were being cremated. The increased popularity of cremation led to requests for ashes to be deposited at Anglican churches. The Archbishop of the time, Dr William Wand, publicly opposed placing ashes in the main body of the church, preferring a designated annex such as a remodelled crypt or eastward extension. Queensland's first columbaria within churches were built at Holy Trinity Anglican Church, Woolloongabba and St Mark's Anglican Church, Warwick in 1938. The first external columbarium was incorporated into an outer wall of St Mary's Church at Kangaroo Point in 1949.

When the plan to construct a columbarium at St Paul's became known, 150 local residents signed a petition presented to Brisbane's Lord Mayor Alderman Frank Edward Roberts, "desiring the district to remain a pleasant residential one" and considering the crematorium or a nearby cemetery a more suitable location for storing ashes. The Brisbane City Council was powerless to act, as the approval was not necessary under their jurisdiction. Contained within an area of 30 by 15 feet (9.1 by 4.6 m), the columbarium, a roofless structure of four 10-foot (3.0 m) high brick walls with a wrought iron gated entrance, was constructed at a cost of £1000 and dedicated on 4 July 1954. The gate was donated in memory of Margaret Pashen by her family. Speaking in defence of the columbarium, the Rector, the Rev. NR Tomlinson, described it as "the modern version of the old church grave yard". At the opening ceremony Archbishop Reginald Halse stated, "Early Christians had raised no objection to cremation, but had buried their dead because of heathen rites which used fire. It was now felt cremation was just as respectful to the dead as burial. It also conformed with the words of the burial service 'ashes to ashes'". Since opening, the columbarium has been used to store the ashes of many former parishioners, including those of Rev. Tomlinson.

Over time, some alterations and additions have occurred at St Paul's. Between the church and the rectory, a brick war memorial hall (not considered to be of state heritage significance) was built after 1945. The balustrade-enclosed doorway on the western side of the nave was opened to provide access, via a timber ramp. The chairs originally used by worshippers were replaced by timber pews. A Whitehouse Brothers organ, built in 1952 for the Baptist Church at Wynnum was installed on a raised platform at the rear of the church in 1993. The original organ vestry has been converted into a chapel. The roof of the church was replaced in 1997.

In 2013, St Paul's continues to fulfil its essential function as a place of worship for East Brisbane Anglicans.

== Description ==
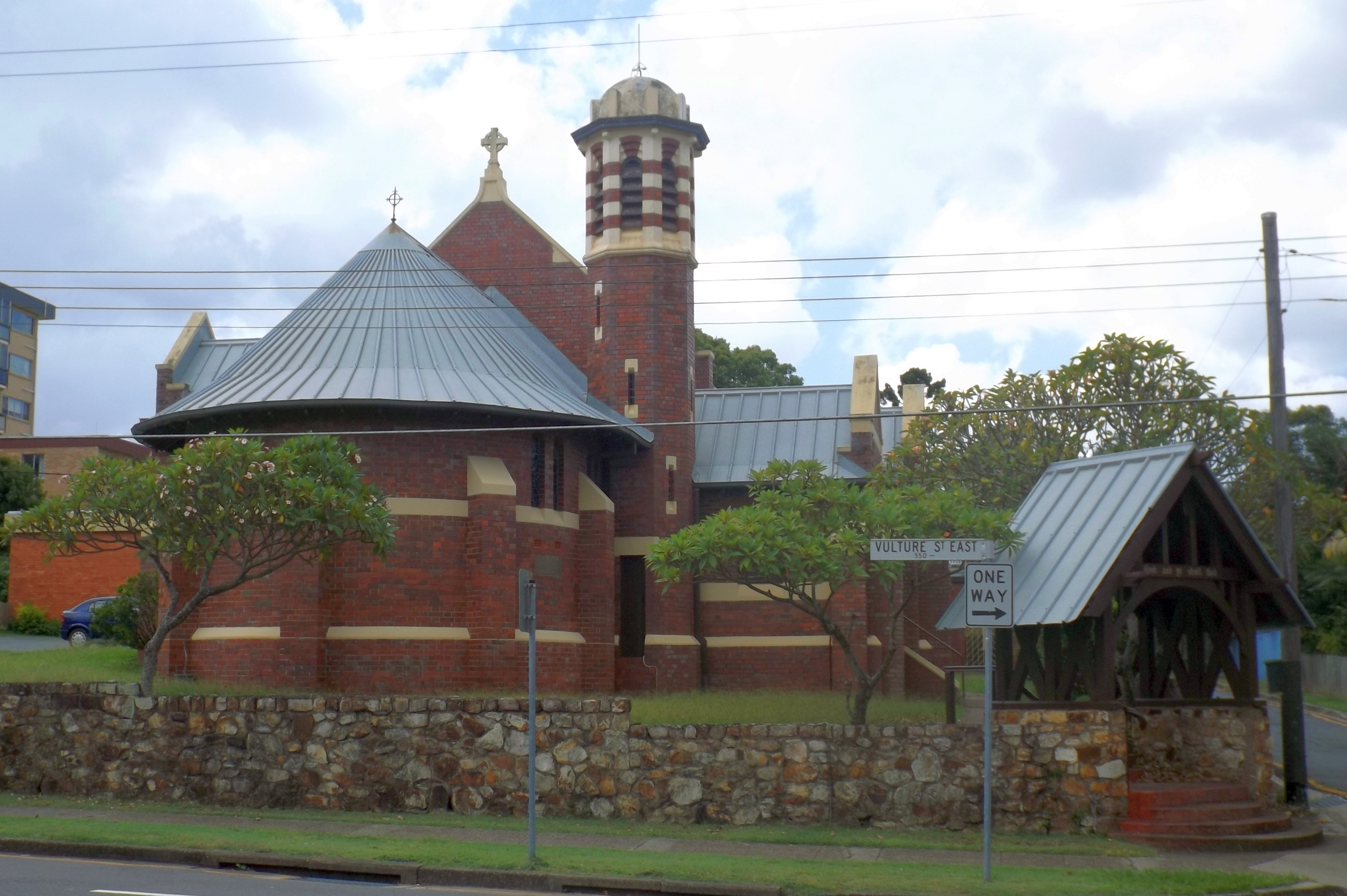
View from Vulture Street East, 2015

St Paul's Anglican Church is situated prominently on an elevated site at the corner of Vulture Street and Balmoral Terrace in East Brisbane. The site comprises a picturesque brick church, timber lych gate, stone retaining walls and a brick columbarium. A toilet block and shed on the north side of the church are within the boundary but are not of cultural heritage significance.

The church is of traditional gabled form. The nave is at its north (symbolic west) end and an extended chancel with apse under a conical roof at its south (symbolic east) end. Facing Balmoral Terrace, the entrance porch is located on the north-east corner of the nave and, flanking the intersection of the nave and chancel, are two adjacent vestries and a tall bell tower. On the western side of the chancel is a high-ceilinged organ chamber, now used as a chapel.

Employing asymmetry, heavy massing, high quality brickwork, semi-circular forms and simplified ornamentation, the design of St Paul's combines characteristics of Gothic, Romanesque and Arts and Crafts styles. The church is constructed in dark-red-brown Flemish bond brickwork, with painted render dressings defining features such as string courses, copings, lintels and sills (internally and externally). Stepped and plain buttresses support the exterior walls, and arched openings are constructed from multiple rowlock (brick-on-edge) courses. The prominent roof form is clad with rib-and-pan profile metal sheeting (replaced in 1997), and features flared eaves supported on decoratively trimmed rafters with a raked soffit of tongue-and-groove boards. The nave end walls are topped with stone cross finials, and gable ends to the vestries and entrance porch are finished with basket weave patterned brickwork. The entrance porch features a radiating arch with deep angled brick jambs, rounded window openings and a boarded ceiling. The belfry atop the octagonal bell tower is enclosed with fixed timber louvres between brick piers of alternating, three-course bands of rendered and face brickwork capped by a concrete hemispherical cupola.

The interior is well detailed and executed with dark stained timber joinery throughout, except for the contrasting honey-coloured boards that line the raked ceiling. Finely detailed trusses, supported on concrete corbels, incorporate semi-circular laminated arches of three vertical layers, bolted and strapped together at intervals. Within the semi-circular apse, the ceiling boards are tapered to a narrow point to form a conical peak. Decorative timber grilles along the apex of the nave and chancel ceiling combined with metal grilles in the chancel window sills are elements of the original ventilation system.

All doors are framed and ledged, most retaining original hardware including locks, metal bolts, keyhole covers and timber reeded knobs, with elaborate metal hinges on exterior doors. Side doors open onto raised semicircular concrete balconies, with the western balcony balustrade cut back to allow access from an adjacent car park.

The nave is lit by tall, timber-framed casement windows with leaded panes of textured green glass and semi-circular fanlights. Window hardware includes ornamental latch handles with spiral end. Three large stained glass windows in the north wall depict intertwined vines, wreaths and religious symbols – the "alpha" symbol in the western window, "IHS" (a Christogram) in the central window, and the "omega" symbol in the eastern window. Stained glass windows in the chancel depict Jesus, various saints and biblical scenes, with some including dedications to parishioners. Red cement-rendered floors, scored to form a square grid, are found throughout the church and entrance porch, except in the chancel, which has been subsequently tiled, and in the former organ chamber, where it is covered in carpet.

Church furniture is generally dark stained timber. The altar table, of carved timber panels, features gilded lettering – "TO THE DEAR MEMORY OF THOSE WHO SERVED IN THE GREAT WAR 1914–18" – across the front face. A sanctuary lamp is suspended over the altar. Various early timber items including chairs, tables, and psalm and hymn boards are found throughout the church and vestries. The timber altar rails remain within the chancel; however these and the altar table have been moved from their original positions. Other notable items within the chancel include: the foundation stone set into the eastern wall and a concrete plaque with a red Canterbury cross on the western wall, commemorating the consecration of the church in 1937. Facing the nave from the eastern side of the chancel steps is a raised octagonal brick pulpit finished with a rendered base and capping, while on the western side is a movable brass lectern topped by an eagle. The timber pews (replacing earlier chairs) are plain and stained a light colour. An octagonal, granite memorial baptismal font with timber lid is located near the centre of the nave. The organ (not original to the church) is on a raised timber platform in the north-west corner of the nave.

Non-significant additions to the church interior include a boarded lining to the chapel and northern nave walls, carpets, fluorescent lighting and ceiling fans.

The lych gate, flanked on both sides by random rubble retaining walls, defines the main entrance to the church grounds at the corner of Vulture Street and Balmoral Terrace. Constructed from heavy timbers, it has decorative cross bracing and a gable roof, clad in metal roof sheeting and lined with timber tongue and groove boards. Curved brackets on the street-facing side form an archway, above which the words "Seek and ye shall find" are carved in Gothic-style script. Curved red concrete steps ascend from street level to the gate, before continuing as straight steps up to a red concrete pathway leading to the entrance porch.

The columbarium in the north-east corner of the site, separated from the church by a narrow walkway, is a small, open-walled courtyard, accessed through an arched opening with a metal gate. The tall, orange brick walls, capped by concrete, contain small niches, with those containing ashes enclosed by brass name plaques. Rectangular garden beds are set into the concrete floor.

== Heritage listing ==
St Paul's Anglican Church and Columbarium was listed on the Queensland Heritage Register on 7 February 2014 having satisfied the following criteria.

The place is important in demonstrating the evolution or pattern of Queensland's history.

St Paul's Church East Brisbane is important in demonstrating the development of the Anglican church in Queensland. It was built in 1924 during a pronounced period of expansion, when many new ecclesiastical buildings were constructed by the Anglican church, especially in the Brisbane Diocese. The church also demonstrates the wider growth of Brisbane and rapid development of the city's built environment in the 1920s.

The detached columbarium at St Paul's, built in 1954 in response to the increasing use of cremation, is one of the earliest structures of its type built in Queensland.

The place is important in demonstrating the principal characteristics of a particular class of cultural places.

St Paul's is important in demonstrating the principal characteristics of 1920s Anglican church architecture in Queensland, expressed in its form, exterior detail and internal layout, fittings, fixtures and decorative treatments. Designed by eminent diocesan architects Atkinson and Conrad, the church is notable for its restrained and simplified brick treatment. The church accommodates traditional internal spaces and elements including the nave, chancel and vestries, coloured glass windows, and ecclesiastical furnishings. The lych gate and stone wall illustrate the revived use of such traditional features during this period.

The 1954 columbarium also demonstrates the principal characteristics of its type; discreetly located within the church ground, the space is enclosed with walls containing niches for ashes of the dead.

The place is important because of its aesthetic significance.

St Paul's has aesthetic significance as a highly picturesque church, employing asymmetry, heavy massing, high quality brickwork, semi-circular forms and simplified ornamentation. The interior, with its dark brickwork and prominent timber roof trusses, evokes a sense of peace and spiritual shelter. The internal and external elements of St Paul's combine to create a cohesive and finely detailed whole.

Sited in an elevated position to express the prominence of the Anglican community, St Paul's makes an important architectural contribution to the Vulture Street streetscape and to the suburb of East Brisbane.
