= West End State School =

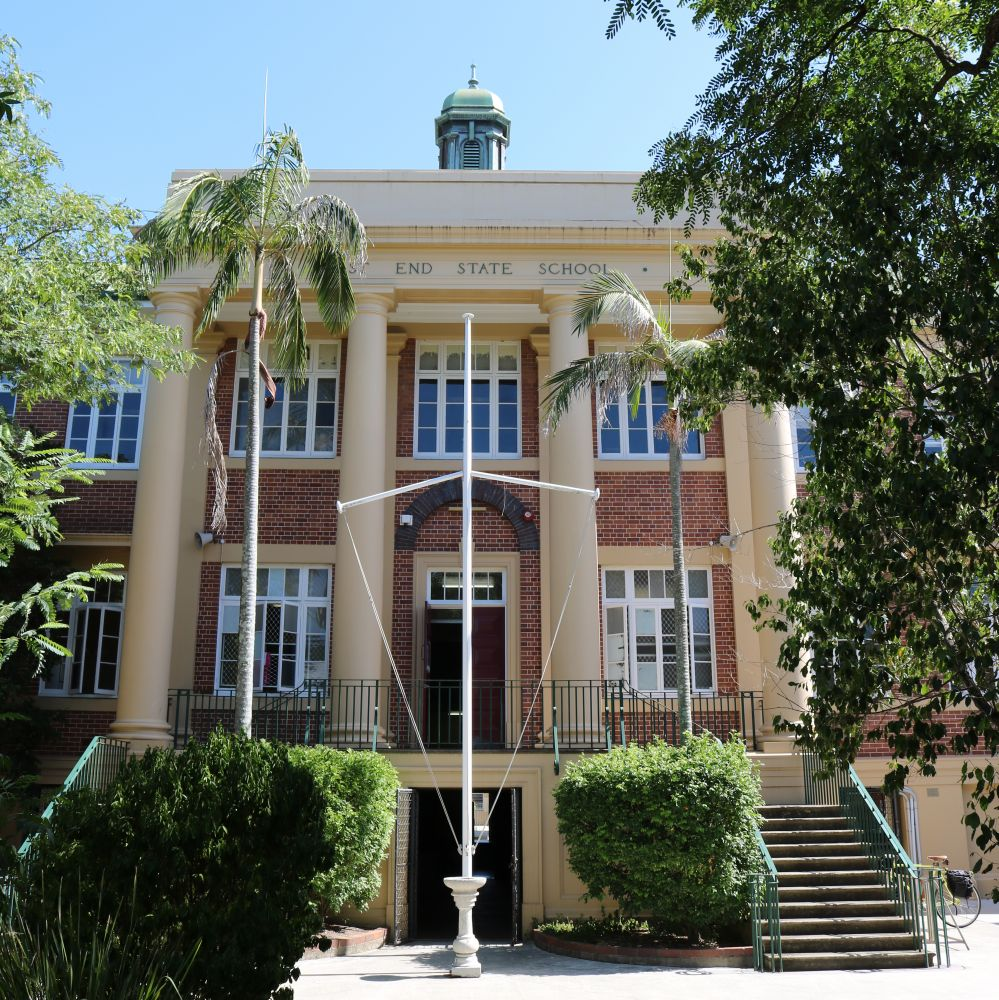
- West End State School, 2018

- Location within Queensland
- 27.4796°S 153.0081°E
- Location: 24 Vulture Street, West End, City of Brisbane, Queensland, Australia

History
- Design period: 1919–1930s (Interwar period)
- Built: 1891–1960, 1929–1931, 1930–1947, 1930–1947, 1930, 1936

Site notes
- Architectural style: Classicism

Queensland Heritage Register
- Official name: West End State School
- Type: state heritage
- Designated: 24 April 2018
- Reference no.: 650061
- Type: Education, Research, Scientific Facility: School – state (primary)
- Theme: Creating social and cultural institutions: Commemorating significant events; Educating Queenslanders: Providing primary schooling

West End State School is a heritage-listed state school at 24 Vulture Street, West End, City of Brisbane, Queensland, Australia. It was built from 1891 to 1960. It was added to the Queensland Heritage Register on 24 April 2018.

== History ==
West End State School (established 1875), located in the inner Brisbane suburb of West End, about 1.2 kilometres southwest of the Brisbane central business district (CBD), is important in demonstrating the evolution of state education and its associated architecture. It retains a Depression-era brick school building (1936, extended 1976, 1984), set in landscaped grounds including a Memorial Fountain (1930), mature trees and perimeter retaining walls (pre-WWII, 1947). The school has a strong and ongoing association with its surrounding community.

Traditionally part of the land of the Turrbal and Jagera people, land in the vicinity of the West End State School site was sold by the Queensland colonial government from the 1840s as suburban allotments of about 1–10 acres (0.40–4.05 ha) . A map from 1844 shows the site of the West End State School designated as a cemetery. Subdivision of suburban allotments at West End into housing sites commenced in the early 1860s. The unused 5 acres (2.0 ha) cemetery site was converted to a reserve for a state school. A newspaper article from February 1864 reported that only one person was buried in the West End Cemetery during its operation. The cemetery closed c. 1865.

The establishment of schools was considered an essential step in the development of new communities and integral to their success. Schools became a community focus, with the school community contributing to their maintenance and development; a symbol of progress; and a source of pride, with enduring connections formed with past pupils, parents and teachers. West End State School opened on 16 August 1875, with 236 pupils enrolled. it comprised a brick school-house, accommodating the girls, boys, and infants schools. The building was designed by architect Richard Suter and erected by F Chapman and cost approximately £1,650.

By the 1880s further residential subdivision in the West End area had led to overcrowding in the school. Tenders were called for a new timber West End State School for Boys in July 1884. This was built facing Hardgrave Road and was opened near the end of August 1885. The original brick school building became the West End Girls and Infants School. A large fence constructed through the centre of the grounds separated the two schools. A timber addition on the western side of the brick building (West End Girls and Infants School Building) was constructed in 1892.

An important component of Queensland state schools was their grounds. The early and continuing commitment to play-based education, particularly in primary school, resulted in the provision of outdoor play space and sporting facilities, such as ovals and tennis courts. Also, trees and gardens were planted to shade and beautify schools. In the 1870s, schools inspector William Boyd had been critical of tropical schools and amongst his recommendations stressed the importance of adding shade trees to playgrounds. Subsequently, Arbor Day was celebrated in Queensland from 1890. Aesthetically designed gardens were encouraged by regional inspectors, and educators believed gardening and Arbor Days instilled in young minds the value of hard work and activity, improved classroom discipline, developed aesthetic tastes, and inspired people to stay on the land. At West End Boys, Girls and Infants School, 12 trees were planted by the boys on the first Arbor Day, held on 1 August 1890: four bamboo (unknown genus and species), three silky oak (Grevillea robusta), two Moreton Bay figs (Ficus macrophylla), and three Phytolacca. Within a year, four of the trees had perished. However, another 15 trees were planted in 1891 and further trees were planted in subsequent years.

Although the 1893 Brisbane floods affected all the shoreline around West End and slowed development in the area, both the suburban and the school population continued to rise leading up to the 1930s. West End became a popular residential area due to its close proximity to the Brisbane CBD, local employment, and transport options. Trains ran from South Brisbane railway station (originally the Melbourne Street railway station), which was the terminus for all rail services on the south side of the Brisbane River, from 1884. An electric tram service along Vulture and Hardgrave Streets opened in 1898, placing most residents and workers within easy walking distance of a tram stop. This service was extended to the St Lucia ferry at the end of Hoogley Street in 1929.

West End State School continued to grow as the suburb developed. Circa 1924, timber teachers rooms were added to the verandah of the Girls and Infants Building, and an extension was added to eastern end of the building. Around the same time, the 1884 Boys School was extended to form an "L" shape.

In 1930, three black terrazzo memorial drinking fountains were presented by the Kurilpa Ladies' War Memorial Committee to each of the three schools comprising the West End State School. The fountains were dedicated to the victims of World War I at a ceremony held on 24 April 1930 to commemorate the 15th anniversary of Anzac Day. It was unveiled on 24 April 1930 by James Fry, Member for the Queensland Legislative Assembly for Kurilpa.

The Great Depression, which commenced in 1929 and extended well into the 1930s, caused a dramatic reduction of public building work in Queensland and brought private building work to a standstill. In response, the Queensland Government provided relief work for unemployed Queenslanders, and also embarked on an ambitious and important building program to provide impetus to the economy.

Even before the October 1929 stock market crash, the Queensland Government initiated an Unemployment Relief Scheme, through a work program administered by the Department of Public Works (DPW). This included painting and repairs to school buildings. By mid-1930 men were undertaking grounds improvement works to schools under the scheme. At West End State School, the school committee, with assistance from unemployment relief gangs organised by the DPW, converted the school grounds into "suitable sport areas" over a two-year period ending in March 1931.

In June 1932 the Forgan Smith Labor Government came to power with a campaign that advocated increased government spending to counter the effects of the Depression. The government embarked on a large public building program designed to promote the employment of local skilled workers, the purchase of local building materials and the production of commodious, low maintenance buildings which would be a long-term asset to the state. The construction of substantial brick school buildings in prosperous or growing suburban areas and regional centres during the 1930s provided tangible proof of the government's commitment to remedy the unemployment situation.

Overcrowding at West End State School, where enrolments totalled 885 pupils by the early 1930s, led to a deputation of concerned parents meeting with the Minister for Public Instruction (Frank Cooper) in November 1934. On 20 December 1934, the DPW announced that approval had been given for a "Rebuilding Scheme" at the school.

Plans for the Rebuilding Scheme were drawn in 1934–35. The DPW architects involved were Nigel L Thomas, William J Moulds and Gilbert R Beveridge (assistant architects). The brick building contained 17 classrooms to accommodate 730 pupils. Allowance was made for future extensions to the east and west wings to ultimately accommodate 890 pupils. It comprised an undercroft (containing lavatory blocks and lay areas), a first floor (containing eight classrooms, cloakrooms, head teachers office and teachers room) and second floor (containing nine classrooms, cloakrooms and teachers room). Three classrooms on each floor had folding partitions which when opened formed assembly rooms. The floors of play areas, lavatory blocks, porches, corridors, cloakrooms, and internal and external stairs were of concrete. The building aligned with the Vulture Street frontage and replaced the 1875 brick building. Its preliminary cost was estimated at £16,030.

Depression-era brick school buildings form a recognisable and important type, exhibiting many common characteristics. Most were designed in a classical idiom to project the sense of stability and optimism which the government sought to convey through the architecture of its public buildings. Frequently, they were two storeys above an open undercroft and built to accommodate up to 1000 students. They adopted a symmetrical plan form and often exhibited a prominent central entry. The plan arrangement was similar to that of timber buildings, being only one classroom deep, accessed by a long straight verandah or corridor. Due to their long plan forms of multiple wings, they could be built in stages if necessary; resulting in some complete designs never being realised. Classrooms were commonly divided by folding timber partitions and the undercroft was used as covered play space, storage, ablutions and other functions.

Despite their similarities, each Depression-era Brick School building was individually designed by a DPW architect, which resulted in a wide range of styles and ornamental features being utilised within the overall set. These styles, which were derived from contemporary tastes and fashions, included: Arts and Crafts, typified by half-timbered gable-ends; Spanish Mission, with round-arched openings and decorative parapets; and Neo-classical, with pilasters, columns and large triangular pediments. Over time, variations occurred in building size, decorative treatment, and climatic-responsive features.

The Depression-era brick school building at West End State School (now called the Main Admin Building) was completed in 1936 and occupied on 30 June of that year by the amalgamated West End Girls and Boys Schools. The building was officially opened on 28 November 1936 by the Minister for Public Instruction, Frank Cooper. The Telegraph newspaper reported the Depression-era brick school building had cost £20,410.

In 1937, two of the school's earlier buildings, located behind (north) of the Depression-era brick school building were renovated for £1,600 for domestic science and manual arts training, which had not been offered on site previously. The first domestic science and manual arts classes commenced in 1938.

The West End Infants School remained separate. It relocated to the old Boys' School (1884 timber building) facing Hardgrave Road, after extensions and the addition, to the southeast corner, of the relocated (c. 1924) infants school extension. A new fence separated the Infants' School from main school grounds.

During World War II, the Queensland Government closed all coastal state schools in January 1942 due to fears of a Japanese invasion, and although most schools reopened on 2 March 1942, student attendance was optional until the war ended. Slit trenches, to protect the students from Japanese air raids, were also dug at Queensland state schools, often by parents and staff. At West End State School, trenches were dug in the play grounds by parents, past pupils, wardens and United States soldiers.

Typically, schools were a focus for civilian duty during wartime. At many schools, students and staff members grew produce and flowers for donation to local hospitals and organised fundraising and the donation of useful items to Australian soldiers on active service. Air Raid Precautions (ARP) meetings were held at West End State School.

Upgrading of the school grounds took place after World War II. Concrete retaining walls were built on the corner of Vulture Street and Hardgrave Road in 1947. The work included new chain-wire, timber-framed fence above the new retaining wall and along the boundaries of Hardgrave Road, Jane and Horan Streets. The pre-existing angled rock-faced retaining walls to the Vulture, Horan and Jane Street frontages were retained, and the fencing along the remainder of the Vulture Street frontage was not changed at this time.

After World War II, West End State School enrolments continued to grow and the multicultural nature of the school became established as the proportion of West End's population born overseas increased. By 1950, West End had a substantial Greek population and became known as "Little Athens". West End's overseas-born population numbered about a third in 1971. Greater ethnic diversity was apparent by 1981. Vietnamese migrants had taken up residence in West End and outnumbered Greek-born residents. Cypriots, Lebanese, Turks and Egyptians also had a strong presence, as well as residents from Britain, Ireland and New Zealand, and the indigenous population.

Additions were made to the Depression-era brick school building, comprising a western wing extension in 1976 and an east wing in 1983–1984. These additions complied with the intent of planned extensions to both ends of the building, as drawn in December 1934, but not the original floor plan. The proposed extensions were located north of stairwells at each end of the building.

The 1976 extension accommodated one large room on each level: a "general activity" room on the undercroft level; a library on the first floor; and a music and movement room on the second floor. The plans were prepared by the DPW and varied from the original plans in several ways. The side verandah was not continued along the projection. Instead, the new rooms occupied the full width of the wing. The floor of the first floor room was higher than the original to allow a higher ceiling in the undercroft area, thereby requiring steps to access the first floor extension. These changes are reflected in the elevations, with sill heights and banding not matching the original. However, the extension matches the height of the original so that the roof profile is consistent. The extension is contemporary in style but complementary to the original in form.

In 1983–1984 the Depression-era brick school building was extended with a projection to the eastern end of the building, to plans prepared by the Department of Works in early 1983. This extension matched the earlier 1976 extension, including the change in floor level to the first floor and lack of continuation of the verandah, but was slightly larger. It also incorporated the same brick finishes and detailing, and was contemporary in style but complementary to the original building in form. The first and second floors accommodated one large room each for "double teaching areas". The undercroft of this extension remained open after completion, but a portion was designated as "Future Tuckshop" on the plans. The tuckshop was completed in 1992 when the end bay of the open basement was enclosed with brickwork. Further alterations to the Depression-era brick school building, as part of the "Building Better Schools" program in 2000, included installation of kitchen areas.

In 1995, the West End Primary School and West End Infants School were amalgamated as the West End State School and the dividing fence between them removed.

Between 1988 and 1997, a masonry portico was added on the north side of the Depression-era brick school building, leading to the central staircase.

In 2018, as well as the Depression-era brick school building, the original, heavily modified, 1884 boys school building, with the 1924 girls school extension attached, remain on site. Modern buildings have also been added to the site. A school swimming pool, on the Hardgrave Road side of the school, opened in 1990, and the pool stadium was constructed in 2000. Only one fig tree (Ficus sp.) planted before World War II survives, located in the rainforest area in the southwest corner of the school grounds. Nearby is the remnant trunk of a large fig tree (Ficus sp.) planted in the school's courtyard and mature well before World War II, which was felled by a storm in November 2014. Three trees of the same species, planted on the northern (playing field) boundary between 1946 and 1960, also remain (unidentified sp.).

Throughout the school's history, community and social events to fund-raise and celebrate milestones, have taken place at the school. School anniversaries have been celebrated and fetes have been conducted throughout the school's history. In 1951, the West End State School Diamond Jubilee fete and the unveiling of a memorial plaque took place in the school grounds. The P&C Association continued to organise school fetes in the school grounds to raise funds for school amenities. The school celebrated its centenary anniversary in 1975 and to commemorate its 125th anniversary in 2000, published the school's history.

In 2018, the school continues to operate from its original site. It retains its Depression-era brick school building, set in landscaped grounds with Memorial Fountain, retaining walls, sporting facilities, assembly and playing areas, and mature shade trees. West End State School is important to the West End district as a key social focus for the community, as generations of students have been taught there and many social events held in the school's grounds and buildings since its establishment.

== Description ==
West End State School occupies a 1.9-hectare (4.7-acre) site in West End, south=west of Brisbane's CBD. The school occupies an entire block and is bounded by Vulture Street to the south (to which it fronts), Jane Street to the north, Horan Street to the east, and Hardgrave Road to the west.

A substantial Depression-era brick school building (1936) stands to the front of the school grounds, facing the main entrance. It is conspicuous in the area due to its handsome architecture and substantial size. The school grounds have been levelled, with stone-pitched and concrete retaining walls on the boundaries. The school also has mature trees, a WWI memorial drinking fountain, and a large grass playing field.

=== Depression-era brick school building (1936) ===
The Depression-era brick school building is a symmetrical two-storey building, highset on a undercroft. It is "E" shaped in plan with its long flank facing south to Vulture Street and its centre aligns with the main pedestrian entrance. It comprises an undercroft level of open playing spaces and toilets below two levels of teaching rooms and has a hipped roof clad with metal sheets. At the roof's central peak is a prominent metal ventilation fleche with round cupola, visible from the surrounding neighbourhood.

The building character expresses a composed simplicity through the use of attractive, simple, and low maintenance materials with minimal decorative features, including extensive use of face bricks contrasting with smooth-rendered concrete and plain, regular fenestration. The elevations use smooth-rendered masonry for the undercroft and face brick on the first and second floors, with rendered sills, lintels, capitals, and frieze. The face bricks are mid-red with white tuck pointing with prominent architectural elements in dark bricks with darker mortar. Throughout the building, the brickwork includes moulded bricks with rounded corners at body height. The building's eaves are lined with sheets and battens. The building has timber floors in the classrooms (with large steel floor beams in the undercroft) and concrete floors in the circulation spaces and teachers rooms.

The building form is a long wing with a short perpendicular wing at either end that projects north. These wings have been extended further north by one large room on each level. Providing access to the rooms, a long open verandah runs across the rear (north) and returns at the end wings, terminating at the extensions.

Reached by a split, cement rendered stair with iron railings, the front elevation has a projecting central entrance portico with four double-height rendered concrete columns. These support a deep entablature and cornice with "WEST END STATE SCHOOL" in raised letters. Large, regular banks of timber-framed casement windows with fanlights run the length of the front elevation. The windows of the first floor are sheltered by a continuous rendered hood with elaborate scrolled brackets. The main entry into the building is via a pair of tall timber-framed doors with bolection moulded panels and a glazed fanlight.

The side elevations (east and west) of the original portion are blank except for timber-framed casement windows into the cloak rooms and stairwells. The rear elevation has a projecting central block accommodating teachers rooms and a stairwell with a tall, arch-headed window of fixed timber-framed panes.

The sides and rear elevations of the end wing extensions (1974 - west, and 1984 - east) are complementary in character, materials, and composition, however, they do not mimic the detail of the earlier portion. Their roofs and eaves lines are continuous from the earlier portion, although the building bulk is slightly greater and they do not continue the open corridors. They have a rendered basement level and a face brick first and second floor and bays defined by double-height dark brick pilasters, similar to the earlier portion but they have aluminium-framed casement windows with fanlights sheltered by metal hoods. The open undercroft area of the 1984 extension has been partially enclosed with face brick to form a tuckshop (1992).

The corridors on first and second floors have a concrete floor with coved edges and a spoon drain on the outer edge. The ceilings are lined with sheets and battens except for the central area, which is smooth-plastered with a moulded plaster cornice. The wall between the corridor and rooms has timber-framed two-leaf, panelled doors, timber-framed double-hung windows, and glazed awning fanlights. Some doors, windows, and fanlights have been replaced or closed over.

The first and second floors comprise classrooms, teachers rooms, and former hat and cloak rooms that have been enclosed to form store rooms and further teachers rooms. The rooms have smooth-rendered walls with an inscribed skirting line in the teachers rooms and former cloak rooms and moulded timber skirting boards in the classrooms. The door and window openings are square-finished without architraves. Original and early brass door and window hardware is retained throughout. The ceilings are sheet-and-battens with a square timber cornice with those of the second floor retaining a central timber lattice ventilation panel.

Three stairwells provide vertical circulation and have fixed multi-paned windows; the windows in the eastern stair have been replaced with glass blocks. The stairs are concrete and have decorative iron balustrades with a moulded, clear-finished timber handrail. In the stair halls the perimeter of the concrete floor is coved to the wall and a small store room is located under the western stair.

Originally open play spaces with toilets at both ends, the undercroft has been partitioned to form store and workshop rooms by chain link fences and brick and timber partitions. The floor is concrete and the walls are rendered. Low-level timber seats are fixed to the walls. The original toilet spaces have been refitted, but, one small section of original timber partitions is retained in the western end male teachers toilet. All undercroft windows have been replaced with glass louvres, which are not of state level cultural heritage significance.

=== WWI Memorial Drinking Fountain (1930) ===
Standing on the ground at the front entrance of the school is a WWI memorial drinking fountain, aligned with the centre of the Depression-era brick school building. It is a round pedestal cast using white stone and black cement terrazzo. It does not have a faucet or drain cover and no longer flows. Two identical plaques on the only remaining fountain read:

"this fountain was erected by the residents of Kurilpa in memory of those who gave their lives in the Great War, 1914-1918. Unveiled 24.4.30 by J P Fry, Esq. M.L.A., Member for Kurilpa".

One plaque has been added to the fountain later, presumably from one of the two other fountains that were built at the time. It is identifiable by its more recent screws.

=== Landscape Features ===
A stone pitched retaining wall stands on the Vulture, Horan, and Jane street boundaries.

A cement rendered masonry stair with a wrought iron double gate and cement rendered pillars stands at the centre of the Vulture Street frontage of the school. It is the main pedestrian entrance and leads down into the front garden.

An off-form concrete retaining wall (1947) stands on the school boundary, wrapping the Hardgrave Road and Vulture Street corner.

A large grass playing field occupies the northern part (rear) of the site and is bordered by trees on the boundary of the school ground. The trees and field are a contrasting open green space in the closely-developed inner city surroundings. Early jacarandas (Jacaranda mimosifolia) stand on the Jane Street boundary.

A mature fig tree (Ficus sp.) stands near the corner of Vulture Street and Hardgrave Road.

== Heritage listing ==
West End State School was listed on the Queensland Heritage Register on 24 April 2018 having satisfied the following criteria.

The place is important in demonstrating the evolution or pattern of Queensland's history.

West End State School (established in 1875) is important in demonstrating the evolution of state education and its associated architecture in Queensland.

The place retains an excellent example of a Depression-era brick school building, which was an architectural response to prevailing government educational philosophies; set in landscaped grounds with assembly and play areas, sporting facilities and mature trees.

The Depression-era brick school building (1936) and the creation of the school playing field are the result of the Queensland Government's building and relief work programs during the 1930s that stimulated the economy and provided work for men unemployed as a result of the Great Depression.

Extensions made to the 1936 building in 1976 and 1984 comply with the intention of the original building plan, but reflect later educational philosophies and architectural styles demonstrated in larger classroom size and increased natural light and ventilation.

The World War I Memorial Fountain (1930) is important in demonstrating the school community's involvement in a major world event. War memorials are a tribute from the community to those who served, and those who died. They are an important element of Queensland's towns and cities and are also important in demonstrating a common pattern of commemoration across Queensland and Australia.

The place is important in demonstrating the principal characteristics of a particular class of cultural places.

West End State School is important in demonstrating the principal characteristics of a Queensland state school. These include: teaching buildings constructed to standard designs; and a generous, landscaped site, with mature trees, assembly and play areas, and sporting facilities. The school is a good, intact example of a suburban school complex, including a Depression-era brick school building with later extensions.

The Depression-era brick school building and its extensions, designed by the Department of Public Works, is an excellent, substantial, and intact example of its type. It is important in demonstrating the principal characteristics, which include: a handsome edifice standing at the front of the school; symmetrical two-storey form of classrooms and teachers rooms above an undercroft of open play spaces; a linear layout of the main floors with rooms accessed by corridors; loadbearing masonry construction; prominent projecting central entrance bay, and high-quality design to provide superior educational environments that focus on abundant natural light and ventilation. It demonstrates the use of stylistic features of its era, which determined its roof form, joinery, and decorative treatment.

The place is important because of its aesthetic significance.

Through its elegant composition of formal and decorative elements, substantial size and materials, the highly intact Depression-era brick school building at West End State School has aesthetic significance due to its expressive attributes, by which the Department of Public Works sought to convey the concepts of progress and permanence.

The building is also significant for its streetscape contribution. Framed by mature trees, the building's assertive massing, classically influenced design, and elegant composition contribute to its dignified presence as an attractive and prominent feature in the streetscape.

The place has a strong or special association with a particular community or cultural group for social, cultural or spiritual reasons.

Schools have always played an important part in Queensland communities. They typically retain significant and enduring connections with former pupils, parents, and teachers; provide a venue for social interaction and volunteer work; and are a source of pride, symbolising local progress and aspirations.

West End State School has a strong and ongoing association with the West End community. It was established in 1875 through the fundraising efforts of the local community and generations of West End children have been taught there. The place is important for its contribution to the educational development of West End and is a prominent community focal point and gathering place for social and commemorative events with widespread community support.
