= Vulture Street, Brisbane =

Street in Queensland, Australia

Vulture Street Queensland
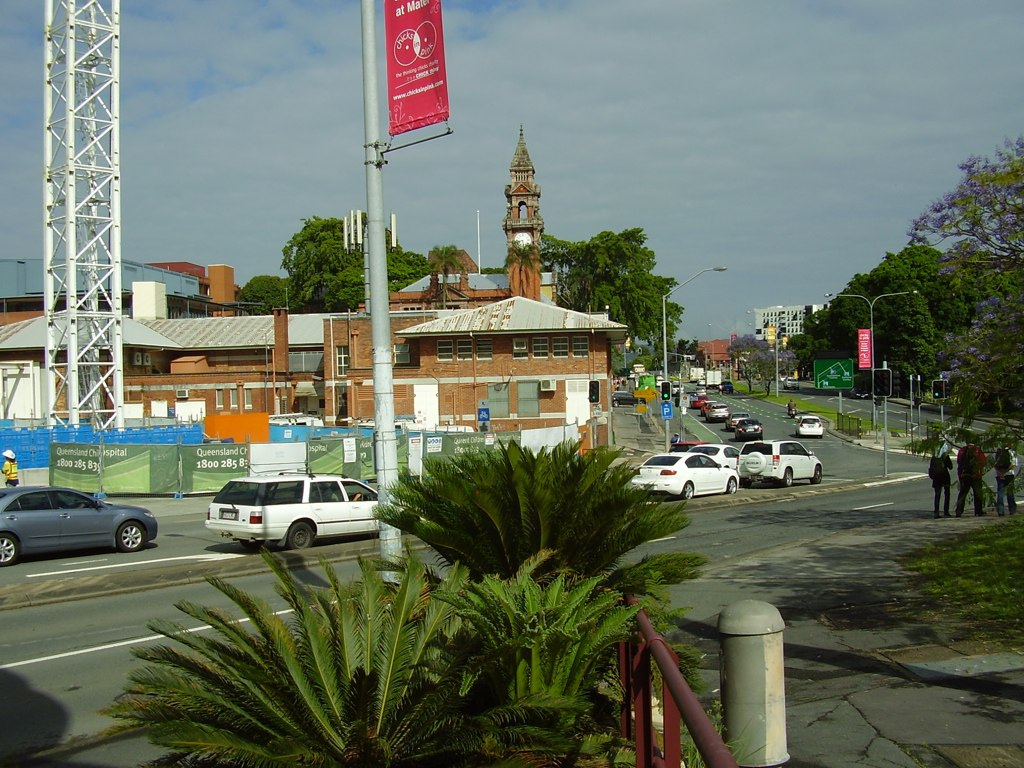
- Intersection of Stanley Street (left and center) and Vulture Street (right) before the construction of the new Queensland Children's Hospital

General information
- Type: Road
- Length: 4.5 km (2.8 mi)
- Route number(s): State Route 10 (Stanley St–Cordelia St); State Route 41 (Dock St, South Brisbane–Vulture St E, East Brisbane)

Major junctions
- West end: Montague Road West End, near Davies Park
- East end: Vulture Street East (State Route 41), East Brisbane, near the Gabba

Location(s)
- LGA(s): City of Brisbane
- Major suburbs: West End, South Brisbane, Woolloongabba, East Brisbane

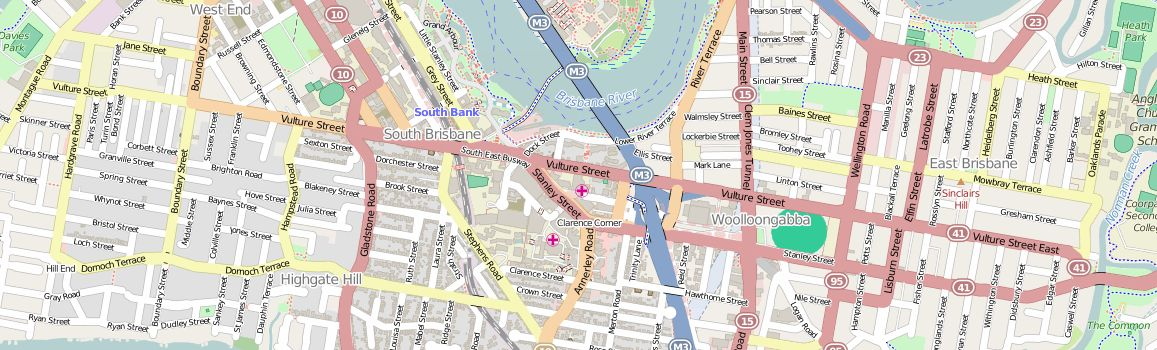
OpenStreetMap - Vulture Street, 2015

Vulture Street is a road in Brisbane, Queensland, Australia. It connects the inner southern suburbs. Its eastern segment is known as Vulture Street East.

== Geography ==
Vulture Street commences at a junction with Montague Road, West End (27.4801°S 153.0052°E) and then travels east through West End, South Brisbane, Kangaroo Point and East Brisbane, where it terminates at a junction at Stanley Terrace (27.4870°S 153.0501°E) being unable to go further east due to Norman Creek. It is known as Vulture Street East from east of the intersection with Wellington Road in East Brisbane. It is 4.5 kilometres (2.8 mi) long.

== Significant landmarks and junctions ==
Vulture Street has a number of significant landmarks and junctions, including (from west to east):

- 24: West End State School
- 150: Brisbane State High School

intersection with Gladstone Road and Ernest Street

- 160: St Andrews Anglican Church

overbridge across the Beenleigh and Cleveland railway lines

- 253: Somerville House
- South Brisbane Memorial Park
- 263: South Brisbane Town Hall (now owned by Somerville House)

intersection with Stanley Street

- former South Brisbane Library
- Mater Private Hospital

overbridge across the Pacific Motorway

- 330: St Nicholas Russian Orthodox Cathedral

intersection with Main Street

- The Brisbane Cricket Ground, more commonly known as the Gabba
- East Brisbane State School

intersection with Wellington Road (becomes Vulture Street East)

- 554: St Paul's Anglican Church

== Major intersections ==
The entire road is in the Brisbane local government area.

Location	km	mi	Destinations	Notes
West End	0	0.0	Montague Road – north – South Brisbane / south – East Brisbane	Western end of Vulture Street
West End	0.7	0.43	Boundary Street – north – South Brisbane / south – Highgate Hill	
South Brisbane	1.5	0.93	Cordelia Street (State Route 10) – north – South Brisbane	Western concurrency terminus with State Route 10.
South Brisbane	1.6	0.99	Merivale Street (State Route 10) – north – South Brisbane	No access westbound from Merivale Street
South Brisbane	2.1	1.3	Stanley Street (State Route 10), (State Route 41) – south-east – Woolloongabba / Dock Street – north – Kangaroo Point Cliffs / Graham Street – south-west – Queensland Children's Hospital	Eastern concurrency terminus with State Route 10, Western terminus of State Route 41.
Woolloongabba – Kangaroo Point boundary	2.6– 2.9	1.6– 1.8	Pacific Motorway — north-west – Brisbane City / south-east – Greenslopes	Exit only to Vulture Street eastbound from Pacific Motorway southbound
Woolloongabba – Kangaroo Point boundary	3.1	1.9	Main Street (State Route 15) – north – Kangaroo Point / south – Annerley	
Woolloongabba – East Brisbane boundary	3.5	2.2	Vulture Street East (State Route 41) – east – East Brisbane / Wellington Road – north – East Brisbane / south – Stones Corner	Eastern end of Vulture Street.
1.000 mi = 1.609 km; 1.000 km = 0.621 mi: Concurrency terminus; Incomplete access

== In popular culture ==
The rock band Powderfinger produced an album Vulture Street which was named after the band's first recording studio in Vulture Street, West End.
