= Cairncross Dockyard =

Australian shipyard in Brisbane, Queensland (1944–2014)

Coordinates: 27.4485°S 153.0766°E

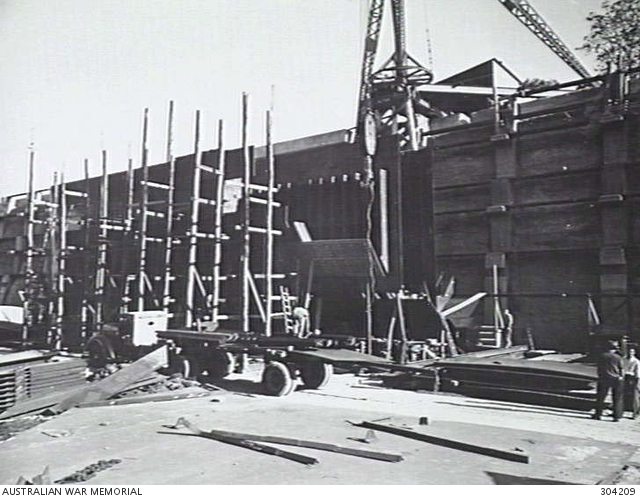
Dock gate under construction, circa 1942

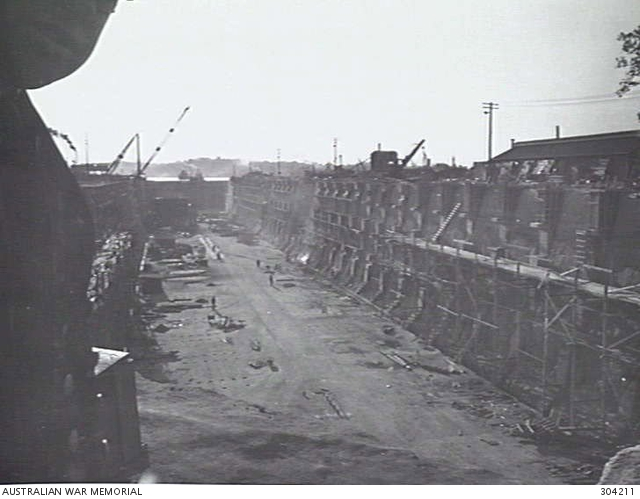
Looking towards the entrance during drydock construction, circa 1942

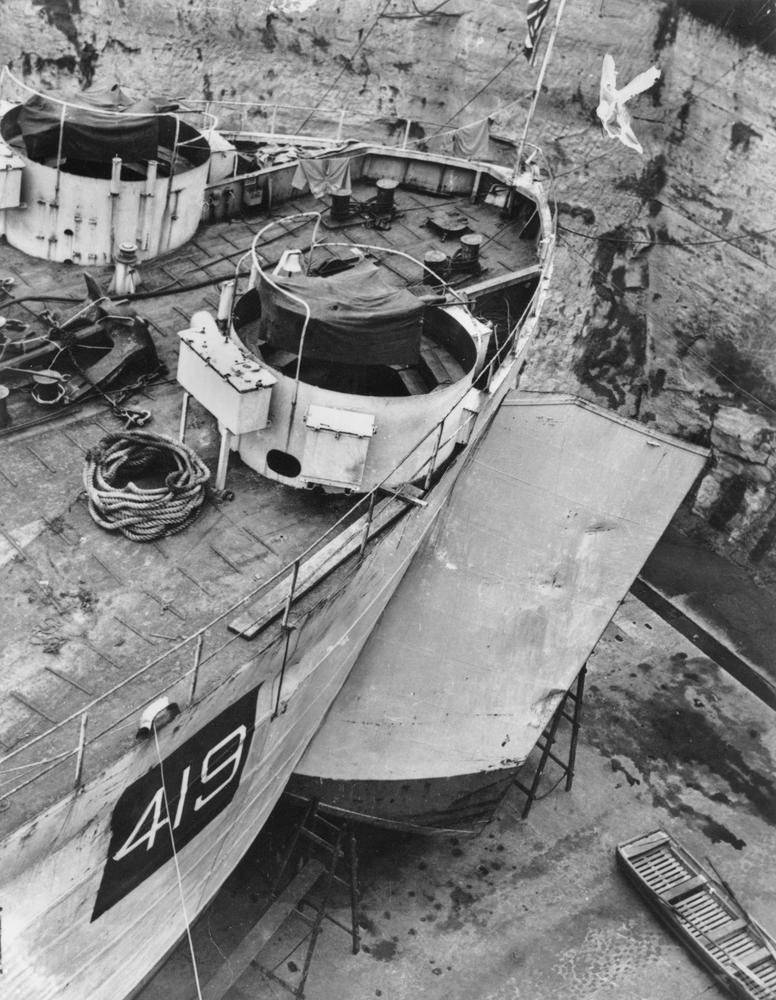
HMS LST-419 in Cairncross Dock, Brisbane, ca. 1943

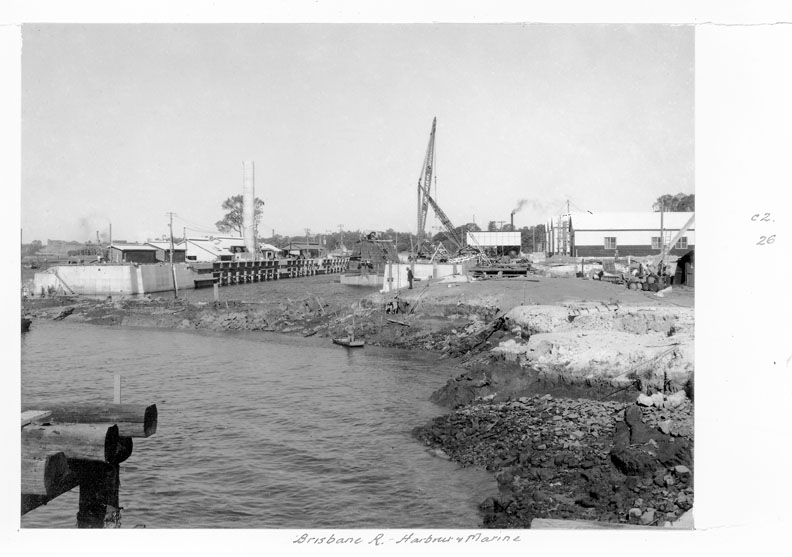
Cairncross Dock, 1949

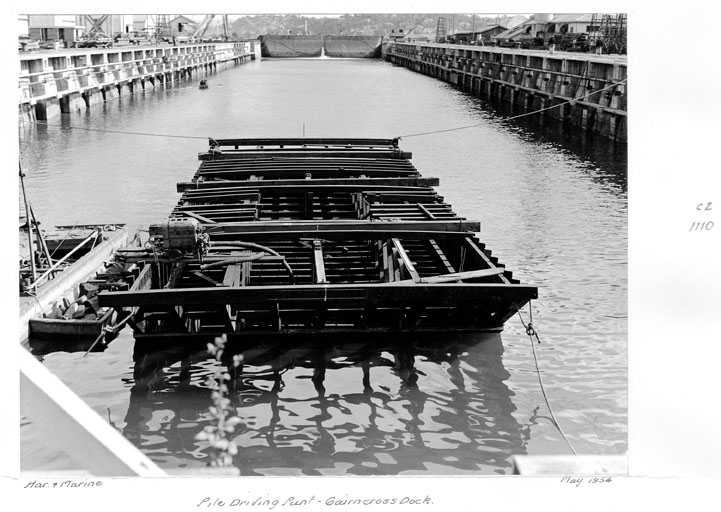
Cairncross Dock, May 1954

The Cairncross Dockyard was a shipyard beside the Brisbane River at 405 Thynne Road, Morningside, City of Brisbane, Queensland, Australia. It included one of Australia's largest graving docks with an 8.5 metre deep water access, capable of taking Panamax vessels of up to 85,000 dwt, up to 263 metres long x 33.5 metres wide. It is second in size only to the Royal Australian Navy's Captain Cook Graving Dock in Sydney.

Construction of the dockyard began in 1942, and its graving dock opened in 1944. The dockyard closed in 2014, and the land on which it stands is to be sold for residential and commercial redevelopment.

== History ==
The bombing of Darwin in February 1942 during World War II created an urgent need to increase Australia's capacity to service large naval and merchant ships. The South Brisbane dockyards (built in the 1880s) were too small to accommodate many modern ships plus the construction of the Story Bridge impacted on the access to that dockyard. A larger dockyard downstream of the Story Bridge was needed and an area near Thynne Road, Morningside on the Hamilton Reach was chosen. Although the name was to be the Brisbane Graving Dock, the site of the dockyard was on top of the riverside feature, the Cairncross Rocks, and so it acquired the name Cairncross. Cairncross Rocks in turn were named after one of Brisbane's pioneer businessmen Willam Cairncross who built Colmslie House in Bulimba.

The Queensland Government commenced a project to construct what became the Cairncross Dockyard in August 1942. The Commonwealth Government provided funding for the project shortly afterwards, and it became one of the Allied Works Council's highest-priority projects. The total cost of the dockyard was £1,070,470, of which the Commonwealth Government contributed £425,000 and the Queensland Government the remainder.

Construction of the Brisbane Graving Dock commenced in September 1942 with workers and equipment redeployed from the Somerset Dam project. The project was led by the Queensland Government's Main Roads Commission and Department of Harbours and Marine Works on behalf of the Allied Works Council. A total of 800 workers were employed on the site, with the workforce being organised into three eight hour shifts to accelerate construction.

The first ship entered the dockyard on 22 June 1944. The official history of Australia in World War II states that while the dockyard was "constructed at a remarkable rate", by the time it was ready the peak demand for ship repair facilities had passed. Nevertheless, by 31 May 1946 the graving dock had been used by 128 ships, including the British aircraft carriers HMS Slinger and Unicorn as well as large numbers of other warships and merchant vessels. The opening of the Cairncross Dockyard led to a decline in use of the smaller South Brisbane Dry Dock, which eventually closed in 1972 and became part of the Queensland Maritime Museum.

Although owned by the Queensland Government, the Australian Government controlled its use until after World War II. A major refurbishment of the dockyard occurred in the 1970s. However, frequent industrial action at the dockyard caused many large ships to be out of service far longer than needed and large ship owners became reluctant to use the dockyard. This was a major factor in the dockyard being unprofitable, leading to its closure in 1987.

In August 1995, the dock was re-opened by a private consortion, the Keppel Cairnscross Shipyard Limited, who undertook a major refurbishment. In 2000 it was purchased by Forgacs Groups. However, the dockyard closed again on 4 July 2014, saying there was not enough work as ship owners were deterred from using it due to the high Australian dollar and a reputation for industrial unrest and government over-regulation.

In April 2016, Forgacs announced that the 14-hectare (35-acre) site with 700 metres (2,300 ft) of river frontage would be sold for residential housing, although it would need to rezoned first. Forgacs attributed the sale to their contract to build destroyers coming to an end.

In 2022, there was an attempt to have the dockyard listed on the Queensland Heritage Register. In June 2023, the Queensland Heritage Council declined to list the dockyard on the heritage register and the site was then offered for sale as an industrial estate.

== Engineering heritage ==
The graving dock received a Historic Engineering Marker from Engineers Australia as part of its Engineering Heritage Recognition Program.
