= South Brisbane (disambiguation) =

South Brisbane may refer to:

- South Brisbane, a suburb in Brisbane, Australia
- South Brisbane Cemetery, a cemetery in Brisbane
- South Brisbane Dry Dock, a dry dock in Brisbane
- South Brisbane Library, a heritage-listed former library in South Brisbane
- South Brisbane Football Club, football club in Brisbane
- South Brisbane railway station, a railway station in South Brisbane
- South Brisbane Reach of the Brisbane River
- South Brisbane Town Hall, a former town hall
- City of South Brisbane, a former local government area in Queensland
- Electoral district of South Brisbane, an electoral district of the Queensland Legislative Assembly
- Electoral district of Town of South Brisbane, a former electoral district of the Queensland Legislative Assembly
