= South Brisbane Railway Easement =

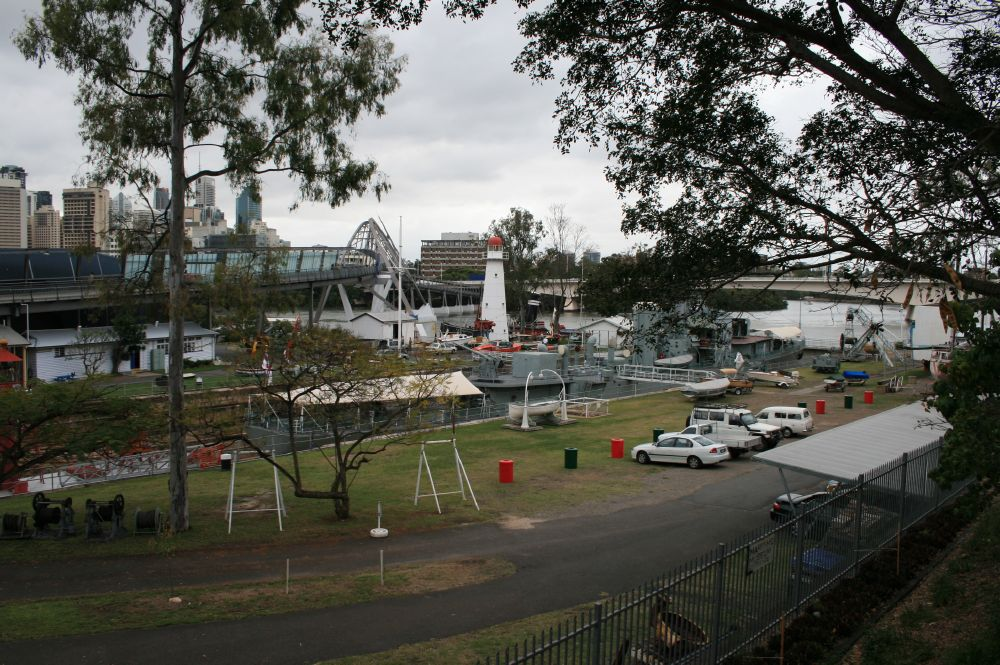
- South Brisbane Railway Easement, 2008

- Location within Queensland Location within Australia
- 27.4819°S 153.0267°E
- Location: 412 Stanley Street, South Brisbane, Queensland, Australia

History
- Design period: 1870s–1890s (late 19th century)
- Built: 1882–1897

Queensland Heritage Register
- Official name: South Brisbane Railway Easement, Dry Dock Siding, South Brisbane Wharves Extension, Stanley Street Terminus
- Type: state heritage (built, archaeological)
- Designated: 21 October 1992
- Reference no.: 600293
- Significant period: 1880s, 1890s (fabric); 1884–1891 (historical use of Stanley Street Station), 1897–1969 (historical)
- Significant components: wall/s – retaining, abutments – railway bridge, formation – railway

The South Brisbane Railway Easement is the heritage-listed remnants of a former railway branch line and siding at 412 Stanley Street, South Brisbane, Queensland, Australia. It was built from 1882 to 1897. It is also known as Dry Dock Siding, South Brisbane Wharves Extension, and Stanley Street Terminus. It was added to the Queensland Heritage Register on 21 October 1992.

== History ==
The first South Brisbane railway was constructed from South Brisbane Junction (now Corinda railway station) to Stanley Street in 1882–84.

It was the outcome of late 1870s agitation by commercial interests, in particular West Moreton coal owners, for a link from the Ipswich line to deep water anchorage at South Brisbane. As approved by Queensland Parliament in 1881, the principal railyards were to be established at the water reserve at Woolloongabba, with a passenger line extension along Stanley Street terminating opposite the South Brisbane Dry Dock.

Public opposition prevented the railway being run along Stanley Street. Instead, a branch line was constructed from the Woolloongabba railyards through a single-bore tunnel under Vulture Street to the river bank, then continued west to terminate just below Stanley Street. At the river a major coal wharf and sidings, which extended to the dry dock, were constructed.

The contract for the main line to Stanley Street was let to Gilliver & Wockner in January 1882, but by May they were unable to continue the work and construction was taken over by the Railways Department.

Acheson Overend & Co. were the successful tenderers for the coal wharf and sidings, with a contract price of £11,830. The tender was accepted in December 1882 and work was completed by early May 1884.

The South Brisbane line, coal wharf and sidings were opened on 2 June 1884, with passenger trains departing from the Stanley Street terminus three times daily except Sundays. This number doubled within the year.

Although the station at Stanley Street catered only for passenger traffic, every train arriving had to be pushed back to Woolloongabba before another could use the line. The station's ability to handle increased traffic was minimal, and when the Melbourne Street extension and passenger terminal was opened on 21 December 1891, the Stanley Street station was closed.

In 1894 parliament authorised the extension of the dry dock siding as far as the Victoria Bridge, to service the wharves and commercial enterprises along the river bank at South Brisbane. The contract was let to Kirk Brothers & Frew in May 1896, and the line was opened on 30 March 1897.

The wharves extension served a host of major businesses until late 1969, by which time the demise of South Brisbane as a commercial and port facility forced its closure.

== Description ==
Included in this listing are:

- Former Stanley Street station platform (1883–84): Stanley Street station initially consisted of a single raised timber platform 305 feet (93 m) long on the southern side of the line, overlooking the dry dock. A timber station building 86 feet (26 m) long and 12 feet (3.7 m) wide was constructed by Worley and Whitehead in April 1884, but was removed in the 20th century. Remnant timber edgings to the station platform lie buried beneath infill.
- Stanley Street retaining wall (1880s): Constructed of rough dressed freestone, the retaining wall effectively terminated the South Brisbane line. It runs along the northern side of Stanley Street above the former South Brisbane station and part of the dry dock reserve. Sections of the attached cast-iron fence remain, but the entry gates to the station have been removed.
- Retaining walls (1883–85): Also constructed of rough dressed freestone, these retaining walls form the current southeastern and western boundaries of the dry dock, and were erected between 1883 and 1885. The southeastern wall appears to have been associated with the construction of the rail line to Stanley Street. Sections of this are rendered. Above this wall lies the path of the former South Brisbane line; below was the dry dock siding.
- Paths of the former Stanley Street branch line (1882–83), dry dock siding (1882–84) and South Brisbane wharves extension (1896–97). Although the tracks have been removed, the paths and gradients remain. That of the 1896–97 extension of the dry dock siding has been asphalted.
- Former railway overbridge at Sidon Street (1896–97): Constructed as part of the extension of the dry dock siding to the South Brisbane wharves, the overbridge necessitated cutting through the western retaining wall of the dry dock reserve and across Sidon Street. It was built of timber, wrought-iron, galvanised iron sheeting and cement concrete. The concrete abutments on the eastern side of what was formerly Sidon Street remain, but the overbridge is no longer visible and the cutting has been filled in.

== Heritage listing ==
South Brisbane Railway Easement was listed on the Queensland Heritage Register on 21 October 1992 having satisfied the following criteria.

The place is important in demonstrating the evolution or pattern of Queensland's history.

The South Brisbane Railway Easement, constructed in 1882–84, is significant historically as a collection of remnant structures and sites associated with South Brisbane's earliest rail network, constructed in the early 1880s. The place is important for its strong association with the commercial development of South Brisbane in the 1880s and 1890s. The South Brisbane Railway Easement is an integral element in the historic precinct centred on the South Brisbane Memorial Park, which includes the dry dock (Queensland Maritime Museum), the former South Brisbane Library, Cumbooquepa (Somerville House), the former South Brisbane Town Hall and Ship Inn.

The place has potential to yield information that will contribute to an understanding of Queensland's history.

There is also potential to reveal sub-surface archaeological evidence.
