= Forceful (tugboat) =

Australian tugboat

Coordinates: 27°28′52.82″S 153°01′36.97″E

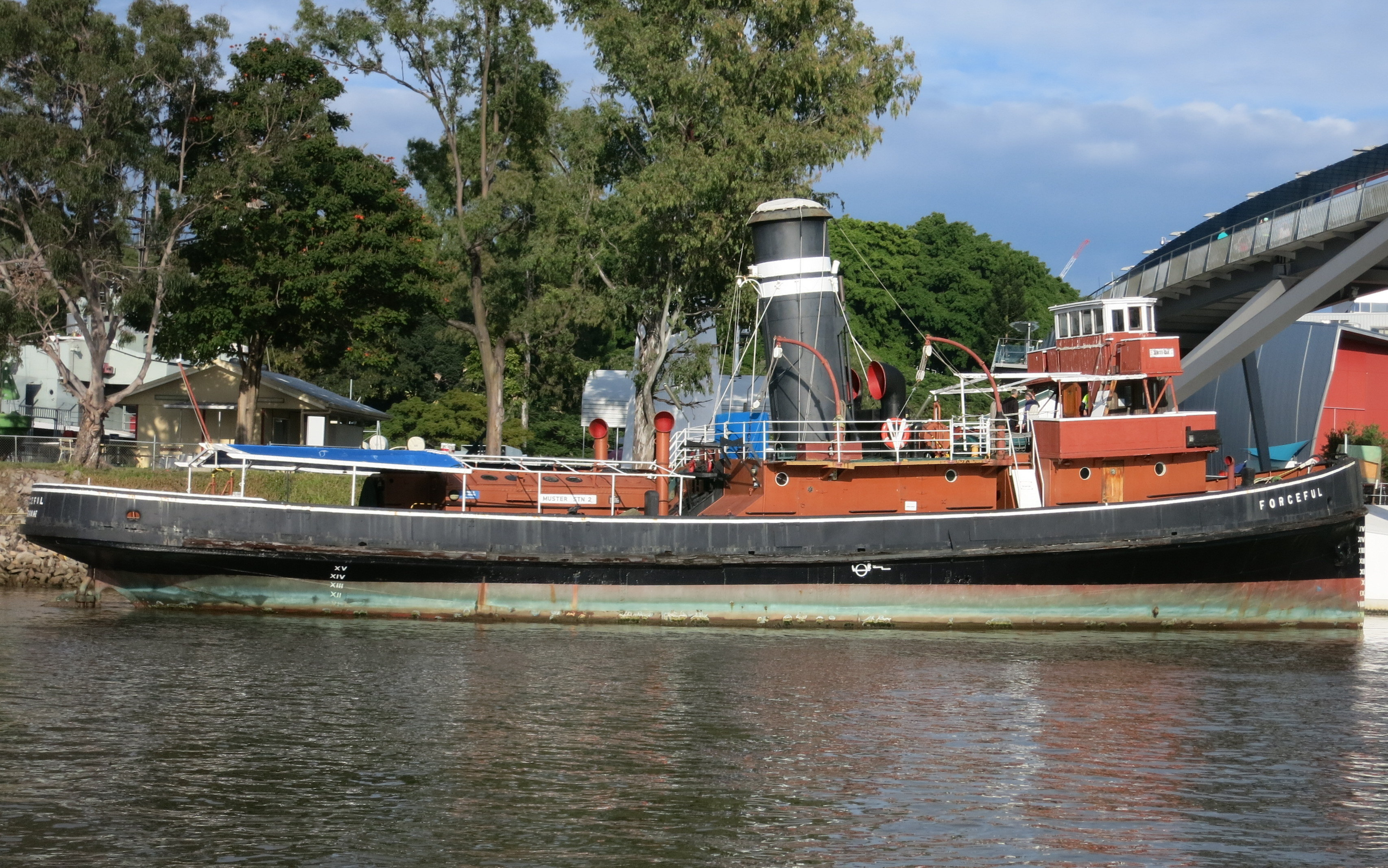
- Forceful docked at the Queensland Maritime Museum in 2015

History

Australia
- Operator: Queensland Tug Company
- Builder: Alexander Stephen & Sons, Govan, Scotland
- Yard number: 509
- Launched: 20 November 1925
- In service: 7 March 1926
- Out of service: 1942
- Homeport: Brisbane
- Fate: Requisitioned by Royal Australian Navy

Australia
- Commissioned: 16 February 1942
- Decommissioned: 11 October 1943
- Honours and awards: Battle honours: Darwin 1942-1943; Pacific 1941-43
- Fate: Returned to civilian owners

Australia
- In service: 1943
- Out of service: 28 September 1970
- Homeport: Brisbane
- Identification: IMO number: 5117559
- Fate: Scrapped

General characteristics
- Tonnage: 288 gross tons
- Length: 36.88 m (121.0 ft)
- Beam: 8.26 m (27.1 ft)
- Draught: 4.08 m (13.4 ft)
- Propulsion: 1 triple expansion steam engine with 3 cylinders, 2 single ended boilers each with 2 furnaces, 1050 IHP
- Speed: 13 knots (24 km/h; 15 mph)
- Armament: One Oerlikon 20 mm cannon, one Vickers machine gun (RAN service only)

Forceful was a sea-going tugboat built for the Queensland Tug Company by Alexander Stephen & Sons in Govan, Scotland in 1925. She worked at her homeport of Brisbane, Australia between 1926 and 1970 berthing ships and assisting nearby casualties. During World War II she was commissioned into the Royal Australian Navy in early 1942 as HMAS Forceful (W126), based at Fremantle and Darwin, until returning to commercial service in October 1943. She was preserved as a museum ship until 2023 when scrapped.

== Construction and commercial service ==
Forceful was built in 1925 by Alexander Stephen & Sons in Govan, Scotland as their yard number 509 for the Queensland Tug Company's operations at Brisbane, Queensland, Australia. She is a steel-hulled steam tug of 245 GRT, with dimensions of 36.88 m (121.0 ft) length, 8.26 m (27.1 ft) and 4.08 m (13.4 ft) depth. Her steam engine, also made by the shipbuilder, is of triple-expansion type producing 1050 ihp and powering a single screw. The engine is fed by two single-ended coal-fired boilers each with 2 furnaces.

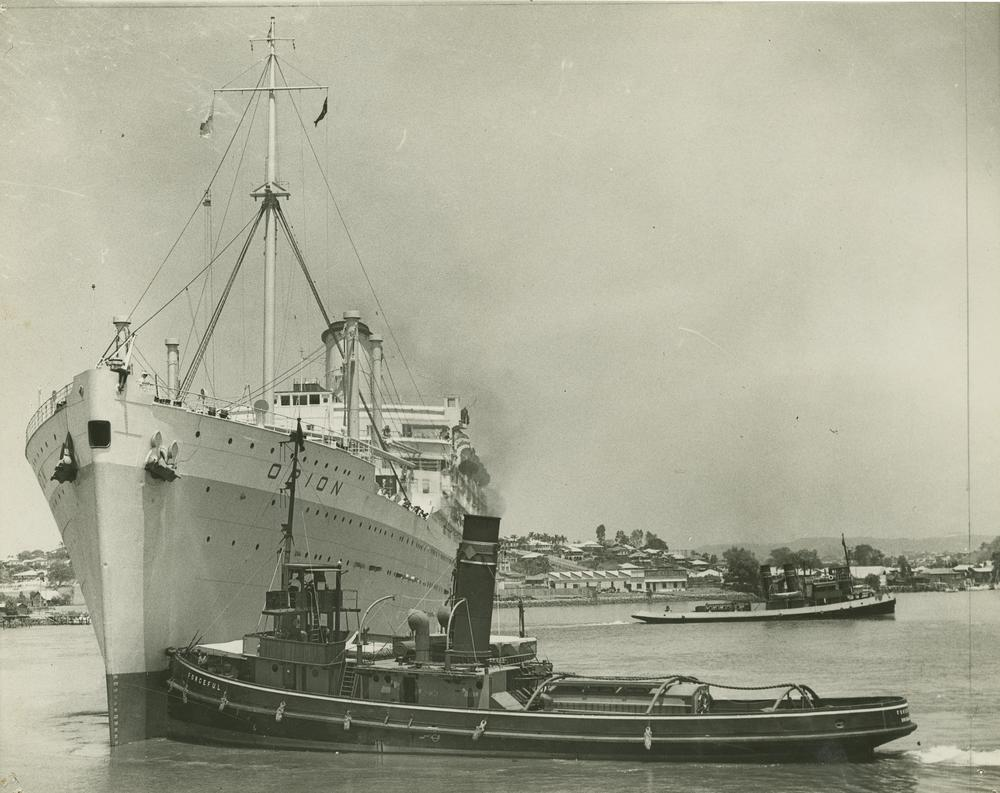
Forceful at Brisbane assisting passenger liner RMS Orion

The tug was launched on 20 November 1925 and sailed from the River Clyde on 21 December, reaching Brisbane on 7 March 1926. After voyage repairs, she was registered at Brisbane on 31 March 1926 with Official Number 139366 and entered service in the Port of Brisbane. In addition to her regular ship-berthing duties, she was deployed as required as a salvage tug on the Queensland coast. After her naval requisition in World War II she resumed her service at Brisbane but in due course was overtaken by newer technology; by 1964 she was the last coal-burning steam tug on the River Brisbane. On 28 September 1970 she was retired from service and laid up.

== Naval service ==
On 4 December 1941 Forceful was chartered by the British Ministry of War Transport for service in the Mediterranean Sea as a salvage tug. After reaching Fremantle on 14 January, the charter was rescinded as the tug was required for service with the Royal Australian Navy. She was briefly an examination vessel before being requisitioned, and then commissioned as HMAS Forceful (pennant W126) on 16 February 1942. She was initially attached to HMAS Leeuwin, the naval base at Fremantle, for general harbour and towing duties.

In October 1942 Forceful was transferred to the naval base HMAS Melville, at Darwin, Northern Territory as a harbour and salvage tug. During her war service she was based at Darwin. She operated there during a period when Darwin received repeated Japanese air attacks. On 4 November the tug rescued the crew of an American B-26 bomber which had ditched west of Bathurst Island after a raid on Dili and in 1943 regularly took up salvage readiness at sea in support of naval destroyers during Australian irregular military operations in Timor. In April and May 1943 Forceful was based at Thursday Island in support of the strengthening of allied facilities at Merauke, New Guinea.

In August 1943 the tug returned from Darwin to Brisbane, where she was required as a harbour tug to assist the vastly increased volume of shipping. She was decommissioned from the RAN on 11 October 1943 and returned to her owners. HMAS Forceful received two battle honours for her wartime service: "Darwin 1942-43" and "Pacific 1943".

== Museum ship ==
Forceful was retired from service in September 1970 and was handed over to the Queensland Maritime Museum in Brisbane on 10 June 1971. The vessel was kept operational and used for trips along the Brisbane River and to Moreton Bay until 2006, when a hull survey revealed that the tugboat was not safe to operate, and required extensive repairs. Despite further attention, in June 2012 Forceful was at risk of being condemned for scrap as a small leak had developed in the vessels stern. Forceful was given a deadline to be out of the water and repaired by Maritime Safety Queensland (MSQ). Anonymous funding was received to facilitate the required repairs and she returned to the Queensland Maritime Museum in July 2012.

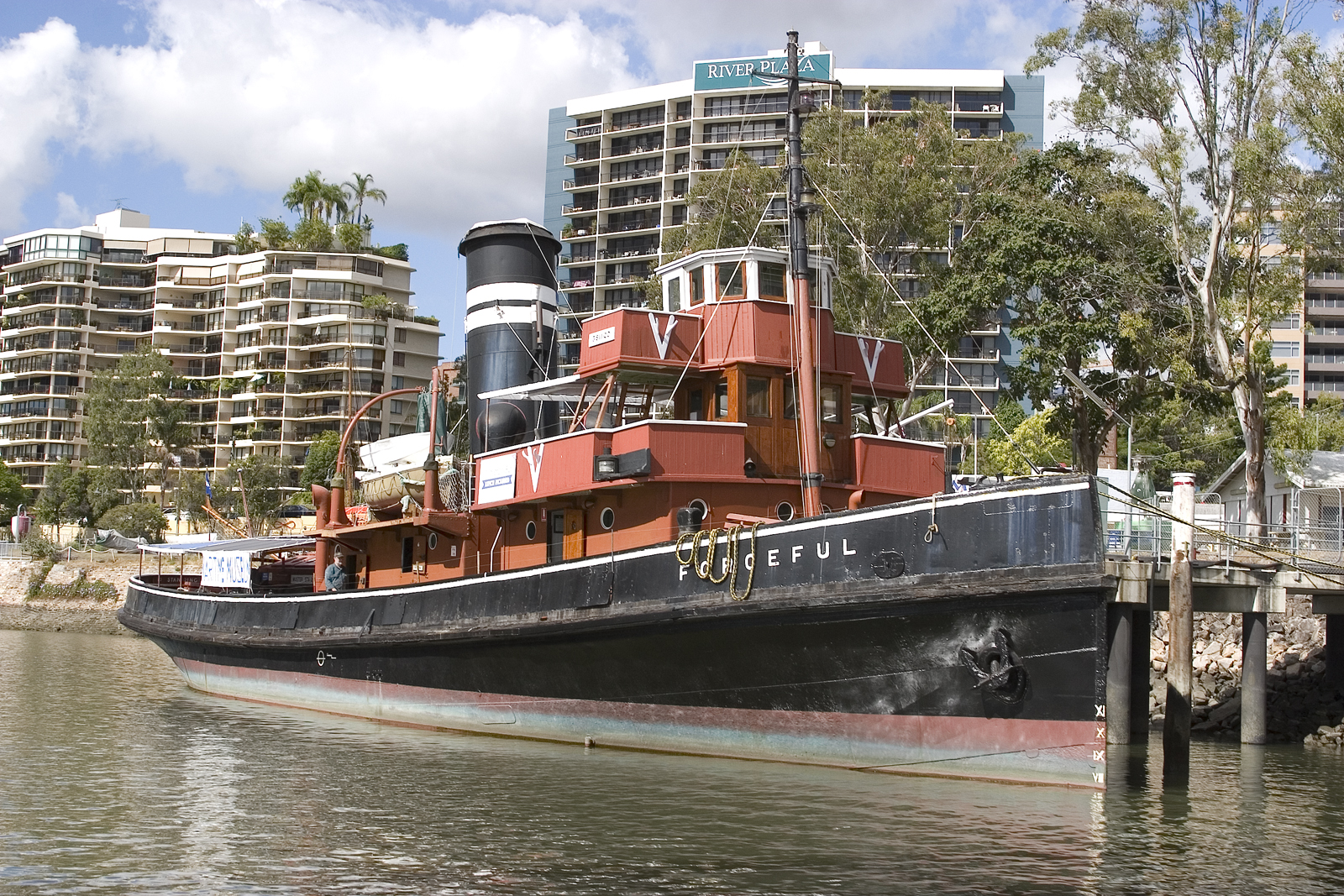
Forceful at the Queensland Maritime Museum in 2007

Following a number repairs to the vessel at the Brisbane slipway in order to preserve her in a safe condition, Forceful was maintained as a static exhibit at the museum.

In 2020 or 2021 Maritime Safety Queensland directed the Queensland Maritime Museum to remove Forceful from the water until she could be repaired. This was due to concerns that the ship posed a hazard in the event of flooding as a result of its poor material condition. Forceful was subsequently stored at The Yard in Murarrie. The museum sought to find a site where Forceful could be displayed, but was not successful. In May 2021 the Queensland Maritime Museum was seeking $350,000 in funding to repair Forceful and return her to the water. This formed part of an appeal for $700,000 in funding to keep the museum open.

In 2022, an interview with Captain Casper Kuiper, Chairman of the Queensland Maritime Museum, detailed the challenges faced by the Museum while struggling to find a home for the vessel.

In early 2023 the Queensland Maritime Museum Association concluded that it could no longer afford to retain Forceful. As a result, the association decided to seek proposals from companies to scrap the ship during April or May 2023.

Between September and November 2023, Forceful was scrapped.

== See also ==
- Forceful, Historic Naval Ships Association
