= HMAS Diamantina (K377) =

1944 River-class frigate

Coordinates: 27°28′55″S 153°1′36″E

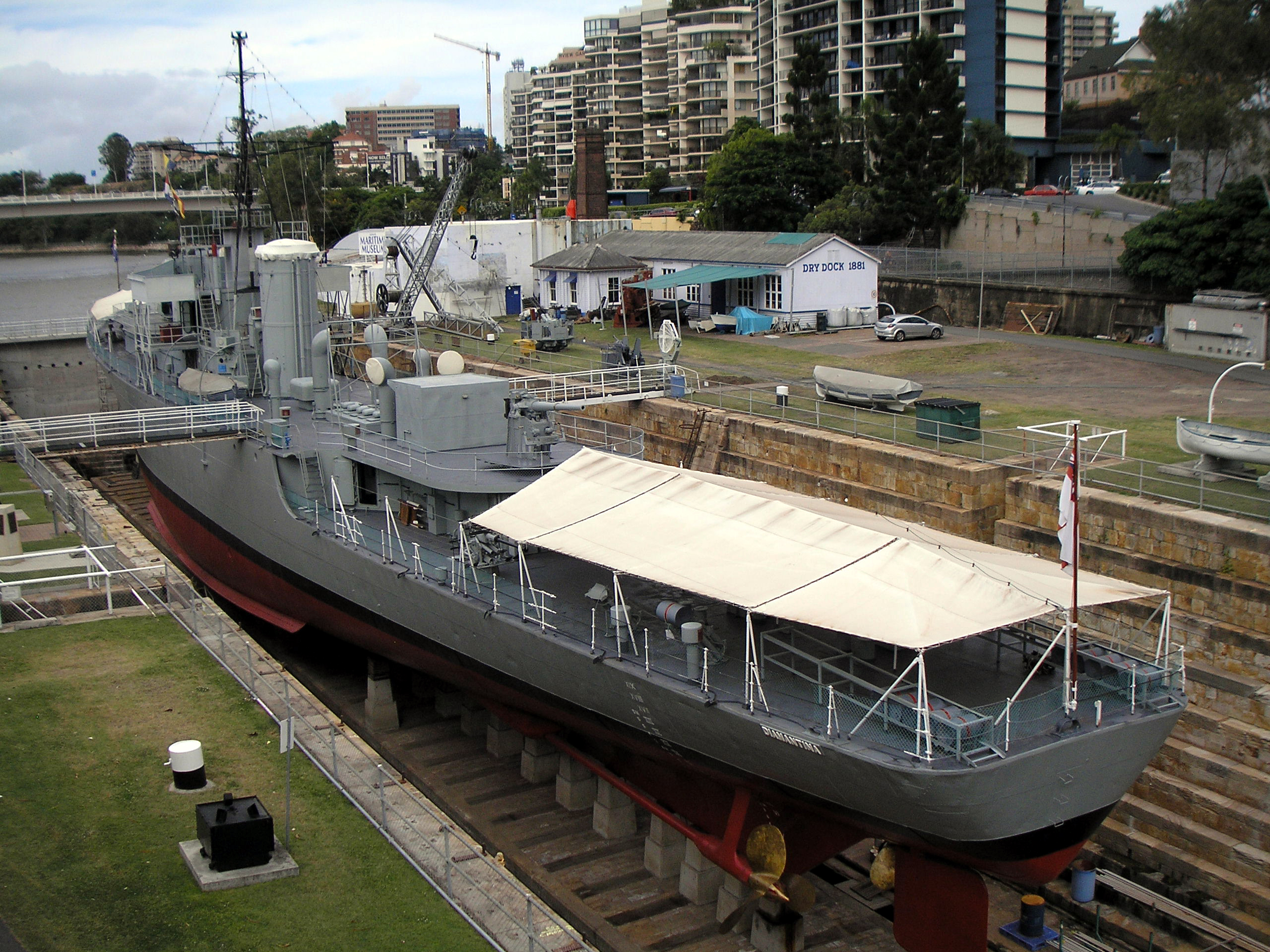
- HMAS Diamantina in the South Brisbane Dry Dock in 2008

History

Australia
- Name: Diamantina
- Namesake: Diamantina River
- Builder: Walkers Limited, Maryborough
- Laid down: 12 April 1943
- Launched: 6 April 1944
- Commissioned: 27 April 1945
- Decommissioned: 9 August 1946
- Recommissioned: 22 June 1959
- Decommissioned: 21 February 1980
- Motto: "Whoever Leads Protects"
- Honours and awards: Battle honours: Pacific 1945
- Status: Preserved as a museum ship at Queensland Maritime Museum
- Badge

General characteristics
- Class & type: River-class frigate
- Displacement: 1,420 long tons (1,440 t; 1,590 short tons); 2,020 long tons (2,050 t; 2,260 short tons) (deep load)
- Length: 283 ft (86.3 m) p/p; 301 ft 3 in (91.8 m) o/a
- Beam: 36 ft 6 in (11.1 m)
- Draught: 9 ft (2.7 m); 13 ft (4.0 m) (deep load)
- Propulsion: 2 × Admiralty 3-drum boilers, 2 shafts, reciprocating vertical triple expansion, 5,500 ihp (4,100 kW)
- Speed: 20 knots (37 km/h; 23 mph)
- Range: 500 long tons (510 t; 560 short tons) oil fuel; 5,180 nautical miles (9,590 km; 5,960 mi) at 12 knots (22 km/h; 14 mph)
- Complement: 140
- Armament: 2 × QF 4-inch (101.6 mm) Mk.XVI guns, single mounts HA/LA Mk.XX; 8 × QF 20 mm Oerlikon, single mounts Mk.III, later; 3 × QF 40 mm Bofors, single mounts Mk.VII; 4 × QF 20 mm Oerlikon, twin mounts Mk.V; 1 × Hedgehog 24 spigot A/S projector; up to 50 depth charges

HMAS Diamantina (K377/F377/A266/GOR266), named after the Diamantina River in Queensland, is a River-class frigate that served the Royal Australian Navy (RAN). Constructed in the mid-1940s, Diamantina was active from 1945 until 1946, was placed in reserve, then was recommissioned as a survey ship from 1959 until 1980.

Following her second decommissioning, the frigate was preserved at the Queensland Maritime Museum as a museum ship. She was the last World War II-era frigate to leave RAN service. Of the 151 River-class frigates constructed for 19 navies worldwide, Diamantina is one of only two preserved as a museum ship. (Note: The other is UBS Mayu, ex-HMS Fal, preserved in Myanmar.)

== Design and construction ==
Diamantina had a displacement of 2,120 tons fully loaded, or 1,420 standard displacement tons. She was equipped with two triple expansion engines driving twin screws at 5,500 indicated horsepower (4,100 kW). She had a range of 5,180 nautical miles (9,590 km; 5,960 mi) at 12 knots (22 km/h; 14 mph), with a top speed of 20 knots (37 km/h; 23 mph). She was armed with two single-mounted QF 4-inch (101.6 mm) Mk.XVI guns fore and aft and eight single-mounted QF 20 mm Oerlikons, although these were later replaced by three single-mounted QF 40 mm Bofors and four twin-mounted QF 20 mm Oerlikons. For anti-submarine warfare the ship was fitted with one Hedgehog 24 spigot A/S projector, and carried up to 50 depth charges. She had a complement of 140.

Diamantina was laid down on 12 April 1943 at Walkers Limited, Maryborough, launched on 6 April 1944, and commissioned at Hervey Bay on 27 April 1945. She was named for the Diamantina River in Queensland, and was one of eight River-class frigates built for the RAN during World War II.

== Operational history ==
=== 1945–1946 ===
After commissioning, Diamantina sailed to Sydney, remaining there until late May when she embarked for New Guinea to complete her trials. These were concluded in June 1945 and by the end of the month she proceeded from Madang to Cairns, and then to the Solomon Islands. After transporting several high-ranking officers to Saposa Island, Diamantina was committed to the Bougainville Campaign, providing fire support to the Australian Army units operating ashore in July and August 1945. Transiting through the Solomon Islands, on 7 July she shelled Sohana Island and then a week later provided counter-battery fire against Japanese positions on Taiof Island. At the conclusion of hostilities she returned to the Solomon Islands in early September. The frigate carried Lieutenant General Kanda and Vice Admiral Baron Samejima, officers of the Japanese Imperial High Command to the surrender of Torokina on 8 September 1945. She was also involved in the surrenders of Nauru on 13 September and Ocean Island on 1 October; both ceremonies conducted on her quarterdeck.

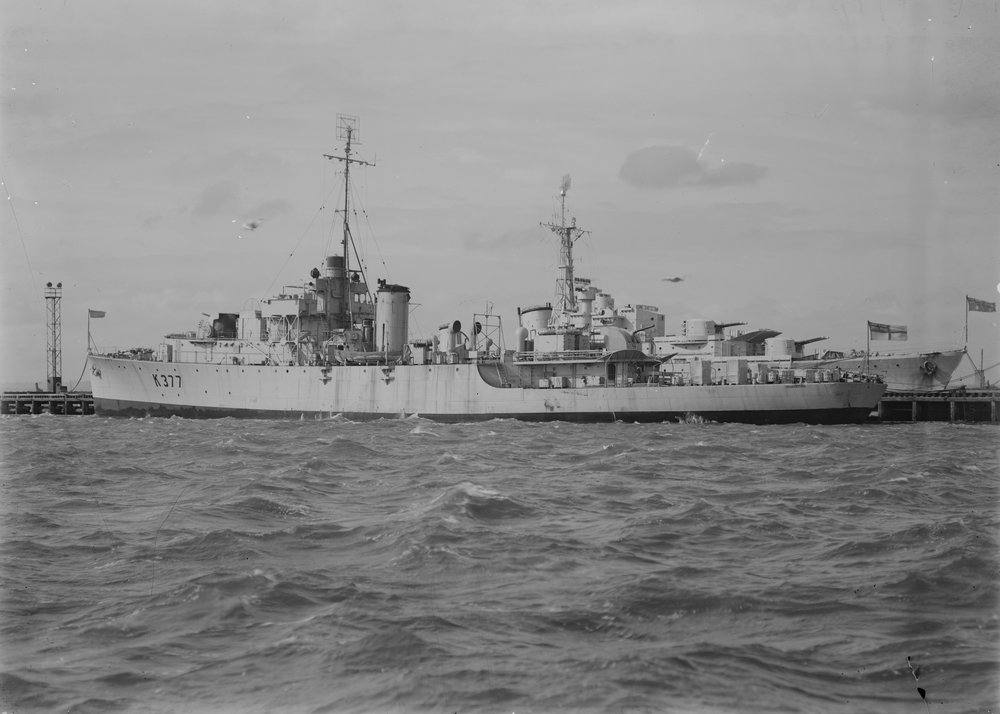
Diamantina berthed in Melbourne prior to her 1946 decommissioning

Diamantina returned to Sydney, arriving at Garden Island on 13 December 1945, with 78 passengers embarked. The ship remained in Sydney until 1 February 1946, when she departed for a patrol in New Guinea waters. Diamantina returned to Sydney in mid-June, and after sailing to Williamstown was paid off into reserve on 9 August 1946.

The ship was awarded the battle honour "Pacific 1945" for her wartime service.

=== 1959–1980 ===
Diamantina was recommissioned as an hydrographic, meteorological and oceanographic research vessel on 22 June 1959. She carried the pennant numbers F377, A266, and GOR266 at various points throughout this period of her career. After successfully completing her first oceanographic survey in July, she embarked on her first oceanographic cruise on 20 August. On 20 September, the ship performed the first survey of the Montebello Islands following the British atomic test, Operation Hurricane. On 22 October, Diamantina carried out the first survey of the waters around Christmas Island.

Diamantina's most notable achievement during her second commission was the discovery of the deepest known part of the Indian Ocean on 7 February 1960, which was named Diamantina Deep after the ship. Based in Fremantle, Diamantina remained in service as an oceanographic vessel until 1980; she briefly interrupted these duties in March 1963, escorting the royal yacht during Queen Elizabeth II's tour to Australia.

== Decommissioning and preservation ==
Diamantina paid off from the RAN on 29 February 1980, and was the last World War II-era frigate to serve Australia. Diamantina was handed over to the Queensland Maritime Museum to be permanently berthed in the South Brisbane Dry Dock located on the Brisbane River at South Brisbane. She was replaced in RAN service by HMAS Cook.

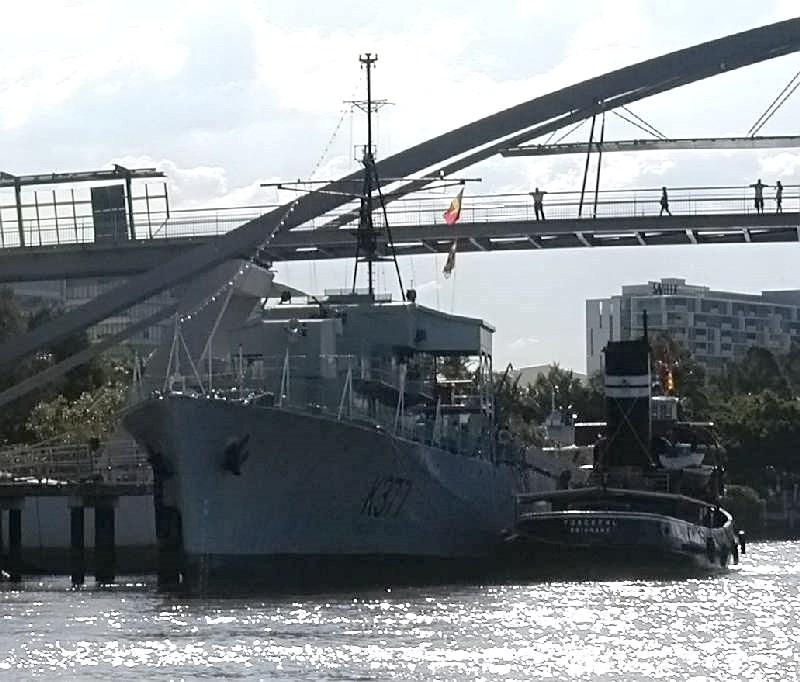
Diamantina afloat on the Brisbane River in 2006, during repairs to the drydock at the Queensland Maritime Museum

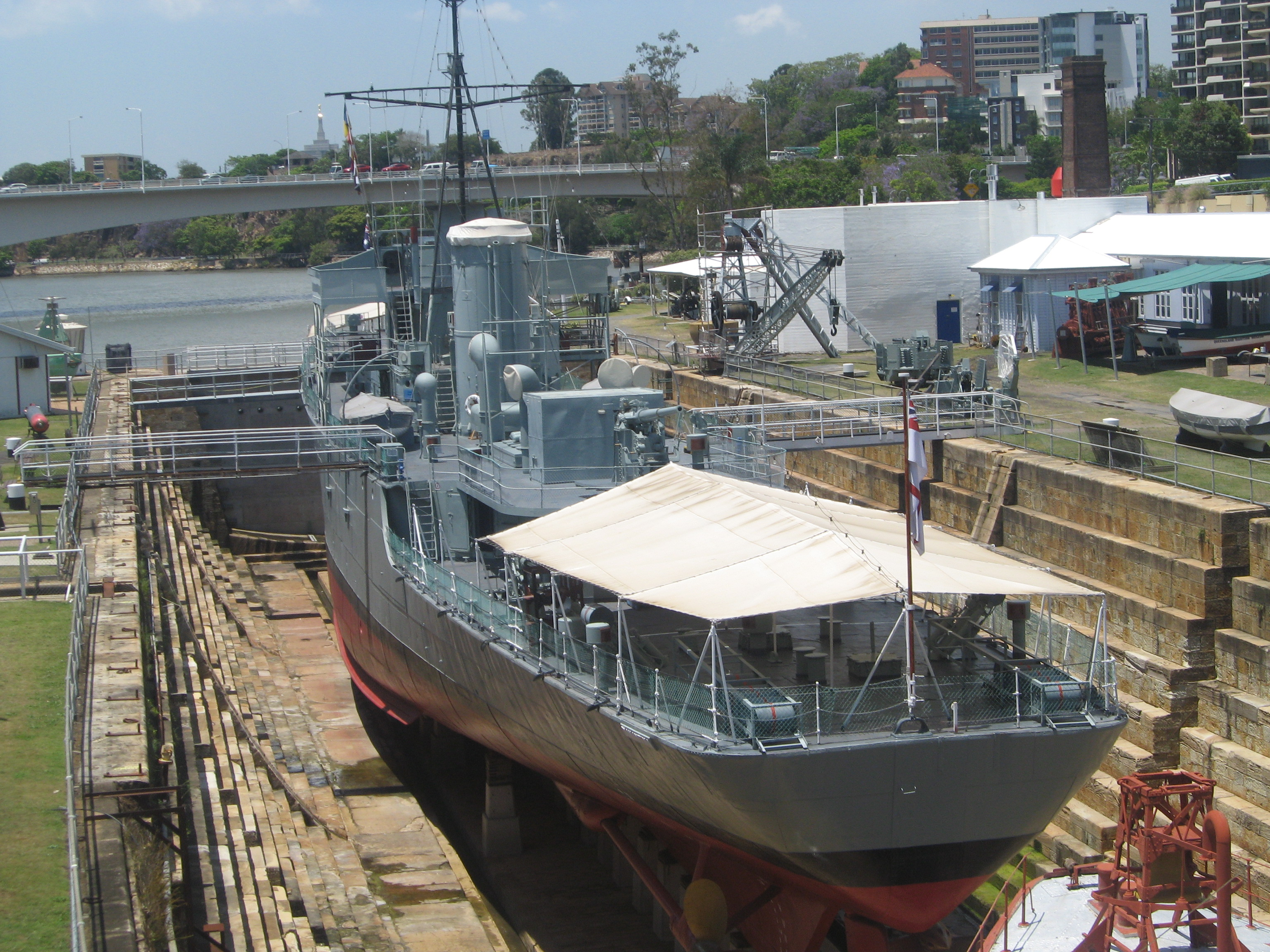
Rear view of the vessel

In March 2006, Diamantina left her berth for the first time in 25 years when she was towed out into the river to allow repairs to the dock, which had been flooded since the seals failed in 1998. On 10 May 2006, she returned to the South Brisbane Dry Dock adjacent to the Queensland Maritime Museum, where she was used as a self-touring museum ship. During the 2010–11 Queensland floods, the dry dock flooded but the ship had been maintained in good repair and floated up from the dry dock with the flood, while volunteers adjusted the ropes to prevent the ship bashing against the dry dock. The ship was undamaged.
