= South Brisbane Dry Dock =

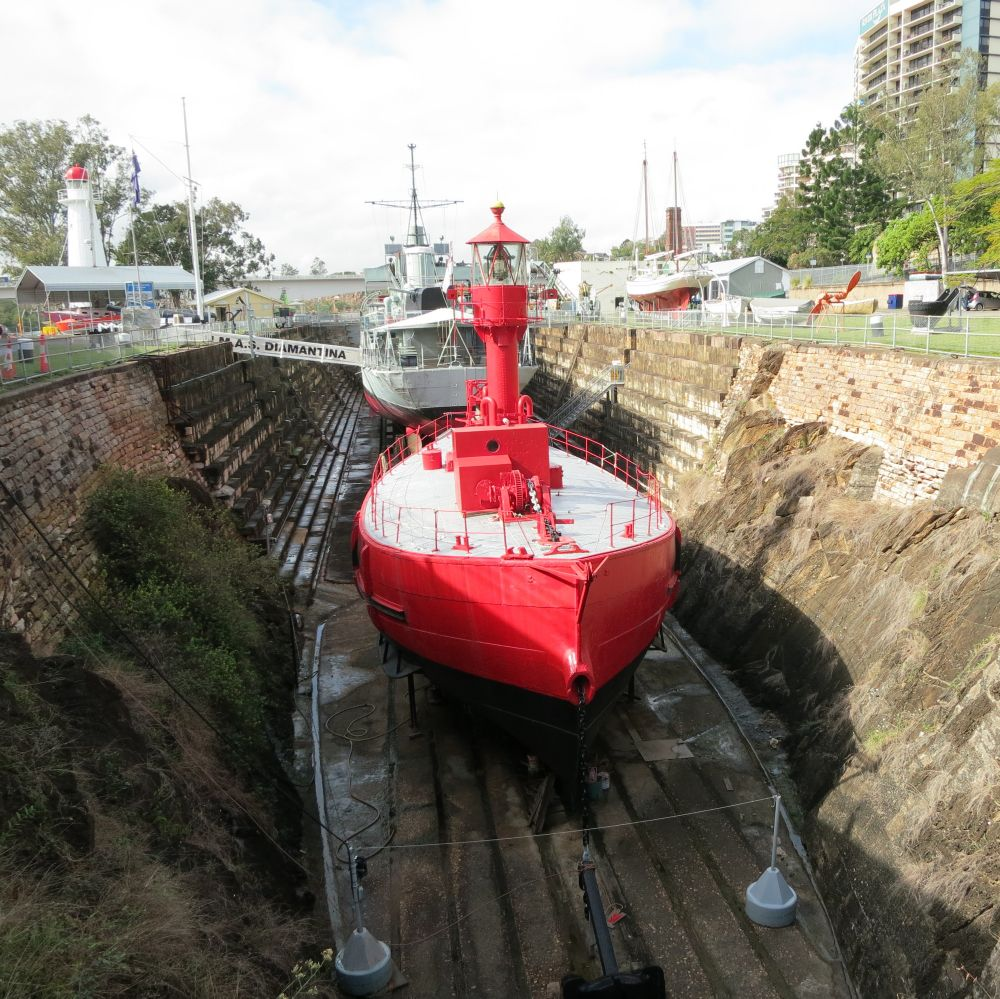
- South Brisbane Dry Dock, 2016

- Location within Queensland
- 27.4819°S 153.0267°E
- Location: 412 Stanley Street, South Brisbane, City of Brisbane, Queensland, Australia

History
- Design period: 1870s–1890s (late 19th century)
- Built: 1876–1887

Site notes
- Architect: William David Nisbet

Queensland Heritage Register
- Official name: South Brisbane Dry Dock, Government Graving Dock, Queensland Maritime Museum
- Type: state heritage (built, landscape)
- Designated: 21 October 1992
- Reference no.: 600301
- Significant period: 1876–1973 (historical)
- Significant components: crane / gantry, pump house, dry dock, shed/s, machinery/plant/equipment – maritime/marine industry, caisson, objects (movable) – marine/maritime industry

South Brisbane Dry Dock is a heritage-listed dry dock at 412 Stanley Street, South Brisbane, City of Brisbane, Queensland, Australia. It was designed by William David Nisbet and built from 1876 to 1887. It is also known as the Government Graving Dock. It was added to the Queensland Heritage Register on 21 October 1992.

The South Brisbane Dry Dock is the third oldest in Australia, the others being the Fitzroy Dry Dock, Cockatoo Island Dockyard, Sydney (1847–57) and the Alfred Graving Dock, Williamstown, Victoria (1864–73).

== History ==
The South Brisbane Dry Dock was designed by William David Nisbet, chief engineer for Harbours & Rivers, in 1875. It was constructed between 1876 and 1881 by J & A Overend, who had moved from Melbourne to oversee the work.

The busy Brisbane River port required a substantial facility for the maintenance, repair and refitting of commercial ships and Harbours & Rivers dredges, barges and other vessels.

In the first eighteen months the site was excavated and the excess material was used to build up streets in South Brisbane. The barque Doon was the first to utilise the dock, on 10 September 1881.

A store, carpenters shed, blacksmith shop and wharf were constructed. By 1887 it had been lengthened to 420 feet (130 m), as provided for in the original plans.

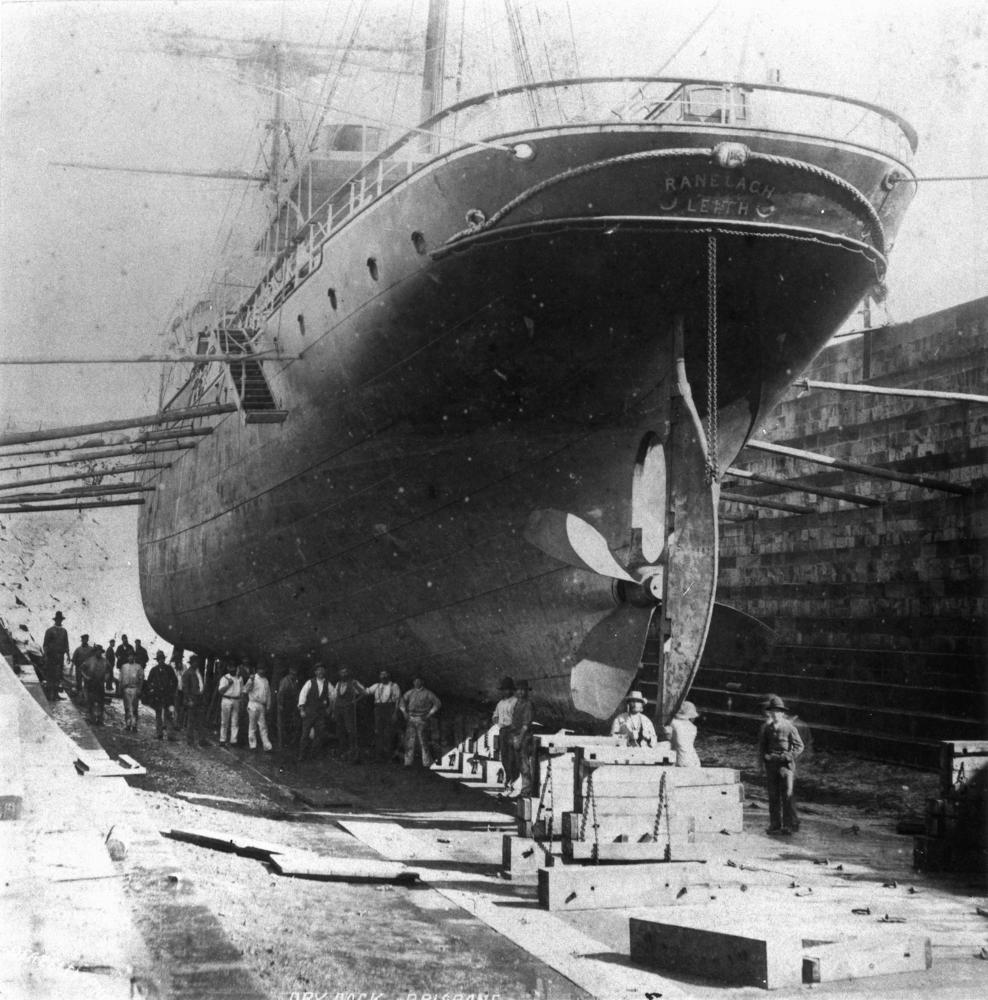
The ship Ranelagh in the dry dock

In the first twenty years an average of 60 vessels a year used the dry dock, the peak year being 1909 with 90 vessels. It was a profitable venture for the government until 1925 when patronage declined due to the increase in vessel size. A more substantial facility was provided during the Second World War when the Cairncross Dock was established downstream. Nevertheless the South Brisbane Dry Dock was extremely busy during the war, necessitating additional wharfage and facilities.

Though primarily a repair shop for Queensland government vessels, the South Brisbane Dry Dock remained viable for small government and commercial vessels.

Changes in shipyard practices, large bulk carriers, Captain Cook Bridge and the need for a major rehabilitation of the dock compelled the government to close the South Brisbane Dry Dock and transfer activities to an expanded Cairncross Dock.

Personnel, plant and equipment were removed and ownership of the site and buildings was transferred to the Land Administration Commission in 1973. Subsequently the Brisbane City Council have become trustees and the site is used as the Queensland Maritime Museum.

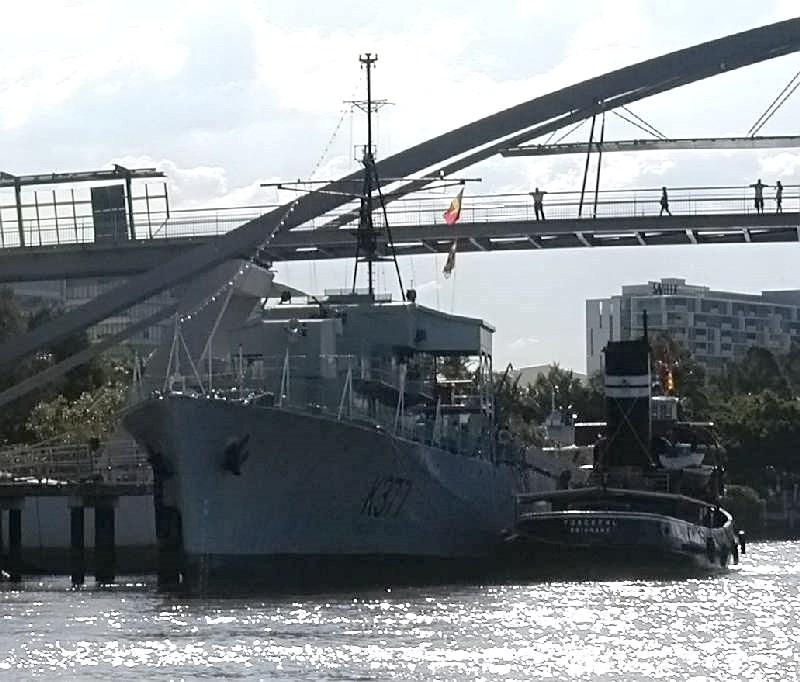
Diamantina afloat on the Brisbane River in 2006, during repairs to the drydock at the Queensland Maritime Museum

On 29 February 1980 HMAS Diamantina, the last World War II-era frigate to serve Australia, was decommissioned from the Royal Australian Navy. Diamantina was handed over to the Queensland Maritime Museum to be permanently berthed in the South Brisbane Dry Dock. In March 2006, Diamantina left her berth for the first time in 25 years when she was towed out into the river to allow repairs to the dock, which had been flooded since the seals failed in 1998. On 10 May 2006, she returned to the South Brisbane Dry Dock adjacent to the Queensland Maritime Museum, where she was used as a self-touring museum ship. During the 2010–2011 Queensland floods, the dry dock flooded but the ship had been maintained in good repair and floated up from the dry dock with the flood, while volunteers adjusted the ropes to prevent the ship bashing against the dry dock. The ship was undamaged.

== Description ==
The South Brisbane Dry Dock is opposite the former South Brisbane Municipal Chambers and adjacent to the former South Brisbane Railway Easement and the former South Brisbane Library. Other historically significant places in the immediate vicinity are Cumbooquepa at Somerville House, Ship Inn, and South Brisbane Memorial Park.

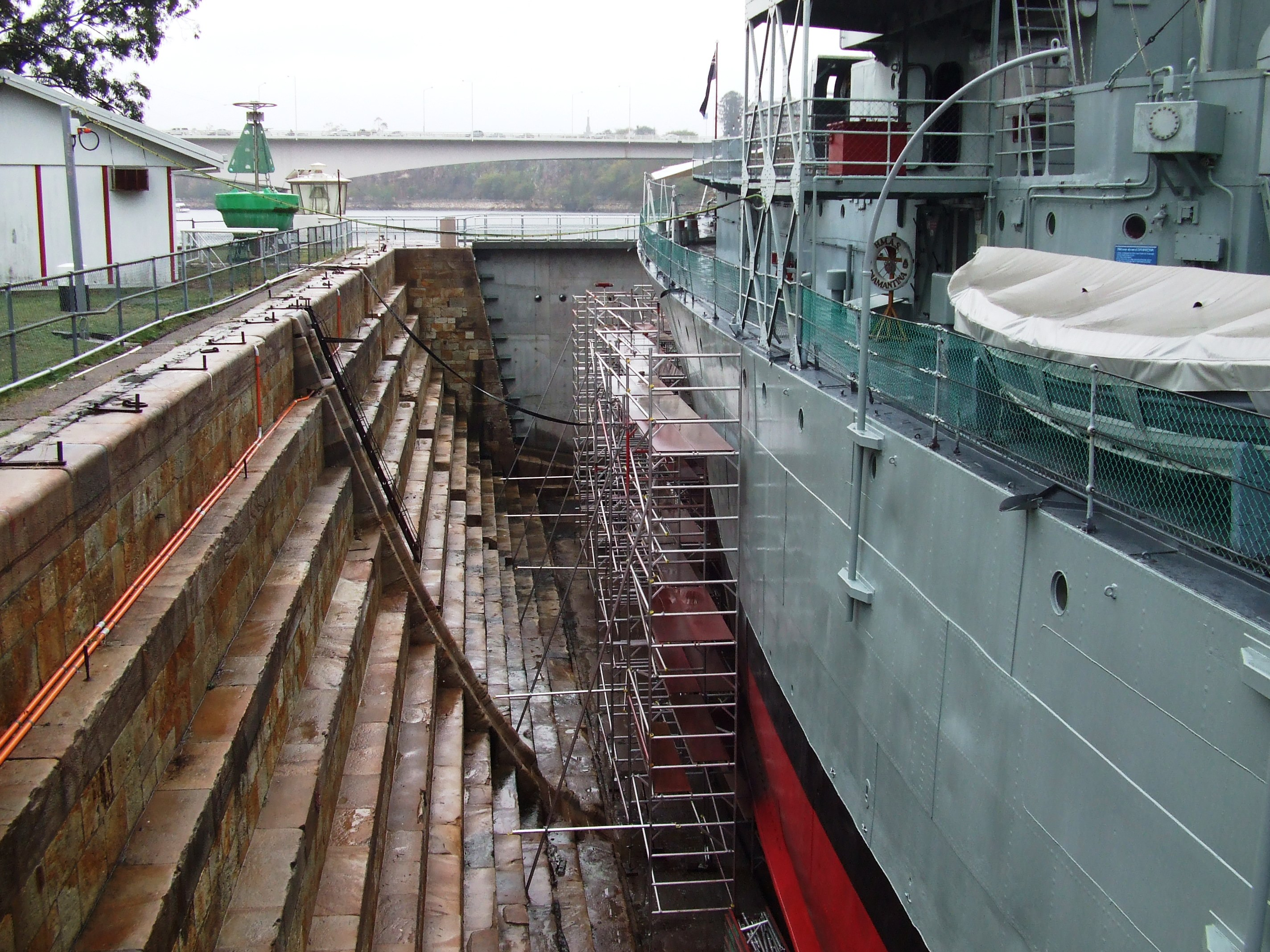
Altars (stepped sides) of South Brisbane Dry Dock, 2007 (HMAS Diamantina to the right)

The original section of the South Brisbane Dry Dock is U-shaped with stepped sides while the 1887 extension has sloping sides.

The dock was originally 320 feet (98 m) long, but was extended to 420 feet (130 m). The width at the top is 24.08 and 16.15 metres (79.0 and 53.0 ft) at the bottom. The overall depth is 9.75 metres (32.0 ft) with 5.79 metres (19.0 ft) at the entrance sill.

The rocky bottom is lined with 3 feet (0.91 m) of Portland cement overlaid by bricks and covered by Melbourne granite which is crossed by hardwood keel blocks. One Enoggera granite block was used in the coping to the west of the caisson (dock gate), next to a cast-iron plate bearing the contractor's name.

The excavated sides were almost perpendicular. To form the inverted arch or U-shape and prevent water permeating, the sides were constructed of puddled clay lined with concrete mixed with rubble then altars (steps in the dry dock wall) of Lockyer Creek freestone. The 1887 excavation to extend the dock required only limited lining and the base was not concreted until 1901.

The caisson was manufactured by the notable firm of RR Smellie & Co. of Brisbane. It is probably the largest locally made wrought iron composition in Queensland.

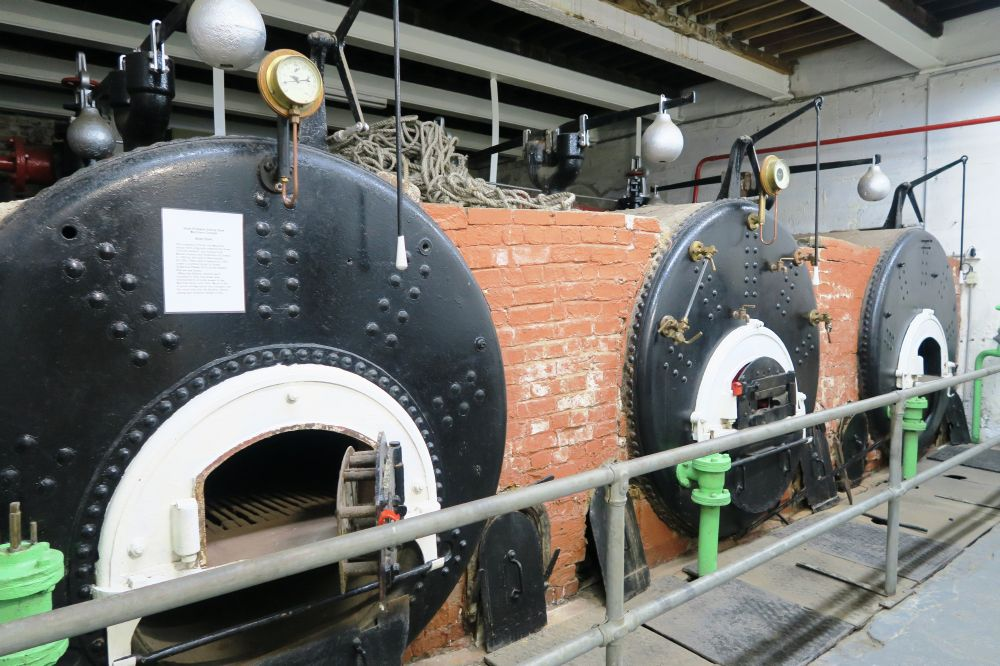
Three Cornish boilers, 2016

To the east of the dock is the brick pump house which has an arched roof, supported by timber beams, and a large brick chimney. The two centrifugal pumps for emptying the dock and steam boilers were imported from London. Three new Cornish boilers replaced the originals in 1907 and in 1924 the steam engines were replaced by electric motors constructed by Evans Deakin. During the busy war years the boiler house was enclosed by a concrete blockhouse. The Cornish boilers and their coal chutes, the pump, the electric engine with its sub-station and rope drives are extant but inoperative.

Attached to the blockhouse were the coal store and blacksmith shed, which was a low set timber building with arched corrugated iron roof. The Q Maritime Museum Association has built a copy of the original structure.

On the western side of the dry dock are additional timber and corrugated iron buildings, one of which was the two-storeyed dock master's office. Over the years timber and tin workshops and wharf facilities were built and demolished as the need arose.

The 15 ton (13.5 tonne) crane built by Ransomes & Rapier of Ipswich remains at the head of the dock. The rail siding, necessary for the delivery of coal, and other facilities and equipment have been removed. The site is shaded by eucalypts.

The dry dock site is incorporated in the Queensland Maritime Museum which includes many moveable heritage items, such as HMAS Diamantina which resides in the dock.

== Heritage listing ==
South Brisbane Dry Dock was listed on the Queensland Heritage Register on 21 October 1992 having satisfied the following criteria.

The place is important in demonstrating the evolution or pattern of Queensland's history.

The South Brisbane Dry Dock is significant historically as rare surviving evidence of 19th century shipping activity along the South Brisbane Reach, and indicative of the massive scale of former riverside industry in Brisbane.

The place demonstrates rare, uncommon or endangered aspects of Queensland's cultural heritage.

It is a rare Australian example of an intact dry dock dating from the 19th century, illustrating contemporary engineering and technology.

The place is important in demonstrating the principal characteristics of a particular class of cultural places.

It an important example of the work of engineer William D Nesbit in Queensland.

The place is important because of its aesthetic significance.

The place makes a strong landmark and aesthetic contribution to the South Brisbane townscape, and is an integral element in the historic precinct centred around South Brisbane Memorial Park, which also includes the former South Brisbane Railway Easement, the former South Brisbane Library , Cumbooquepa (Somerville House), the former South Brisbane Municipal Chambers and Ship Inn.

The place has a special association with the life or work of a particular person, group or organisation of importance in Queensland's history.

It is significant for its association with the work of contractors J & A Overend and manufacturers RR Smellie & Co., both of which firms made significant contributions to the development of Queensland in the 19th century.

== Engineering heritage award ==
The dock received an Engineering Heritage Marker from Engineers Australia as part of its Engineering Heritage Recognition Program.
