= HMAS Melville (naval base) =

Former naval base in Northern Territory, Australia

- Darwin, Northern Territory in Australia

Site information
- Type: Naval base
- Operator: Royal Australian Navy

Location
- Location in the Northern Territory
- Coordinates: 12°28′00″S 130°50′24″E

Site history
- Built: January 1935
- In use: January 1935 – 25 December 1974
- Fate: Destroyed by Cyclone Tracy
- Battles/wars: Pacific War, World War II; Battle of Darwin

HMAS Melville is a former Royal Australian Navy (RAN) shore base located in Darwin, Northern Territory, in Australia. The base was in use between 1935 and 1974.

== History ==
Established in January 1935 as HMAS Penguin V, a naval reserve depot, commanded by Lieutenant Commander H.P. Jarrett of the Naval Reserve District of Queensland. In 1937 Lieutenant Commander J.H. Walker was appointed the District Naval Officer of the newly created Naval District of the Northern Territory. A high-powered Wireless Transmitting Station was built in 1939 and also the construction of fuelling facilities, boom depot and improvements to Darwin's water supply. The depot was renamed HMAS Penguin IV with the outbreak of World War II. On 1 August 1940, the depot was commissioned as HMAS Melville.

The Naval Wireless Transmitting Station Coonawarra, which operated under the command of Melville, provided essential communications in support of the Allied operations in the Dutch East Indies and South West Pacific Area regions. The base was subjected to numerous bombing raids during the Battle of Darwin and suffered significant damage.

After the cessation of hostilities, the base was hampered by the continuing expansion of Darwin and the increase in numbers of naval personnel. It was decided to move the operations to the Naval Wireless Transmitting Station Coonawarra, which was commissioned on 16 March 1970 as HMAS Coonawarra. Melville continued to remain in use until it was destroyed by Cyclone Tracy on 25 December 1974.

== See also ==
- List of former Royal Australian Navy bases
