= South Brisbane Library =

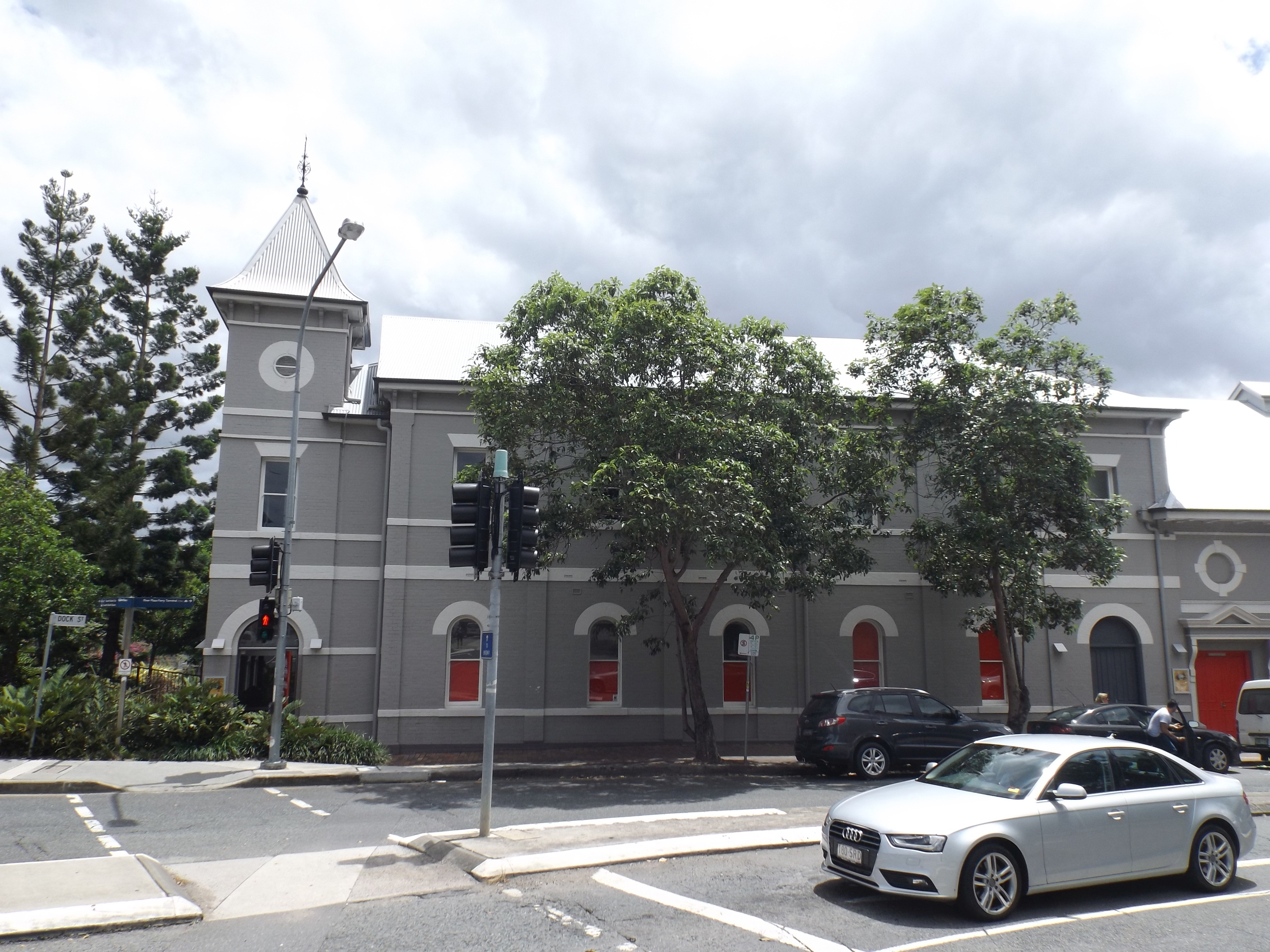
- Building in 2015

- Location within Queensland Location within Australia
- 27.4826°S 153.0264°E
- Location: 472 Stanley Street, South Brisbane, City of Brisbane, Queensland, Australia

History
- Design period: 1870s–1890s (late 19th century)
- Built: 1881–1902

Site notes
- Architect: Francis Drummond Greville Stanley
- Architectural style: Classicism

Queensland Heritage Register
- Official name: South Brisbane Library (former), College / South Brisbane Municipal Library and School of Arts, Mechanics Institute and Library / South Brisbane Technical, South Brisbane Post and Telegraph / Office South Brisbane
- Type: state heritage (built)
- Designated: 21 October 1992
- Reference no.: 600302
- Significant period: 1880s–1900s (historical); 1880s–1910s (fabric); 1880s–1970s (social)
- Significant components: post office, library – building, hall – concert
- Builders: W Macfarlane

South Brisbane Library is a heritage-listed former library at 472 Stanley Street, South Brisbane, City of Brisbane, Queensland, Australia. It was designed by Francis Drummond Greville Stanley and built from 1881 to 1902 by W Macfarlane. It is also known as South Brisbane School of Arts, South Brisbane Mechanics Institute, South Brisbane Technical College, and South Brisbane Post & Telegraph Office. It was added to the Queensland Heritage Register on 21 October 1992. It now houses the Griffith University Film School, which forms part of the Queensland College of Art.

== History ==
This complex is composed of three structures built at different times in response to different needs: the South Brisbane Post Office (1881); the South Brisbane Municipal Library (1897); and the City Concert Hall (1902).

The South Brisbane Post Office was designed by FDG Stanley and W Macfarlane was the contractor. The one-room post office occupied the ground floor. The postmaster's accommodation included three bedrooms and verandah upstairs and basement dining room, kitchen and bedroom. The original symmetrical front facade included a ground floor arcade with an open verandah above. The central focus was the arched masonry frontispiece.

The Post and Telegraph Office was closed in late 1889 to become the South Brisbane Mechanics Institute and Library. In 1893, the South Brisbane Town Council took over the site.

About 1897, the council with the help of a government subsidy built the corner structure and the complex became known as the South Brisbane Municipal Library and Technical College. John Henry Burley is said to be the architect.

The third stage is the concert hall designed by Alexander Brown Wilson in 1902. This building included Technical College classrooms in the basement.

In 1909, the council was offered Richard John Randall's collection of artwork. About the same time, with the Queensland Government's take-over of the Technical College, many classrooms became vacant. The council decided to convert the library on the first floor into an art gallery.

Architect George David Payne was employed to convert the former library to the Randall Art Gallery and extend the concert hall and supper room. About 1911, the hall was enlarged at the river end and the supper room extended so that they were capable of seating 600 and 400 persons respectively. The Gallery was officially opened in July 1914.

Between 1910 and 1920, the post office section was rendered and the front enclosed.

The Greater Brisbane City Council took over the structure in 1925 and the library continued to function until 1973. However, the Randall collection was transferred to the Brisbane City Hall. For many years the concert hall continued to be well patronised particularly during the Second World War (1939–45).

Between 1973 and about 1987, the building was neglected and vandalised. The derelict library was refurbished for World Expo '88 as a convention centre and exclusive club. The exterior was painted and the interior was substantially altered to provide two large conference rooms and club rooms. The former Post Office section was converted to modern offices and concrete stairs installed.

It now houses the Griffith University Film School, which forms part of the Queensland College of Art.

== Description ==
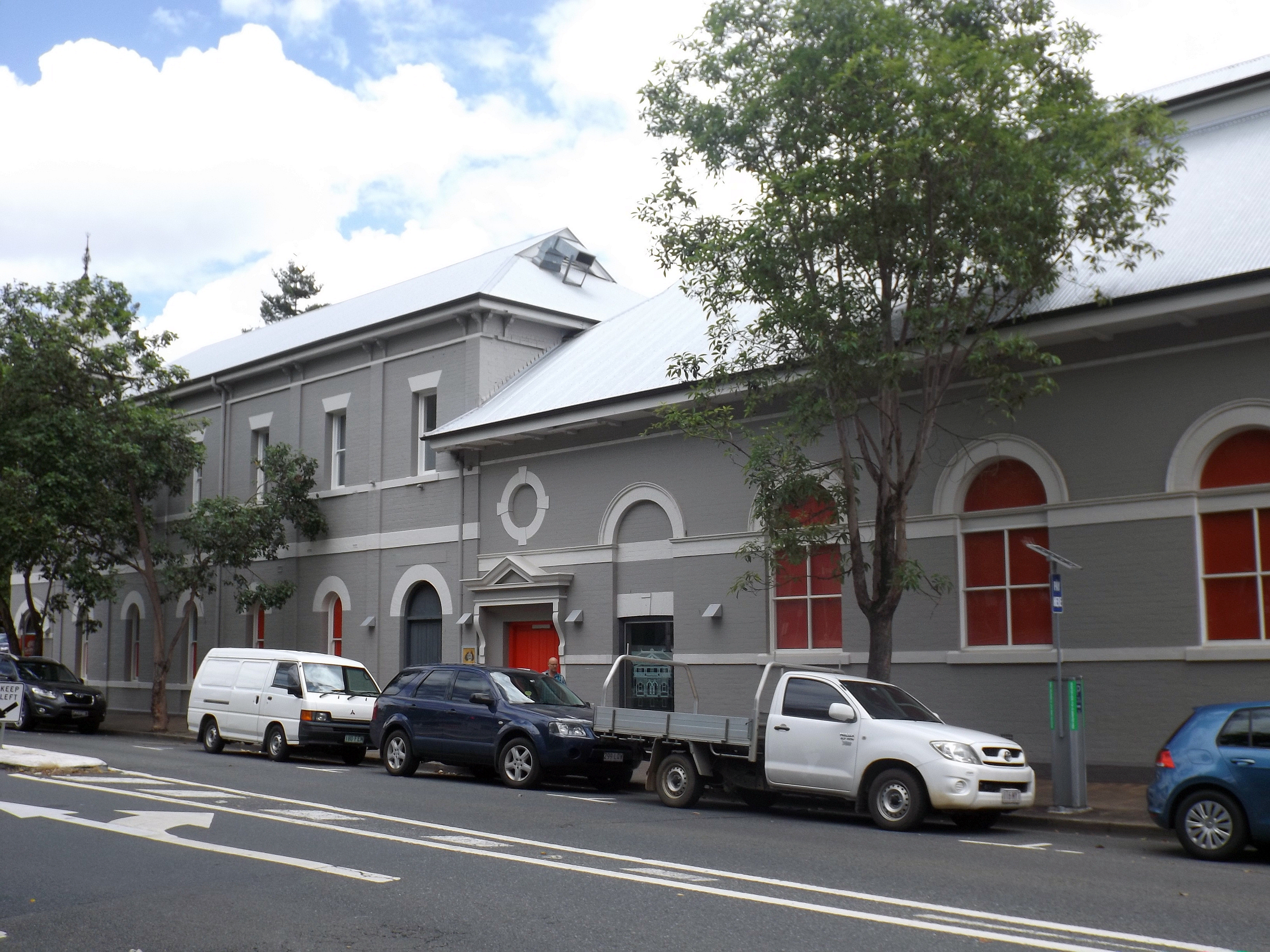
View from Dock Street, 2015

The former South Brisbane Library is located within an historic precinct centred on South Brisbane Memorial Park. It is opposite the former South Brisbane Municipal Chambers (South Brisbane Town Hall) and adjacent to the former South Brisbane Railway Easement and South Brisbane Dry Dock (Queensland Maritime Museum). Other historically significant places in the immediate vicinity include Cumbooquepa (Somerville House) and Ship Inn.

The former South Brisbane Library consists of three interlinking buildings. The two-storeyed former Post Office and Library both have Stanley Street frontages, similar gable roofs and string courses that delineate the two floors. The former City Concert Hall is a single-storeyed auditorium with a Dock Street frontage. Both the hall and corner building are polychromatic brick structures with matching arched windows.

The first stage (1881) is a two-storeyed masonry building with basement. The hipped roof has a gablet and there was a frieze above the verandah roof. The front facade has multi-paned windows, a pair of faceted bays and raked verandah roof supported by large timber brackets. f

The 1890s section, on the corner, is an asymmetrical brick building. It has a gable roof, a gablet of similar proportions to the post office, and a tower on the southern corner. The World Expo '88 interior refurbishment included the carpeting and painting of the interior, a new staircase from the front foyer to the first floor and modern fretwork brackets.

The third stage (1902), at the rear, is a long rectangular building with light coloured horizontal strings and window arches. The corrugated iron hipped roof has a continuous raised roof ventilator. The interior walls has timber panelled dados, plaster raked ceilings and an unadorned proscenium stage. French doors open onto a verandah.

A gallery and new verandah were added as part of the Expo renovations.

== Heritage listing ==
The former South Brisbane Library was listed on the Queensland Heritage Register on 21 October 1992 having satisfied the following criteria.

The place is important in demonstrating the evolution or pattern of Queensland's history.

The former South Brisbane Library is significant historically for its importance as the former Post and Telegraph Office, mechanic's institute, technical college, library, art gallery, and concert hall of South Brisbane, and remains a tangible reminder of civic identity. It is also significant as a marker of the former alignment of Stanley Street, the main commercial thoroughfare of South Brisbane in the late 19th and early 20th centuries.

The place is important in demonstrating the principal characteristics of a particular class of cultural places.

Despite internal refurbishment, the former concert hall remains important in illustrating the principal characteristics of an early 20th century auditorium designed to address the warm Queensland climate.

The place is important because of its aesthetic significance.

The building demonstrates a visual cohesiveness, despite having been constructed in several stages to the designs of at least three architects, and makes a significant landmark and aesthetic contribution to the historic precinct centred on South Brisbane Memorial Park. It is a significant component of the riverside townscape as seen from the city.

The place has a special association with the life or work of a particular person, group or organisation of importance in Queensland's history.

The building is an important example of the public work of Brisbane architect AB Wilson.
