= Queensland Maritime Museum =

Museum in Brisbane, Australia

Coordinates: 27°28′55″S 153°1′34″E

- Established: 1971
- Location: Brisbane, Australia
- Type: Queensland history, Maritime history, Maritime archaeology
- Visitors: 35,000 visitors per annum
- CEO: Emma Di Muzio
- Curator: Don Braben
- Website: Queensland Maritime Museum

The Queensland Maritime Museum is located on the southern bank of the Brisbane River just south of the South Bank Parklands and Queensland Cultural Centre precinct of Brisbane, and close to the Goodwill Bridge.

The museum was founded in 1971 and contains a two-level exhibition building presenting historic sailing ship models together with merchant shipping from early cargo ships to modern container ships, tankers and cruise liners. It is housed in the building used for the “Pavilion of Promise” at World Expo 88, and the South Brisbane Dry Dock which was built in the 1870s and was 313 feet (95 m) long and 60 feet (18 m) wide. In 1887 the dock was extended to 430 feet (131 m) due to the increasing size of vessels.

The museum also includes a library that stocks documents, pictures and other relevant artifacts relating to maritime history. There are several maps that show how early navigators created accurate charts.

Information is also provided about some of the 1,500 plus shipwrecks that have occurred along the Queensland coast including the Great Barrier Reef.

== Vessels ==
The 121 feet (37 m) steam tug Forceful, the only remaining working coal-fired steam tug in Queensland, is berthed at the museum wharf and there are regular sailings down the Brisbane River. It was built in 1925 by Alex Stephen & Son Ltd., Glasgow, Scotland. In 1941 it was chartered by the government for service in the Middle East, but did not sail because Japan entered World War II. She was then requisitioned by the Royal Australian Navy and became known as HMAS Forceful. She was armed with a 20mm Oerlikon Machine Gun and a .303" Vickers machine gun. At present, she is laid up for repairs, estimated to reach around $250,000AUD.

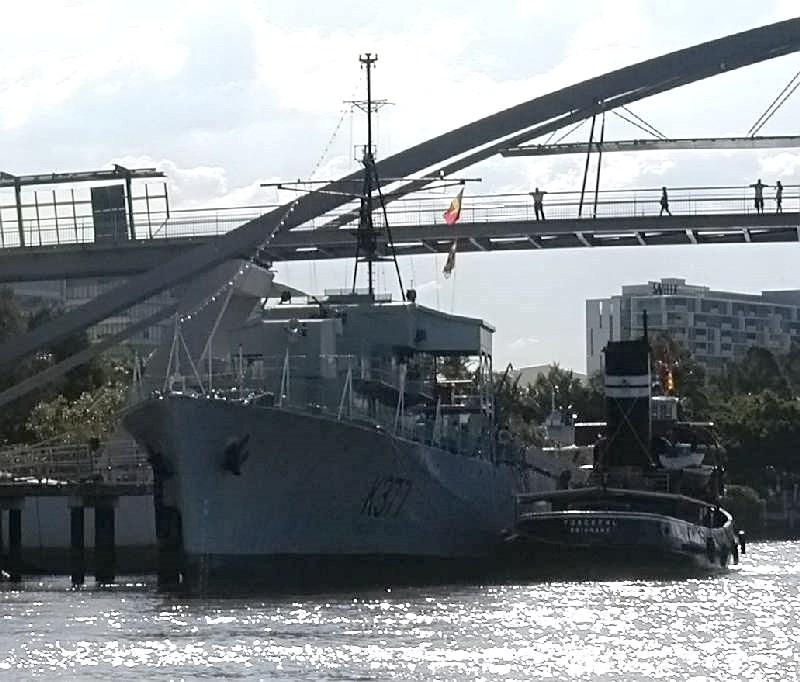
HMAS Diamantina

HMAS Diamantina, a River Class frigate is in the South Brisbane Dry Dock (Graving Dock), and on board, visitors can view the museum's collection of Australian Naval memorabilia.

Another WW2 vessel located at the museum is the Torres Strait type of pearling lugger, "Penguin", which was used by the Americans during WW2, along with the dinghy from General Douglas MacArthur's motor Yacht "Shangri-La".

Also visible is the Light Ship CLS4 Carpentaria.

== Lighthouses exhibition ==
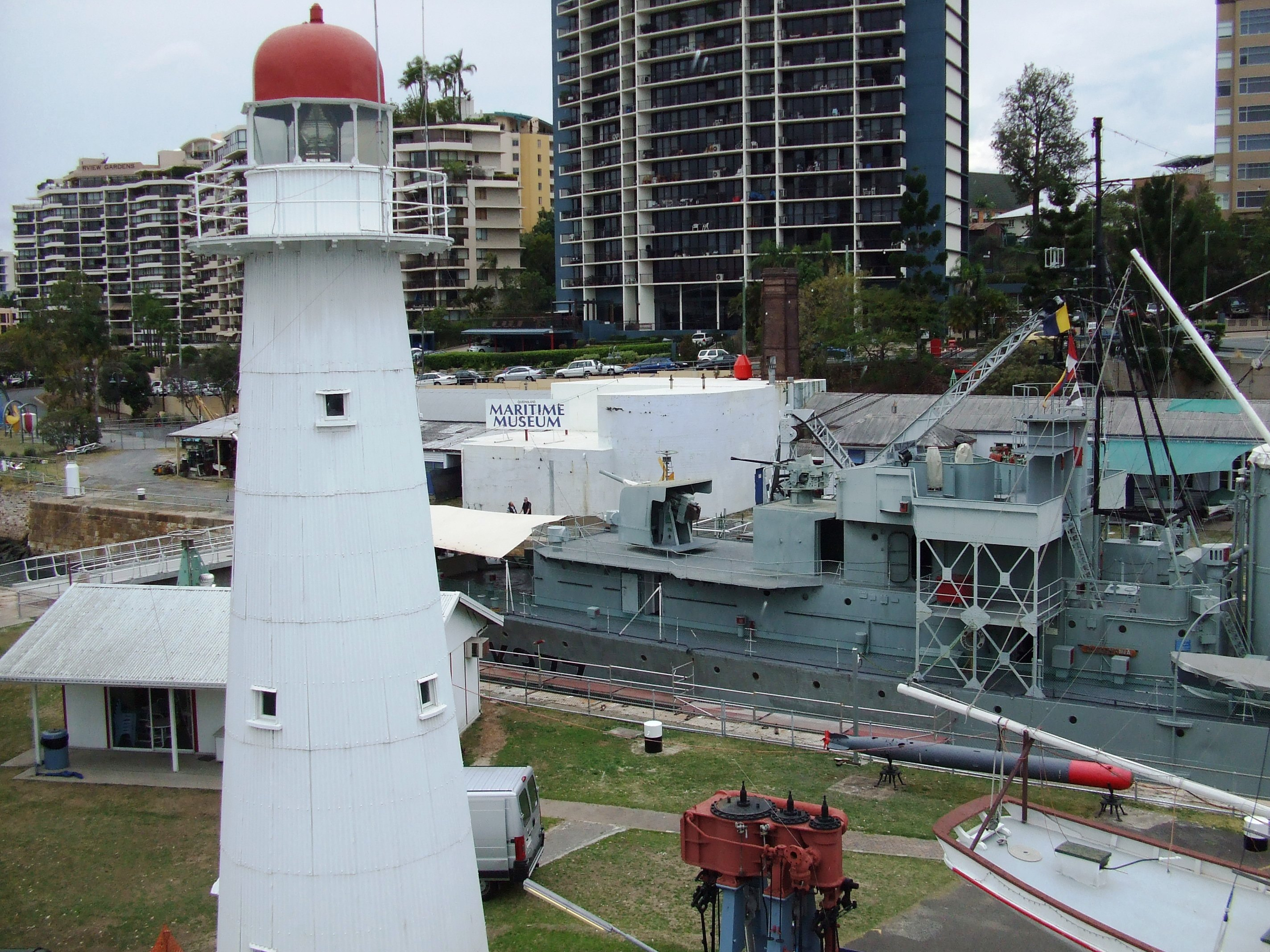
Bulwer Island Light is on display at the Queensland Maritime Museum.

Information is also provided about how lighthouse technology developed from the early oil wick burners to the modern equipment used in the present day. The former Bulwer Island Light, which operated at Bulwer Island at the mouth of the Brisbane River from 1912 to 1983, is on display outside the museum. It is a white, octagonal wooden tower covered with corrugated iron sheets, and the roof of lantern is red.

Also displayed are the original lens of Archer Point Light, the pedestal and gearbox of Bustard Head Light, and the lens and apparatus from Cape Don Light in the Northern Territory.

== Gallery ==
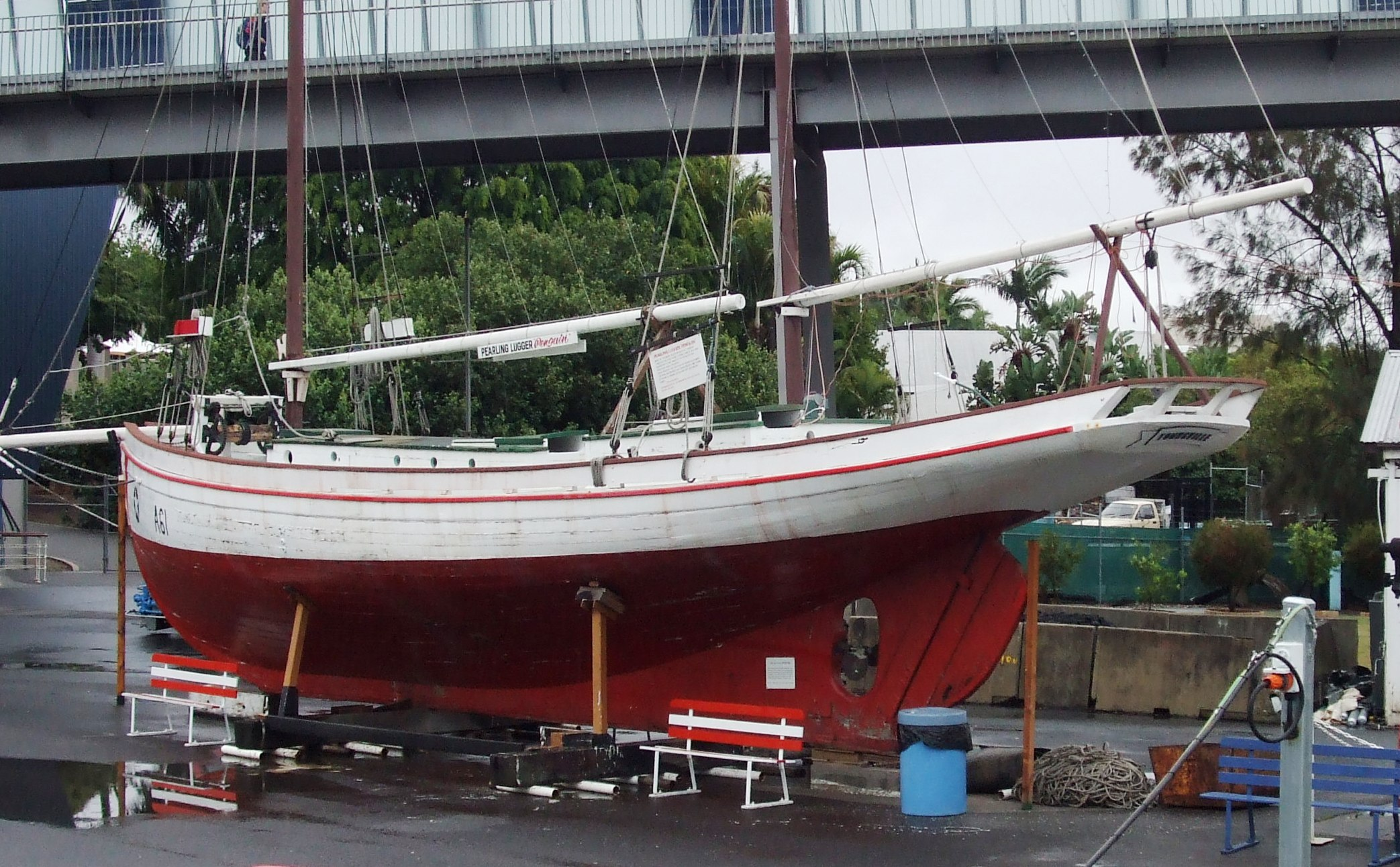
Pearling Lugger "Penguin"

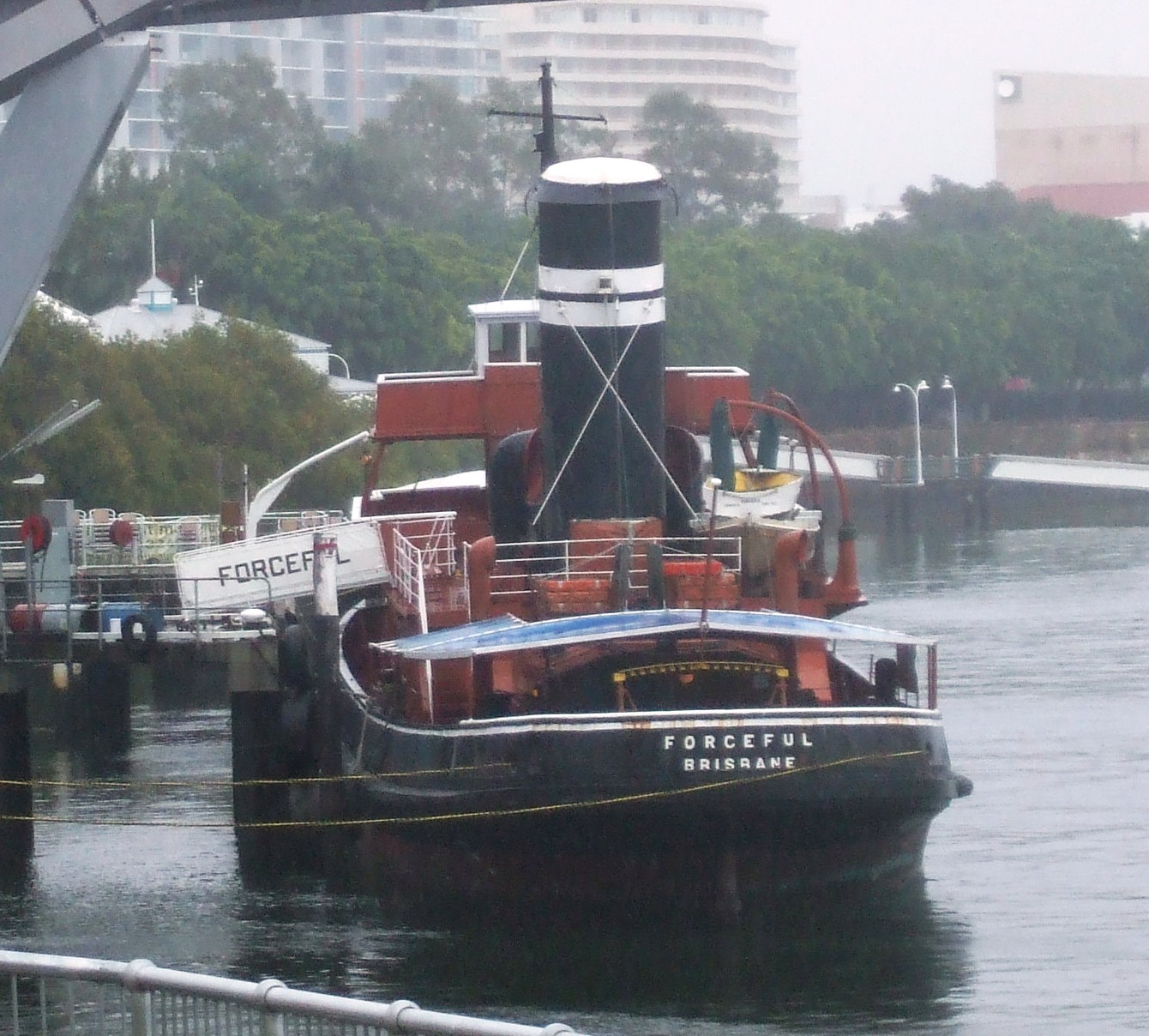
Steam tug "Forceful"
