= Abraham Geiger =

German rabbi and scholar (1810–1874)

Rabbi Abraham Geiger
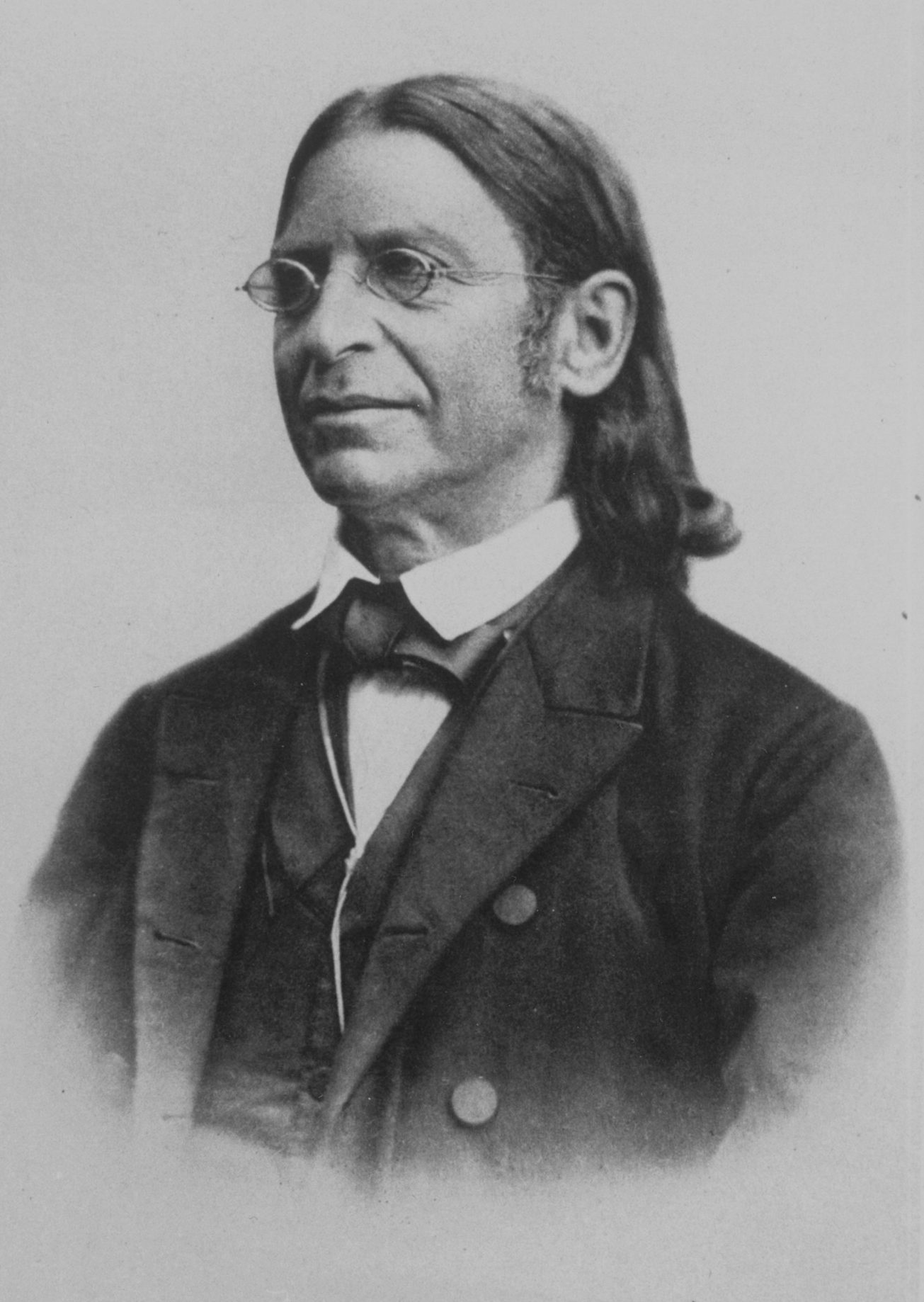

Personal life
- Born: אַבְרָהָם גַיְיגֶר; 24 May 1810 Frankfurt, Grand Duchy of Frankfurt
- Died: 23 October 1874 (aged 64) Berlin, Prussia, Germany
- Spouse: Emilie Oppenheim
- Children: Robert Geiger; Berthold Geiger; Ludwig Geiger; Jenny Geiger; Ida Geiger
- Parents: Aaron Yechiel Michel (Michael Lazarus) Geiger (father); Röschen Wallau (mother)
- Education: Heidelberg University; University of Bonn
- Occupation: Head of the Highschool for Jewish Studies in Berlin (1872–1874); Editor of Jüdische Zeitschrift für Wissenschaft und Leben (1862–1874)
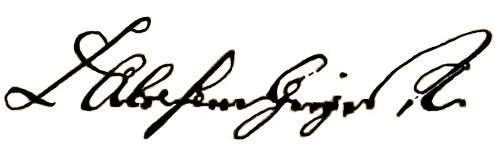
- Signature

Religious life
- Religion: Judaism

Jewish leader
- Position: Rabbi in Breslau (now Wrocław)
- Began: 1840
- Ended: 1863
- Other: Rabbi of Frankfurt am Main (1863–1870); Rabbi of Central Berlin (1870–1874)

Abraham Geiger (Hebrew: אַבְרָהָם גַיְיגֶר ʼAvrāhām Gayger; 24 May 1810 – 23 October 1874) was a German rabbi and scholar who is considered the founding father of Reform Judaism and the academic field of Quranic studies. Emphasizing Judaism's constant development through its history and universalist traits, Geiger sought to re-formulate received forms and design what he regarded as a religion compliant with modern times.

== Biography ==
As a child, Geiger started doubting the traditional understanding of Judaism when his studies in classical history seemed to contradict the biblical claims of divine authority. At the age of seventeen, he began writing his first work, a comparison between the legal style of the Mishnah and Biblical and Talmudic law. He also worked on a dictionary of Mishnaic (Rabbinic) Hebrew.

Geiger's friends provided him with financial assistance which enabled him to attend the University in Heidelberg, to the great disappointment of his family. His main focus was centered on the areas of philology, Syriac, Hebrew, and classics, but he also attended lectures in philosophy and archaeology. After one semester, he transferred to the University of Bonn, where he studied at the same time as Samson Raphael Hirsch. Hirsch initially formed a friendship with Geiger, and with him organized a society of Jewish students for the stated purpose of practicing homiletics, but with the deeper intention of bringing them closer to Jewish values. It was to this society that Geiger preached his first sermon (January 2, 1830). In later years, he and Hirsch became bitter opponents as the leaders of two opposing Jewish movements.

At Bonn, Geiger began an intense study of Arabic and the Koran, winning a prize for his essay, written originally in Latin, and later published in German under the title Was hat Mohammed aus dem Judenthume aufgenommen? ("What did Mohammed take from Judaism?"). The essay earned Geiger a doctorate at the University of Marburg. It demonstrated that large parts of the Koran were taken from, or based on, rabbinic literature. This book was Geiger's first step in a much larger intellectual project. Geiger sought to demonstrate Judaism's central influence on Christianity and Islam. He believed that neither movement possessed religious originality, but were simply a vehicle to transmit the Jewish monotheistic belief to the pagan world.

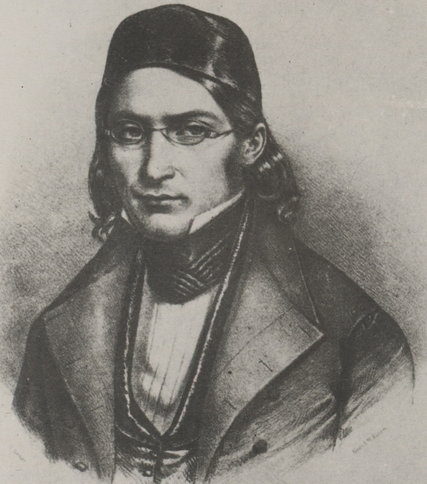
Geiger, c. 1840

At this time, no university professorships were available in Germany to Jews; so, Geiger was forced to seek a position as rabbi. He found a position in the Jewish community of Wiesbaden (1832–1837). There, he continued his academic publications primarily through the scholarly journals he founded and edited, including Wissenschaftliche Zeitschrift für jüdische Theologie (1835–1839) and Jüdische Zeitschrift für Wissenschaft und Leben (1862–1875). His journals became important vehicles in their day for publishing Jewish scholarship, chiefly historical and theological studies, as well as a discussion of contemporary events.

By that time, Geiger had begun his program of religious reforms, chiefly in the synagogue liturgy. For example, he abolished the prayers of mourning for the Temple, believing that since Jews were German citizens, such prayers would appear to be disloyal to the ruling power and could possibly spark antisemitism. Geiger was the driving force in convening several synods of reform-minded rabbis with the intention of formulating a program of progressive Judaism. However, unlike Samuel Holdheim, he did not want to create a separate community. Rather, his goal was to change Judaism from within. Geiger was the author of a siddur, the "Seder Tefillah Debar Yom be-Yomo" ("Israelitisches Gebetbuch für den Oeffentlichen Gottesdienst in Ganzen Jahre"), published in both Hebrew and German in Breslau in 1854. Geiger's siddur was considered less radical than the Hamburg Temple's "Seder ha-'Abodah", written by Seckel Isaac Fränkel and Meyer Israel Bresselau.

== Reformer ==
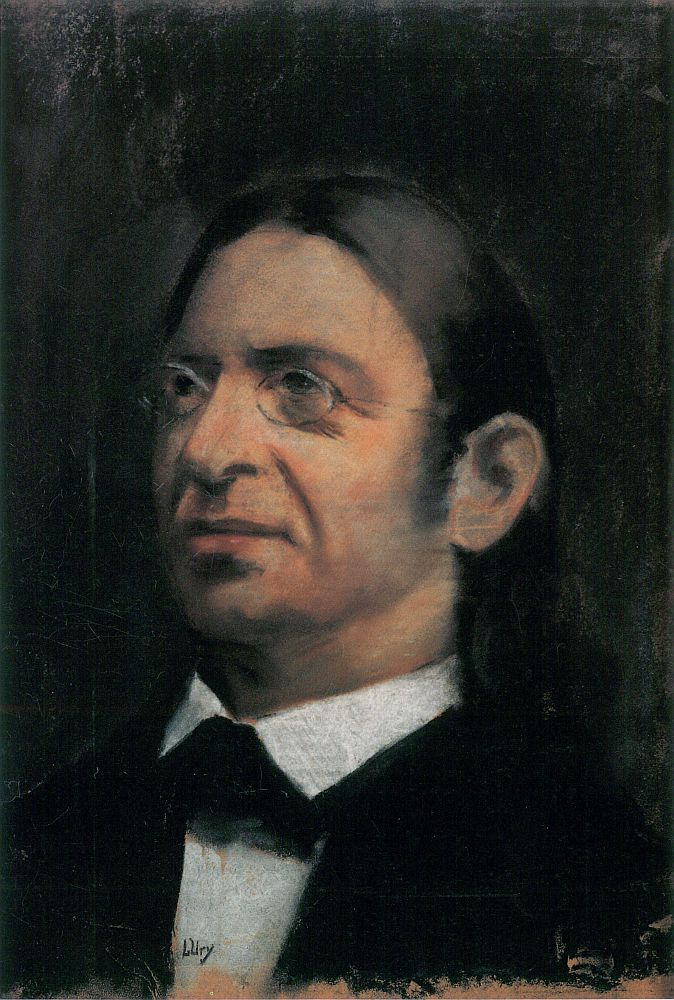
Abraham Geiger by Lesser Ury, c. 1905

In the Germany of the 19th century, Geiger and Samuel Holdheim, along with Israel Jacobson and Leopold Zunz, stood out as the founding fathers of Reform Judaism. Geiger was a more moderate and scholarly reformer, seeking to found this new branch of Judaism on the scientific study of history, without assuming that any Jewish text was divinely written.

Geiger was not only a scholar and researcher commenting on important subjects and characters in Jewish history – he was also a rabbi responsible for much of the reform doctrine of the mid-19th century. He contributed much of the character to the reform movement that remains today. Reform historian Michael A. Meyer has stated that, if any one person can be called the founder of Reform Judaism, it must be Geiger.

Much of Geiger's writing has been translated into English from the original German. There have been many biographical and research texts about him, such as the work Abraham Geiger and the Jewish Jesus by Susannah Heschel (1998), which examines Geiger's radical contention that the "New Testament" depicts Jesus as a Pharisee teaching Judaism.

Some of Geiger's studies are included in The Origins of The Koran: Classic Essays on Islam's Holy Book edited by Ibn Warraq. Other works are Judaism and Islam (1833), and An Appeal to My Community (1842).

== Criticism ==
Samson Raphael Hirsch devoted a good many issues of his journal Jeschurun to criticizing Geiger's reform stance (published in English as Hirsch, Collected Writings).

Some critics also attacked Geiger's opposition to a Jewish national identity; most notably, he was criticized when he refused to intervene during the Damascus affair, a blood libel, in 1840. However, Jewish historian Steven Bayme has concluded that Geiger had actually vigorously protested on humanitarian grounds.

== Geiger and Orthodox, Conservative, and Reform Judaism ==
=== Geiger's rejection of Orthodox Judaism ===
To Geiger, Judaism was unique because of its monotheism and ethics. He began to identify less with the "rigidity of Talmudic legalism, developed over centuries of ghettoization inflicted by Christian Intolerance ... in medieval Christendom", that defined and confined the existence of Orthodox Judaism in the 19th century in Germany. He believed that, "the Torah, as well as the Talmud, should be studied critically and from the point of view of the historian, that of evolution [and] development". As Geiger grew into his adolescence and young adulthood, he began to establish a more liberal approach to, and understanding of, Judaism than his traditional Orthodox Jewish background dictated. He thus rejected Orthodox Jewish tradition in favor of a liberal outlook.

=== Conservative Judaism's rejection of Geiger ===
In 1837, Geiger arranged a meeting of reform-minded rabbis in Wiesbaden for the purpose of discussing measures of concern to Judaism, and continued to be a leader of liberal German rabbinical thought through 1846. When he was nominated as a finalist for the position of Chief Rabbi in Breslau in 1838, it ignited a heated controversy between conservative and liberal factions within the Jewish community. Orthodox factions accused Geiger of being a Karaite or Sadducee, and therefore prevented him from being appointed Chief Rabbi. In 1840, however, the Orthodox Rabbi of Breslau died, leading to the secession of the Orthodox faction and the appointment of Geiger as Chief Rabbi.

Throughout his time in Breslau as Chief Rabbi and after, the Positive-Historical School of Rabbi Zecharias Frankel continued to reject Geiger's philosophies. In 1841, he and Frankel clashed at the second Hamburg Temple dispute. When the Jewish Theological Seminary was founded there in 1854, thanks in part to Geiger's efforts, he was not appointed to its faculty, though he had long been at the forefront of attempts to establish a faculty of Jewish theology. More conservatives regarded Geiger's theological stance as too liberal. Therefore, in 1863, Geiger left Breslau to become a Rabbi of liberal communities in Frankfurt and, later, Berlin. "Ultimately, in 1871, he was appointed to the faculty of the newly founded Reform rabbinical college in Berlin, Hochschule für die Wissenschaft des Judentums, where he spent his final years."

=== A new approach to Reform Judaism ===
Initially, Reform Judaism grew out of some Jews being uninterested in the "strict observances required of Orthodoxy", and an attempt to alter the appearance and ritual of Judaism to mimic German Protestantism. Geiger, however, turned to a more "coherent ideological framework to justify innovations in the liturgy and religious practice". Geiger argued that, "Reform Judaism was not a rejection of earlier Judaism, but a recovery of the Pharisaic halakhic tradition, which is nothing other than the principle of continual further development in accord with the times, the principle of not being slaves to the letter of the Bible, but rather to witness over and over its spirit and its authentic faith-consciousness."

== See also ==
- History of the Quran
- Lazarus Geiger

== Footnotes ==
Attribution

- Singer, Isidore; Hirsch, Emil G. (1906). "GEIGER, ABRAHAM". Jewish Encyclopedia.
- Abrahams, Israel (1911). "Geiger, Abraham" . In Chisholm, Hugh (ed.). Encyclopædia Britannica. Vol. 11 (11th ed.). Cambridge University Press. p. 551.
