= Hamburg Temple disputes =

19th century interdenomenational Jewish controversy

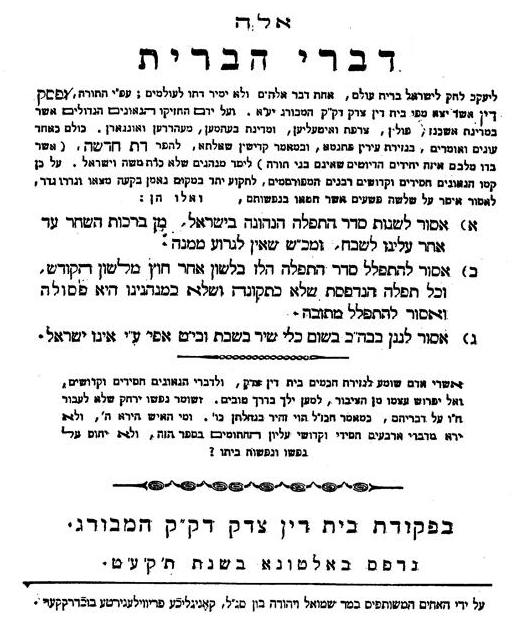
Words of the Covenant title page

The Hamburg Temple disputes (German: Hamburger Tempelstreite) were the two controversies which erupted around the Israelite Temple in Hamburg, the first permanent Reform synagogue, which elicited fierce protests from Orthodox rabbis. The events were a milestone in the coalescence of both modern perceptions of Judaism. The primary occurred between 1818 and 1821, and the latter from 1841 to 1842.

== First dispute ==
=== Background ===
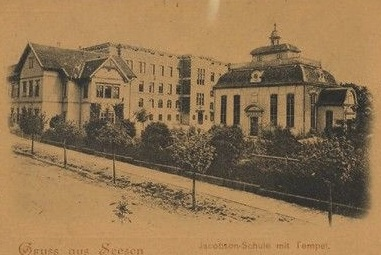
The Jacobson Temple (right), Seesen

In the latter half of the 18th century, Jews in the German principalities were experiencing a profound transformation. Communal corporate privileges and obligations, along with those of all other groups in society, were gradually abolished by the enlightened absolutist authorities, attempting to create centralized states. Economic and civil restrictions were lifted piecemeal. A process of acculturation commenced, at a time when rabbinical courts and communal elders imperceptibly lost their means to enforce Jewish law (Halakha), like the ḥerem (excommunication), and legitimacy to wield them. In Hamburg, the government checked the jurisdiction of the strictly conservative Rabbi Raphael Cohen after repeated complaints from transgressors he punished – people who ate non-kosher food, a member of the priestly caste who married a woman forbidden to him via deception and the like – contributing to his decision to resign in 1799. The more cultured Jews were also inspired by Enlightenment ideals, forming the small and short-lived Haskalah movement, though the influence of those was meager in comparison to the more prosaic, aforementioned factors. Growing swaths of German Jewry were becoming nonobservant and apathetic towards their religion.

Concurrently, along the principle voiced by the Stanislas Marie Adélaïde, comte de Clermont-Tonnerre, "We must refuse everything to the Jews as a nation and accord everything to Jews as individuals... they should not be allowed to form in the state either a political body or an order", French Jews were emancipated in 1791. In 1806, the Grand Sanhedrin in Paris declared them no longer tolerated aliens, considered a foreign nation for centuries, but "Frenchmen of Mosaic Faith." All quarters in German Jewry, even the most Orthodox, gradually embraced local culture and national identification, both due to hope for the same equality and government coercion. Some circles concluded that this process must be total, and that Judaism had to be purged from any element that was or could be interpreted as political, and become strictly confessional. This sentiment, combined with aversion to beliefs and practices that could no longer be rationalized or fit modern sensitivities, and conviction that the young generation would commit apostasy – as many among the more acculturated were doing – unless religion would be thoroughly refashioned. An impetus for reform permeated the progressive strata. Several radical maskilim, like Lazarus Bendavid and David Friedländer, suggested reducing Judaism to little more than Deism, though they had barely any influence.

In 1806, the Kassel-based journal Sulamith published an anonymous article which offered, for the first known time, a revolutionary reformulation of Jewish messianic belief. The author suggested that Samuel of Nehardea's statement this world differs from the Messianic Era only in respect to the Servitude of Israel to the Nations meant that emancipation was tantamount to divine redemption. He detached it from the ancient precepts of a personal redeemer who will reign as king and lead the exiled back to Zion, as the Temple will be rebuilt and the sacrificial cult restored.

In 1808, the Royal Consistory of the Israelites in the Kingdom of Westphalia was established. Headed by Israel Jacobson and Rabbi Mendel Steinhardt, it was created by the government of Jérôme Bonaparte to facilitate a civic betterment of the Jews. Jacobson, though an avowed modernist, had little ideological consistency in the religious sphere (though the very idea that Judaism could be limited to a "religious sphere" was yet new and revolutionary to most). He was influenced by the aesthetic concepts of Christian worship, quite alien to Ashkenazi Jews at the time: decorum, devotion, formality and sobriety; but he did not cross the line into principled issues. Even the ritual reforms he implemented in synagogues were quite innocuous, and were mostly adopted by Neo-Orthodox rabbis later.

On 17 July 1810, Jacobson opened a prayer house in Seesen, to serve the modern Jewish school he founded earlier. He named it "temple", a rather common designation at the time, borrowed from the French and used also by traditional Jewish houses of prayer. Certain that the lack of decorum drove the young away from synagogue, he abridged the service, introduced both prayers and an edifying sermon in German (very different from the old talmudic discourse in Yiddish), and confirmation for children. Contrary to prevalent custom, no mechitza hid from view the women sitting separately at the upper story. A choir and an organ accompanied the prayer: instrumental music in synagogue was almost unknown among Ashkenazim, and the organ was strongly associated with church services. Another feature was the use of Sephardic Hebrew, deemed more aesthetic than the traditional Ashkenazi pronunciation. Admiration for the acculturated and integrated Sephardim of Western Europe, whose emancipation was rather a formality as they already enjoyed extensive privileges, was a central element in the worldview of their Central European brethren, both of the moderate and radical cast, hoping to emulate them. It inspired the Haskalah to a great measure. The old pronunciation was associated with the Jews of Poland, considered backward and superstitious. Jacobson's temple elicited barely any protest. Baruch Mevorah noted that all the reforms introduced lacked either consistency or an ideological undertone.

In 1812, Friedländer penned "Ein Wort zu seinr Zeit" ("A Timely Word"). Along with exhortation for thorough reforms in all spheres, he added that the classic Messianic belief was no longer tenable or rational, enjoining Jews to excise any mention of it from their liturgy. Another progressive leader, Abraham Muhr of Breslau, rebuked Friedländer in his pamphlet "Jerubaal", published a year afterwards. He accused him of unscrupulous opportunism and disregard for tradition. On the Messianic issue, Muhr wrote that it must be retained, especially as omission would evoke a harsh response from many. He offered instead to emphasize the universalist aspects of this belief, while obfuscating the particularist ones. Mevorach observed that Muhr elucidated what was to become a tenet of nascent Reform Judaism: preserving the Messianic ideal, yet transforming it into "a Jewish hope for a universal redemption of all mankind."

=== Berlin and the Radiance of Justice ===
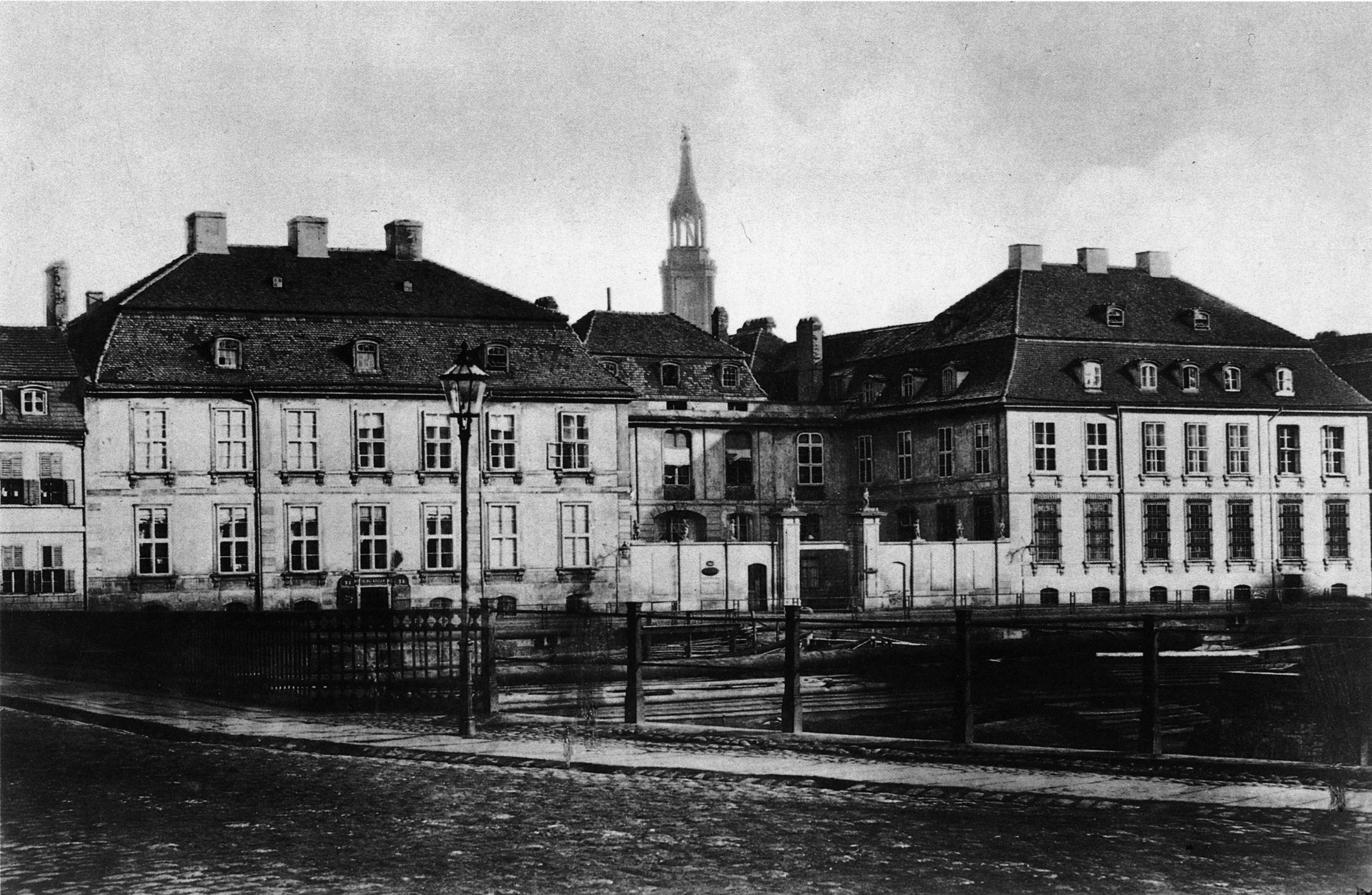
The Palais Itzig, where Jacobson held his first service in Berlin.

The Consistory closed in 1813. Jacobson moved to Berlin, where he soon became acquainted with local Jewish notables who shared his persuasion regarding the necessity of reform in services. He was supported by the wealthy Jacob Herz Beer, father of Giacomo Meyerbeer, and Ruben Samuel Gumpertz. On Shavuot (14 June) 1815, they opened a private prayer association in the residence of Daniel Itzig. It was attended by four hundred people. Copying most of Seesen's innovations, it had decorum, vestments for the cantor, confirmation, a choir and an organ playing on the feast day – operated by a gentile, which they assumed was a sufficient measure to avoid desecrating it by work – and the like. Mevorach emphasized that their abbreviated liturgy, though it dropped several segments, yet again bore no principled undertone. Michael Meyer commented that "like reforms in Westphalia, those in Berlin were limited to externals and dominated by aesthetic considerations." The private services were a great success. Leopold Zunz, who visited them on the Yom Kippur, commented that "people who did not attend a synagogue in twenty years spent the entire holiday inside; most of the young fasted." Due to lack of space, Beer began conducting similar prayers also in his Spandauer Straße 72 mansion.

The established congregation of Berlin viewed all this with apprehension. Rabbi Akiva Eger of Posen, perhaps the generation's greatest halakhic authority, published a short rebuke. He condemned the use of German in prayer, though not any other innovation, and castigated the Berlin group for wishing to emulate the "Ordinances of the Gentiles" ("neither shall ye walk in their ordinances"). The chief rabbi of Berlin, Meyer Simon Weyl, launched a formal protest to the government, utilizing a legal clause that allowed prayer only in the single recognized synagogue. On orders of King Frederick William III, both private temples were closed on 9 December 1815. Beer concluded that the only possible course of action was to vie for influence in the main prayerhouse. Seeking approbation for the reformed service, he sent enquiries to several rabbis in Italy, where he had business contacts. He did not explicitly describe the situation in Berlin, but vaguely asked about the permissibility of various practices. Italian communities, well acculturated and integrated, served as a matter of particular interest to German Jews, apart from their penchant for all things Sephardic. They had a long tradition of instrumental music in their synagogues, since the days of Salamone Rossi, making them an excellent precedent.

Beer's correspondents replied around December 1816. On several matters, all were unanimous: communities often had several synagogues, each with its own rite, thus lending him support against accusations of sectarianism (lo titgodedu, the ban on separating oneself from communal norms and institutions); sermons were delivered in the vernacular; the congregation repeated the prayer silently while only the cantor raised his voice, and musical instruments were quite often used. On the organ, the rabbis of Mantua answered they never used it but knew that other communities once did, and therefore it could not have been prohibited. Most other responses are lost, but according to later statements by their authors, those were more stringent. Rabbi Jacob Emanuel Cracovia of Venice and Emanuel Castelnuovo of Padua permitted the organ in synagogues, but not during prayer lest it interfere with the enunciation of formulae. They allowed it only on weekdays and if it be handled by a Jewish musician. Both grounded their opinions on precedent in cities in Italy and France, and even on Jacobson's Seesen temple. The most positive response was received from Jacob Hay Recanati, chief rabbi of Verona, who completely endorsed the organ and even directly referred to its use on the Sabbath, allowing it as long as it was done by a gentile. Another such was composed by Shem-Tov Samum of Leghorn, whose letter came with the approbation of the local rabbinical court, of which he himself was an occasional member. Samun did not mention the Sabbath, but he did delineate the core issues that could be used against music. He stated playing it could not be considered "emulating the Gentiles", as Decisor Joseph Colon Trabotto only applied the rule to that which had no positive value of its own. He also rebutted the possible argument that it breached the Beatified Sages' ban on music after the Ruin of Jerusalem, providing ample precedent and citations that this was meant against revelry alone.

In summer 1817, the Berlin Old Synagogue was closed down for renovation. Beer reopened his private association during August, drawing large crowds once more. At the same time, Israel Eduard Kley, a member of Jacobson's circle who served as preacher, left Berlin to assume the management of the new Jewish school in Hamburg. In the Hanseatic city he found a large audience interested in a reformed service. Kley was joined Seckel Isaac Fränkel and Meyer Israel Bresselau, community notables who were also scholars of considerable merit, and Gotthold Salomon, a pedagogue who became their preacher. They garnered support among the young and educated, and especially the women, who were barely taught Hebrew under traditional conventions and could not understand the prayers. On 17 December 1817, 65 Jewish households founded the "New Temple Association", which raised funds for the planned synagogue.

In the early months of 1818, tension was mounting in Berlin. Rabbi Meyer Weyl, irritated by the Beer association, sent letters of complaint to prominent Central European decisors in February and March. He wrote to Bezalel Ronsburg of Prague and Mordecai Benet of Nikolsburg, asking both to contact the Italian rabbis and request that they retract their responsa. He also turned to Akiba Eger for support, and the latter corresponded on the matter with his son-in-law, Moses Sofer of Pressburg, who was already famous for his intransigent Orthodoxy. Moshe Samet observed that the tone in the correspondence was rather calm, and debate still very theoretical: the rabbis outside Berlin were not yet much disturbed.

Beer enlisted the aid of Eliezer Liebermann, an obscure figure who claimed to have once been a rabbinic judge in Hungary. Liebermann repeated his master's actions in 1816. He sent letters to rabbis and scholars in his native land, reputed to be liberal. Eventually he received two that he found sufficiently lenient. One was from Moses Kunitz, a rabbinic judge from Óbuda, who composed a short, hesitant responsa in which he allowed the Sephardic pronunciation and the use of music instruments. He circumspectly commented that since it already was customary to have gentiles remove the plates and candles from tables on the Sabbath, having a non-Jew operate the organ on days of rest will not breach the Law.

A far more comprehensive approbation was given by Rabbi Aaron Chorin of Arad. Chorin was a well-known maverick; Samet noted that unlike many colleagues who harbored maskilic sympathies, he did not keep his to himself. Since a rabbinic tribunal had him recant in 1806, under the pain of being declared a heretic and have his beard shaved, he clashed repeatedly with other decisors, adopting glaringly lenient positions. His only patron was Rabbi Moses Münz of Óbuda. When hearing of Liebermann's letters, Münz warned Chorin to steer clear from the controversy, yet the latter ignored him. The rabbi of Arad composed a long, enthusiastic responsa, in which he fervently supported reform efforts, stating that he long regarded the noise and disorder in synagogues a great ill. While recommending they teach their sons the Holy Tongue, he noted that legal sources were quite clear on the permissibility of vernacular liturgy. He also allowed Sephardi pronunciation and separate prayer gatherings. Regarding the organ, he cited the same arguments that Samun and Recanati evoked. He also turned to two minority opinions mentioned in Orach Chayim 338:2 and 339:3, that sanctioned music on the Sabbath.

Liebermann added Chorin and Kunitz's letters to those of Samun and Recanati, from which he removed the dates and openings that indicated they were from 1816. He published the four in a compendium titled "Radiance of Justice" ("Nogah ha-Tzedek"). He also authored a long concluding chapter, "Radiant Light" ("Or Nogah") where he denounced the rabbis of his day. Liebermann mixed enlightened notions with quotes from nonconformist Jewish medieval philosophers, especially Leon of Modena. He attacked decisors for demonstrating legalistic rigidity, arrogance and apathy as many of the young turned away from religion. A minor point he made was justifying less mourning and prayers about the Jerusalem Temple, arguing these also constituted Hastening the End. He did not spare common Jews either, blaming them for neglecting their children's religious education. Liebermann determined that some prayers should be recited in German, but only where people were ignorant of Hebrew.

The pamphlet was a direct challenge to the rabbinical establishment. When "Radiance of Justice" appeared in Berlin it caused much controversy, owing mainly to Chorin's response, which was both enthusiastic and penned by a relatively high-ranking rabbi. On New Year (1–2 October) 1818, brawls between the Orthodox and Reform factions broke out in the main synagogue. However, it calmed quite quickly. Apart from being conservative in general, the Prussian authorities were concerned that any modification of Judaism would make it more attractive and reduce the rapid rate of conversions to Christianity. Goaded by Weyl, they quickly placed various limits on Beer and Gumperz. In 1823, the government permanently shut down the association. "Radiance of Justice" had little influence in Berlin; The "polemical storm" it did elicit, wrote Meyer, "swirled around the temple in Hamburg."

=== Hamburg and The Words of the Covenant ===
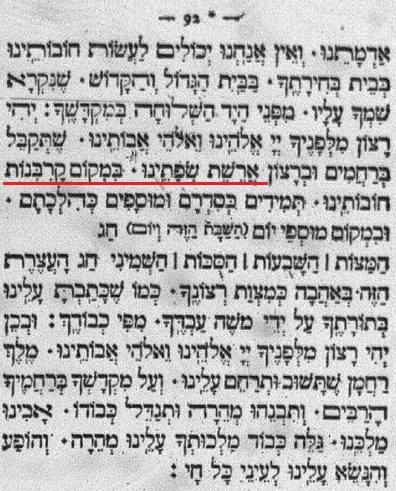
A segment of the 1818 Hamburg prayerbook. Stating "accept the uttering of our lips instead of our obligatory sacrifices" and omitting the traditional "O gather our dispersions... Conduct us unto Zion" passage.

On 18 October 1818, the "New Temple Association" inaugurated its synagogue, Qahal Bayit Chadash ("Congregation New House"), better known by its German name, Neuer Israelitischer Tempel, the New Israelite Temple. Apart from emulating virtually everything done in Berlin, they also reinstituted the ancient triennial cycle of Torah portions, as in old Israel, rather than the Babylonian annual one, thus shortening services.

Soon after, Bresselau and Fränkel published a new prayerbook which they authored for the community, "Order of Devotion", Seder ha-Avodah. This work, unlike its predecessor in Berlin, did not introduce merely eclectic changes. As Meyer noted, it was the "first comprehensive Reform liturgy." While not thoroughly systematic, the authors methodically excised or replaced segments referring to the future restoration of the sacrificial cult in Jerusalem by the Messiah. Some formulae pertaining to it were retained; in his later analysis, Simon Bernfeld argued that any expression that could have been interpreted metaphorically remained unscathed. The blessing "May our eyes see your return to Zion" was unchanged. Michael Meyer wrote: "The Reformers had not lost their love of Zion, but they did not desire to return or rebuild the Temple... Without question, the omission and alteration of Messianic passages was the most audacious innovation of the Hamburg reformers. It cast a doubt on a central principle of the Jewish faith." Bresselau, Fränkel and those who shared their views did not yet possess a comprehensive, alternative religious philosophy. They attempted to justify themselves by precedent and halakhic means. Their approach was rationalistic, believing their interpretation was correct, and they lacked the historicist understanding of the founders of Reform Judaism, who would follow them a generation later. But their new rite, for the first time, reflected its earliest tenet, an explicitly universalized Messianism.

The Hamburg rabbinical court, headed by the elderly judge Baruch ben Meir Oser of Prague (the city had no official rabbi since the death of Zebi Hirsch Zamosz in 1807), immediately proclaimed a ban on the new synagogue. The communal elders were divided. At the very same time, Liebermann's "Radiance of Justice" appeared. Though intended to defend the Berlin Reformers, the pamphlet could have served the same purpose in Hamburg, and public opinion was quick to perceive it as such. Oser and the other judges found themselves facing both a large swath of their community and Liebermann's tract. In winter 1818, they sought help from outside, writing lettres to rabbis across Central Europe and appealing to Italy as well. On 4 December Oser wrote Sofer in Pressburg, requesting assistance against "those who have devised a new rite... It is evident that they do not wish to ascend to Zion."

The response to the new temple was different than before. The Reform movement spread, establishing presence in a central Jewish community and mobilising rabbis in its service. It could not be dismissed as a handful of eccentrics any longer, with a genuine schism possible. The "Radiance of Justice" granted it legitimacy, undermining the authority of the Hamburg rabbis and potentially of the rabbinic establishment everywhere, demonstrating that halakhic scholars signed such a confrontational treatise. But beyond all that, "what severely disturbed the traditionalists" about the Reformers now, wrote Meyer, "was that they had not merely reinterpreted Messianism to tone down its particularism and reconcile it with patriotism. They had transferred it entirely and had given that expression in the prayerbook itself. The worship in Hamburg was for them a permanent substitute to the sacrificial cult in Jerusalem. For the champions of tradition, this was no mere heresy, it was a step beyond the pale."

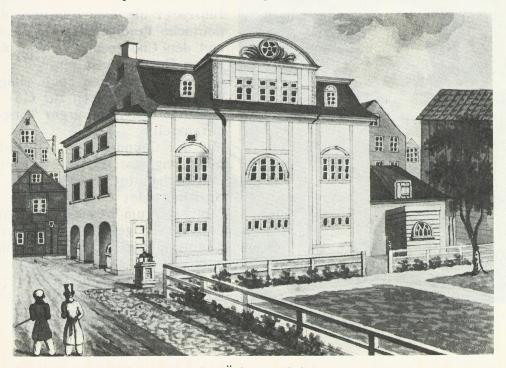
The Hamburg Temple in its original edifice, at the Brunnenstraße

Already in January 1819, the Italian communities responded to Oser's petitions, severely condemning the reformers, clarifying that most only allowed the organ and other innovations on a theoretical level and that their responses were given in 1816, without being aware of the situation. Rabbi Moses Sofer of Pressburg, who was to emerge as the foremost Orthodox leader during the dispute, requested Moses Münz to have Chorin recant. The latter relented under pressure, and wrote a retraction. He stated his rulings were sound, stressing that he reneged due to the omission of core prayers, of which he was ignorant. While extremely lenient, Chorin never withdrew from the belief in the restitution of sacrifices. Sofer eventually published only the retraction, without the self-exonerating preamble, enraging the rabbi of Arad. Chorin was also openly denounced by Mordecai Benet, who branded him unworthy of his title.

Liebermann traveled across the Austrian Empire in late 1818, publicizing his views. While the Orthodox were in the midst of preparing a concerted condemnation of Kley's temple, he found support in Vienna, where local Jewish notables were interested in his suggestions. Communal elders considered building a new, Hamburg-inspired synagogue and appointing Chorin to head it. Another one intent to seize the moment was the radical maskil Peter Beer of Prague, who held views which far exceeded those of the Reformers, approaching Deism. Throughout 1819, he and his associate Herz Homberg petitioned the Imperial Court repeatedly to oblige the Jews to pray only in German. These moves heightened the traditionalist's sense of urgency. Even the moderate, relatively open Italian rabbis "shared their Central European colleagues' view that Judaism was imperiled, that the threat of schism was real."

Oser already received angered clarifications from several communities. But in March and April 1819, the most senior Italian authority, Rabbi Abraham Eliezer ha-Levi of Triest, journeyed the peninsula from his city as far south as Ragusa. In every community, he collected letters of reprimand and condemnation against the Hamburg reformers that were subsequently printed in Eleh Divrei Habrit (Words of the Covenant). Shem-Tov Samun criticized "those who rebelled" against the rabbis and prevalent customs of their community although previously he had explicitly permitted the organ in the synagogue (first letter in "Nogah Hazedek"). Recanati's response was not recorded. While not necessarily reneging on their former rulings, the Italians elucidated that they set many limitations and that those were more theoretical than concrete permits, adding harsh attacks against the "sectarians and schismatics". Lois C. Dubin argued that their stance was not just a reaction to the threat upon the authority of tradition and rabbinic jurisdiction: "they had always spoken on behalf of custom, continuity and tradition. In 1816, they had as well, drawing upon Italian practice and halakhic arguments... Though they were misconstrued as supporters of reform, they really did not favour the change of customary practice. What confused German modernizers was that they failed to see that the Italians were speaking from a different context and tradition. What was customary in one locale was innovative in the other; what looked radical here, could in fact be defended by tradition elsewhere."

Ha-Levi, who summarized and edited the various Italian responsa, was exceptionally harsh. His final rulings, sent to Hamburg to bolster that of the local court and endorsed by fourteen communities (including Venice, Ferrara and Florence), forbade any musical accompaniment whatsoever, whether on weekdays or on the Sabbath. Even Oser and his two fellow judges only banned it on the day of rest and festivals.

The traditionalist reaction to the Hamburg temple was delineated by several concerns. The Messianic issue was of supreme importance to the Orthodox, immeasurably more than any element which the "Radiance of Justice" sought to countenance. In a private tract he published later on, Rabbi Abraham Löwenstamm of Emden castigated those who abandoned this belief not only as heretics, but as worse from Christians and Muslims who at least believed in a redeemer, equal to Idolaters. However, this was a contentious matter that could be interpreted as disloyalty to the states in which they resided and be used against them. All references to the omission of these prayers were obfuscated and accompanied by long declarations of fealty to the kings and sovereigns, and explanations that this faith did not conflict with earnest patriotism and identification with one's nation. Baruch Mevorach observed that no less than their opponents, the Orthodox, albeit clinging fiercely and dogmatically to the restoration of the sacrifices, return to Zion and every other detail, faced the need to dilute the particularist tinge of the redemption ideal. They too stressed universalist facets and the manner in which it would benefit all mankind, taking care to clarify that the yearning for the Temple was a utopian concept.

In addition, the rabbis had to reassert their authority against those who sought to undermine it in general. The main theme underlying most of the letters sent to Hamburg was not to contend with any specific components of the new worship style, but to deny the Israelite Temple and any attempt to emulate it legitimacy by reinforcing every feature of traditional conduct. The rulings often used arguments along the line of "the Custom of Israel is Law", and lambasted those who meddled with received forms and sought to abandon the ways of their ancestors. Quotes like "we cannot devise what our fathers did not contemplate", "cursed are those who innovate" and the like permeated the rulings. The most unremitting promulgator of this approach was Moses Sofer, who had long since declared that in an era of growing heresy, even the slightest minutiae of tradition had to be relentlessly upheld against those who sought to challenge rabbinic authority. In 1796, he protested that even something certainly known to be "custom of ignoramuses", prevalent only due to a mistake by the unlearned masses, must not be abrogated.

The 1819 Hamburg controversy signified a new pattern of thought on the part of the conservatives, one that the rabbi of Pressburg already embraced. Their polemics were not a mere continuation of legalistic argumentation, but a self-conscious, concerted backlash intended to safeguard the very authority of tradition. As such, most historians regard it to be the beginning of Orthodox Judaism as a modern movement, a defined, beleaguered perception which could not merely perpetuate old modes of thought. It had to defend itself actively against encroaching deviation in a world where the rabbis lacked all their old legal means of enforcement.

Sofer had no qualms about his ideology. Mordecai Benet, in his letters to Hamburg, attempted to construe a complex halakhic defence of the exclusive use of Hebrew in prayer, enlisting both intricate mystical claims about the importance of enunciating the holy names and the need to preserve the language. These proved an easy target for the partisans of the temple. Sofer, however, blandly stated that the German prayers "were not of great significance", but banned them outright because it was an innovation, stressing the difference between him and the Reformers were a matter of principle, not of specific practices. He wanted to ban the organ on the same grounds, but eventually accepted Benet's argument it constituted "emulating the gentiles." The decisors were also faced with another problem. An old report surfaced, revealing that the Maisel Synagogue in Prague employed an organ during the 17th century and played to accompany Lekhah Dodi. In their polemic, they concluded that only one among Prague's nine synagogues – in fact, the Altneuschule used one as well during the 18th century – had the instrument and they did not repair it when it malfunctioned. Therefore, the Orthodox argued, they must have become aware it constituted an "gentile ordinance". Since 1819, the organ became a symbol of Reform, and the most obvious demarcation between traditional and non-traditional synagogues in Germany, though it would be sanctioned by mainstream rabbis in Italy and France.

Some forty responsa condemning the New Israelite Temple were received and edited into a single compendium, These are the Words of the Covenant (Ele divrei ha-brit), which was published in Hamburg in May 1819. It was centred on the ruling of the city rabbinic court, stating that in order to "seal the breach and erect a fence around the Law", to "undo a new Law, fabricated by some unlearned individuals who are not scholars", three ordinances were decreed: it was forbidden to meddle with the order of prayer, to pray in another language or to employ a musical instrument in the synagogue on Sabbath and festivals, not even by a gentile. The contributors to Words of the Covenant served across Central Europe and Italy: from Naphtali Hirsch Katzenellenbogen of Wintzenheim in the west to Yaakov Lorberbaum of Lissa in the east, from Samuel Bernstein of Amsterdam in the north to Solomon Malah of Leghorn in the south. While all were generally harsh in tone, Rabbi Eleasar Löw of Triesch conceded some of the Reformers' claims, agreeing that the disorder and cacophony in traditional synagogues had to be dealt with. One responsa which was not in included by Sofer came from Ephraim Zalman Margolis of Brody, far in the east. Margolis, in an undisturbed traditional surrounding, debated the matter of Hebrew in prayer in a theoretical, almost detached manner. It arrived too late, and the rabbi of Pressburg found it too inconclusive.

=== Conclusion ===
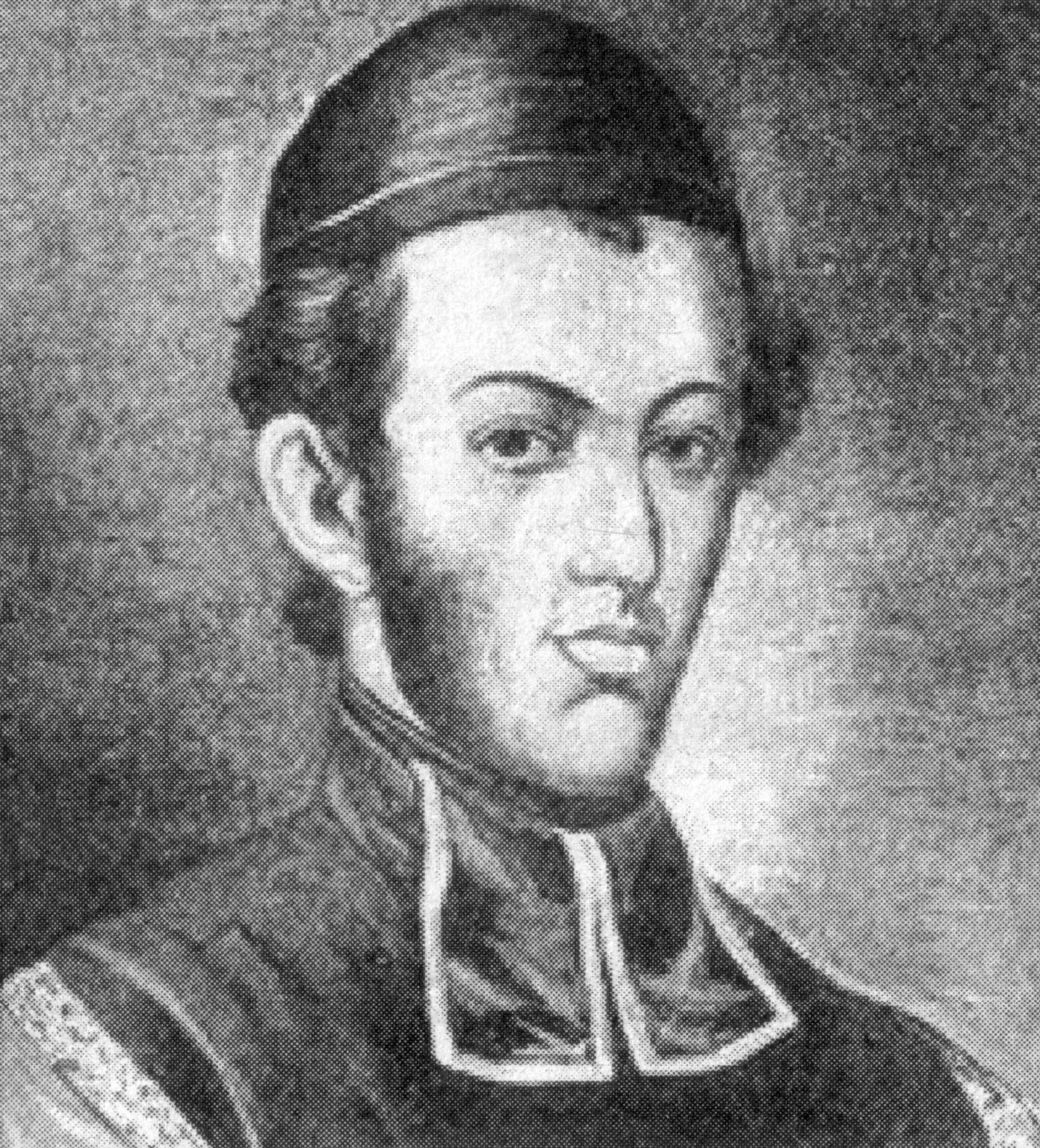
Hacham Isaac Bernays, in his clerical vestments

Words of the Covenant did not end the controversy. The New Israelite Temple's congregants continued to attend it, little affected by the massive protest. Bresselau set out to find every precedent and lenient ruling he could muster and compiled About the Prayer of the Israelites in the Vernacular ("Ueber die Gebete der Israeliten in der Landessprache"), in which he attempted to rebut many of the Orthodox arguments. He also authored a barbed Hebrew satire named A Sword Avenging the Covenant (Herev Nokemet Nakam Brit; Leviticus 26:25), portraying the elderly rabbis as senile and indifferent to religious apathy among the young. Rabbi Löb Reinitz of Moravia countered Bresselau's pamphlet with his Flaming Sword (Genesis 3:24), denouncing the Reformers as heretics. Not only the strictly Orthodox turned against the Israelite Temple: moderate maskil Nachman Berlin of Lissa authored two tracts criticising them severely, and so did Salomon Jacob Cohen, the last editor of HaMeassef. Young Samuel David Luzzatto composed a satire of his own against the Temple.

The rabbinic coalition that was established to compose Words of the Covenant did succeed on other fronts. Chorin relapsed in mid-1820, and went to Vienna to assist Liebermann. He published a book named A Timely Word (Davar be-I'to) aimed at convincing the authorities to allow them to build a Hamburg-style synagogue. He lambasted Benet, depicting him as an overbearing tyrant, and protested that his preamble had been removed by Sofer. On 20 January 1820 the Imperial Court accepted Homberg and Beer's petition and decreed that Jews will now only pray in the vernacular. Ha-Levi in Trieste, Benet in Nikolsburg and the rabbinic court of Prague interceded, appealing to the Emperor himself in early 1821. By April, due to concerted effort and ceaseless petitions, The government relented and ameliorate the conditions, requiring only adding a translation to prayerbooks. They also rejected Liebermann's proposals, forcing him to leave the capital. He was not heard from again. Chorin also returned to his small community in disappointment. He continued to clash with Sofer, who would occasionally force him to recant his views in the following decades.

But the dispute in Hamburg itself was yet to be resolved. After the community was almost torn asunder by polemics, and nearly three years in which the New Temple attracted large crowds, the board of elders finally decided to accept a solution promulgated by Lazarus Jacob Riesser (father of Gabriel Riesser) from the first days of the crisis. They dismissed the three elderly rabbinic judges and hired a permanent new chief rabbi. They chose young Isaac Bernays, one of the first rabbis who also went to university. He was appointed on 30 October 1821. Bernays represented a new generation: while he studied under Rabbi Abraham Bing, he was also thoroughly modern and acculturated. He immediately reformed services in the old synagogue at Neuer Steinweg. Bernays wore clerical vestments, delivered edifying sermons in pure German, had a choir accompany prayers and introduced strict decorum. He forbade spitting on the floor, screaming, stomping, loudly correcting the reader during the cantillation and the like. His conduct drew many of the Temple's congregants back to the old community, practically resolving the conflict.

He was modern in another, more significant aspect; his contract banned him from cursing, punishing or denying charity funds from transgressors. He lacked any jurisdiction in civil affairs from the start. Ismar Schorsch noted that twenty years after the retirement of his predecessor Raphael Cohen, whose authority was undermined by complaints to the government on the part of nonobservant members, Bernays symbolized the transformation of the rabbinate. From an institution entrusted with judging, collecting taxes and enforcing Halakha upon all Jews, their concerns were transferred solely to the religious sphere, created when new realities engendered a secular, neutral one, unregulated by religious law, something which was foreign to traditional Jewish society. Even the title "rabbi" was denied to him by the community, and he was given the designation of "Hacham", like his Sephardi equivalents. His contract also specifically forbade him from interfering in the matters of the Temple congregation, whose members paid both their own membership dues and taxes to the community. The two groups coexisted side by side.

Bernays and his close associate Jacob Ettlinger of Altona are regarded by historians as the founding fathers of "Neo-Orthodoxy", or Torah im Derech Eretz, the ideology which sought to combine traditional religious attitudes with utter modernization. Their most famous and prominent pupil, Samson Raphael Hirsch, was theologically dogmatic and stressed that even the slightest minutiae of practice originated at the revelation at Mount Sinai. But, as Schorsch commented, "Like the spokesmen for Reform, Hirsch dropped all demands for judicial autonomy and continuance of Jewish civil law. He insisted upon the wholly religious character of Judaism, reduced the significance of the periods of Jewish national independence, and divested the messianic concept of political overtones. With a rationalism and Hegelianism that he fully shared with the reformers, whom he detested, Hirsch too emphasized the ethical content and universal mission of Judaism."

Words of the Covenant, and the demonstrable willingness of the Orthodox to exert their influence, deterred the radical elements in Vienna. Eventually, a new synagogue was opened in 1826. Isaac Noah Mannheimer came to serve as supervisor. Mannheimer, who conducted "devotion" ceremonies as a Jewish school director at Copenhagen and later visited the Beer and Kley temples, developed a decidedly conservative bent. Determined to preserve unity by accommodating the traditionalists, he introduced in the Viennese Stadttempel a decorous, yet carefully crafted rite, that combined music and abridged liturgy but none of which was condemned in Hamburg. Michael L. Miller added: "these innovations could all be reconciled with the Code of the Set Table... Mannheimer managed to strike a 'golden mean', without violating Halakha". A similarly restrained aestheticization of prayer forms, with no dogmatic implications or breaching of legalistic constraints, was instituted in the new Spanish Synagogue at Prague by the even more conservative Rabbi Michael Sachs. The model presented by these two congregations became popular throughout the Austrian Empire.

During 1820, the New Israelite Temple established an affiliated prayer group in the Leipzig Trade Fair. Services were held annually, and knowledge of them spread across Europe via the Jewish merchants. Another short-lived association which attempted to emulate the Berlin-Hamburg model was active in Karlsruhe between 1820 and 1823. But although many synagogues gradually began to adopt aesthetic reforms, those were limited and strictly in the external sphere. The prayerbook, especially the ideology behind it, and even the organ on Saturday remained confined to Congregation New House. "Here alone during the 1820s and 1830s there had been a clearly nonorthodox Jewish religious service... Everyone agreed that it stood 'isolated'," concluded Meyer, "a beacon whose light no one seemed eager to welcome."

== Second dispute ==
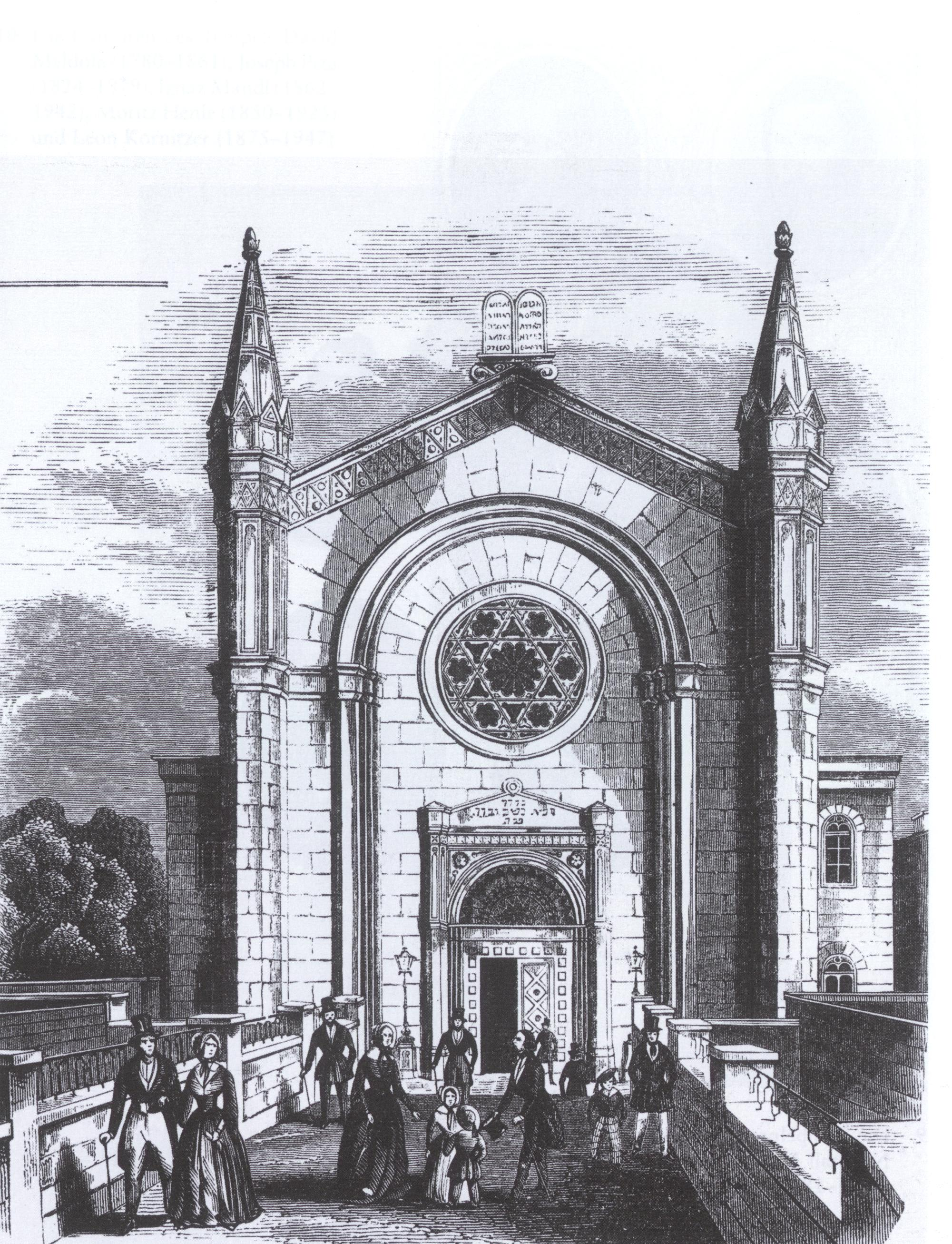
The new Temple at the Poolstraße

In the two decades that followed after the end of the first controversy, the social and cultural processes which led to the establishment of the Israelite Temple ripened and intensified, engulfing most of German Jews. An entire generation went to modern schools; levels of personal observance, which were steadily declining for many years, now reached a critical turning point. In the 1840s, the majority could be classified a non-Orthodox. The last traditional yeshiva, that of Fürth, closed in 1828. Higher education became mandatory for rabbis both by government decree and popular demand. Young university graduates slowly replaced the old religious leadership. Reform tendencies, limited to the upper crust of acculturated laymen twenty years earlier, now permeated the rabbinate itself.

Many of its members were steered by the social pressures of a public losing interest in its religion and the intellectual challenge of Judaic studies (Wissenschaft des Judentums), pioneered by Leopold Zunz and his circle. Subjecting tradition to scientific scrutiny, under the influence of liberal Protestant theologians who had done the same to Christianity, various concepts – like the Resurrection of the Dead, the mentions of Angels in the liturgy and the like – taken for granted were now critically reevaluated, and condemned as alien imports from ancient middle-eastern pagan religions. The most radical partisan of Wissenschaft was the young Rabbi Abraham Geiger, who launched the irreverent journal Wissenschaftliche Zeitschrift für Jüdische Theologie, where Judaism was critically analyzed with little concern for received forms or beliefs. By 1837, the liberal wing was sufficiently strong for Geiger to convene a group of like-minded rabbis in Wiesbaden and suggest radical measures to bridge the gap between most of the Jewish public and its religion.

On this background, in April 1839, the spiritual leadership of the Hamburg Temple decided to draft a second edition of its prayerbook, indeed the only new Reform liturgy since the former. Approaching its semi-jubilee, the directorate believed it was high time to break out of the isolation and gain the influence they believed accorded their association. The commission in charge comprised Gotthold Salomon, Eduard Kley, Bresselau and Fränkel. Kley resigned from the temple, replaced as preacher by Naphtali Frankfurter, and Bresselau died on 25 December. They declared that the new tome must express the "pure teaching of our ancestral religion", and all that contrasted it "must be removed." In comparison to the Wissenschaft-inspired rabbinical cadre the Hamburg commission was still quite dilettante, lacking a well-defined ideological stance, a matter which little concerned them. It also had to accommodate a diverse congregation and maintain its legitimacy within the wider community.

The second edition, published in August 1841, introduced few innovations. It both restored several traditional formulae, like the hymnal verses and some petitions for Jerusalem (though in small print and untranslated) and omitted others, producing a rite that altogether was not more radical than the 1818 version. Yet this time, the authors declared they hoped that the prayerbook would be adopted "in all communities where the strive for progress reigned alongside a genuine fear of God." In addition, The constituency of the Temple grew, and the old building was overcrowded. In 1840 they requested the Hamburg Senate to be allowed to build a new, 640-seat sanctuary in the Poolstraße. They also wrote the main community, arguing they were due-paying members and asked for it to aid in financing the project. The outreach efforts of the Reform party alerted Bernays into action, in spite of his contract.

On 16 October 1841, the Hacham issued an announcement that the new prayerbook did not fulfill the minimal requirements under religious law, and those who used it were not meeting the obligation of worship. The Temple directorate were quick to counter Bernays. Emulating the Orthodox in 1819, they shortly marshaled twelve responsa from liberal rabbis and preachers that, while not all in favour of the volume, lambasted Bernays for placing a ban and refuting his halakhic arguments. The letters were published in a collection named Theologische Gutachten liber das Gebetbuch nach dem Gebrauche des neuen israelitischen Tempelvereins in Hamburg. The issue entangled all shades of the rabbinate in Central Europe, engendering a heated polemic: Abraham Geiger, who wrote a letter in support of the Hamburg congregation, stressed in his writing that more than the specific issue at hand, he became involved because the controversy surfaced the deepest religious debates of its era. Gotthold Salomon published another tract of his own, where he rebutted most of the rabbi's claims on legal grounds, but acknowledged that the meddling with the Messianic ideal constituted a severe aberration.

Rabbi Zecharias Frankel from Dresden, the most prominent of those who occupied the middle position between the Reform and strictly Orthodox, dismissed the ban, demonstrating that the book contained all obligatory prayers. He also declared himself opposed to the tome, for its contents were in contrast to the people's spirit. The belief in a personal Messiah, wrote Frankel, was ancient and hallowed. He ridiculed Bernays both for resorting to such means instead of attempting to convince the public by reasoning, and stressing legalist arguments – which the prayerbook could withstand – when he should have debated the principled matters of faith. Neither did the Rabbi of Dresden base his argument on rigid Orthodox notions, but on the sanctity of collective sentiment, a key idea in his philosophy, which he would later term "Positive-Historical Judaism", considered by Conservative Judaism as its antecedent. Aside from his condemnation of Bernays' ban, he conducted a similar exchange, also negative, with Salomon, criticising the prayerbook. He opposed the tendency to turn Judaism into a "world religion", universal and devoid of particularism, arguing for the centrality of the notion that the People Israel shall one day regain its own existence at "a small corner of the earth."

David Fine noted "this was vintage Frankel, arguing for tradition not from the standpoint of halakhic minutiae but from the commanding voice of nation, people, history and custom... it stands as an early example for the burgeoning split between Reformers and the Positive-Historical School", which was concluded when Frankel exited the 1845 Frankfurt rabbinical conference and terminated any connection with the other camp. Isaac Noah Mannheimer closely echoed Frankel, with whom he shared much in common (David Ellenson termed Mannheimer "Positive-Historical") denouncing both Bernays' pamphlet and the prayerbook itself.

Another one who came to the aid of the Temple was the Samuel Holdheim, who would thereafter distinguish himself as a radical Reform rabbi. Holdheim defended two aspects of the new prayerbook. He cited the conventional halakhic sources for praying in German; on the matter of the sacrificial cult he quoted Maimonides' Guide of the Perplexed, where sacrifices were described as a primitive form of worship meant to allow the Israelites contact God in a manner still common and acceptable in ancient, barbaric times. Holdheim attempted to grant this philosophical work a higher status than Maimonides' legal rulings that the sacrifices shall be restored.

The most important participant was Geiger, who published a lengthy treatise on the matter, Der Hamburger Tempelstreit, eine Zeitfrage. He clarified from the start that Bernays did not interest him in particular, mocking the "medieval" form in which he chose to protest. He was also angered by the fact that in his book, Der Biblische Orient, Bernays did present a model of historical progress in the Jewish prayer rite, wondering why the rabbi will not understand that a reformulation was now necessary due to the same process of change with the times. But for Geiger, the subject was his conservative rivals, mainly Frankel, and the authors of the prayerbook. He devoted his book to a history of the development of Jewish prayer, demonstrating how the various layers emerged through the ages. Geiger dismissed any sentimental romanticism accorded to it by the people, arguing that it has always been subject to profound change. On the other hand, he criticised the Hamburg Temple editors for not fully replacing the Messianic concept. While they omitted much, they retained some petitions. He believed they should have adopted the alternative already promulgated in scholarly Reform circles, that of a Messianic age of global harmony. Geiger added they should have also excised all segments referring to beliefs already considered irrational, like the resurrection.

Fine emphasized how the 1841–2 debate delineated the positions around which the three different factions would coalesce in the coming decade, the most crucial era in the history of modern Jewish denominations. The main issue was the divine origin and, consequently, immutability of the chain of traditional interpretation and ruling, independent of critical analysis of past circumstances. "Geiger could not understand that for Bernays, the study of history did not necessarily dictate contemporary praxis. For him, historical research was permitted, even lauded, but results had no halakhic authority. This is the form that modern Orthodoxy would eventually take under Hildesheimer... The difference between Reform Judaism that stemmed from Geiger and the Positive-Historical (and later, Conservative) Judaism that stemmed from Frankel was whether history commanded for change or conservatism. The lessons of research could be disputed, but both of them believed history to be the source of authority."

While the Temple congregation enlisted massive support, Bernays only received aid from Jacob Ettlinger. The polemic subsided, especially after the great fire of 4–8 May 1842, which destroyed Hamburg. The new edifice of the Temple, in the Poolstraße, was dedicated in 1844. The route of the Orthodox effectively demonstrated how strong their rivals became, paving the way for the Reform rabbinical conferences of 1844-6, led by Geiger, which were a key event in the formation of Reform Judaism. In the second one, at Frankfurt – which Frankel left after a day, when it was declared that there was no "objective obligation" to maintain Hebrew in prayer – the majority voted to officially accept that while the Messianic ideal was important, all notions of a Return to Zion and restoration of the sacrificial cult must be excised.
