= Gumplin =

Gumplin (Hebrew: גּוּמְפְּלִין) was a German Hebrew satirical poet of unknown date. The only poem of his that has been preserved is Shir la'ag al bnei Reinus (שיר לעג על־בני רינוס), a satire of seven strophes, ending with a refrain in which he very wittily criticizes the inhabitants of the Rhine Province. The name "Gumplin" is given in acrostic. Abraham Geiger published the poem, together with a German translation, in his Melo Chofnajim.
