= Sonderling =

Sonderling is a surname. Notable people with the surname include:

- Jacob Sonderling (1878–1964), German and American rabbi
- Keith Sonderling (born 1982), American attorney
