= Ludwig Geiger =

German author and historian (1848–1919)

- Born: Lazarus Abraham Geiger; 5 June 1848; Breslau, Silesia, Prussia
- Died: 9 February 1919 (aged 70); Berlin, Prussia, Germany
- Occupation: Historian
- Spouse: Martha Stettiner
- Children: Artur Geiger; Dora Geiger; Ilse Geiger; Edith Geiger; Emilie Geiger
- Parent(s): Abraham Geiger and Emilie Oppenheim

Signature
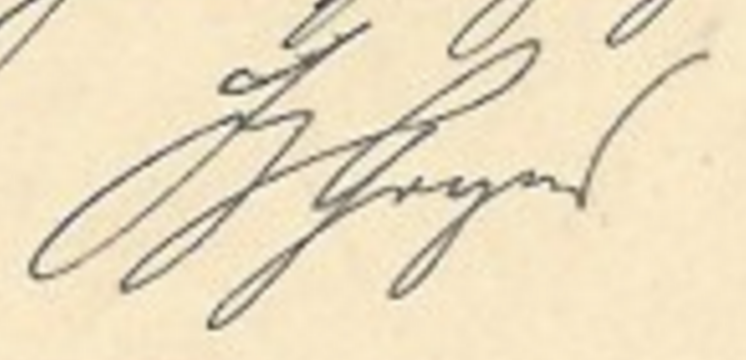

Ludwig Geiger (born Lazarus Abraham Geiger, also called Ludwig Moritz Philipp Geiger; 5 June 1848 – 9 February 1919) was a German author and historian.

== Life ==
Ludwig Geiger was born at Breslau, Silesia, a son of Abraham Geiger. After study at Heidelberg, Göttingen, and Bonn, he became docent in history at Berlin in 1873 and in 1880 was appointed to a chair of modern history there.

Geiger's more important researches have been concerned with the history of humanism, to which he contributed such studies as Nikolaus Ellenbog, ein Humanist und Theolog des sechzehnten Jahrhunderts (1870); Johann Reuchlin, sein Leben und seine Werke (1871); Petrarca (1874), an examination of Petrarch's significance as author and scholar; and Renaissance und Humanismus in Italien und Deutschland (1882). He also revised Jakob Burckhardt's Die Kultur der Renaissance in Italien (seventh edition, two volumes, Leipzig, 1899).

In 1880, Geiger began the publication of the Goethe-Jahrbuch, and from 1886–1892 was proprietor and an editor of the Zeitschrift für Geschichte der Juden in Deutschland (five volumes), in connection with which subject he published Das Studium der hebräischen Sprache in Deutschland vom Ende des 15ten bis zur Mitte des 16ten Jahrhunderts (1870) and Geschichte der Juden in Berlin (1871).

== Works ==
Geiger wrote:

- Vorträge und Versuche (1890);
- Berlin, 1688–1840 (1893–1895);
- Das junge Deutschland und die preussische Zensur (1900);
- Bettina von Arnim und Friedrich Wilhelm IV (1902);
- Aus Chamissos Frühzeit (1905);
- Goethe und Zelters Briefwechsel (1905);
- Chamissos Leben (1907);
- Chamissos Werke (1907);
- Der Briefwechsel Goethes mit Humboldt (1908);
- Charlotte von Schiller (1908).
