= Gotthold Salomon =

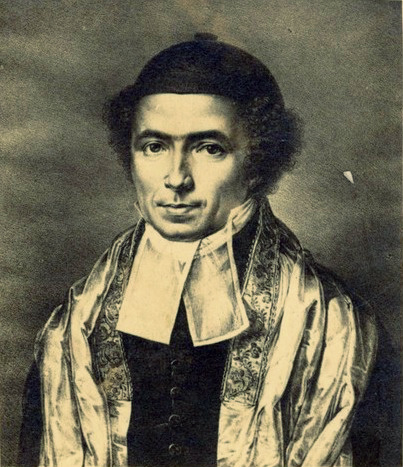
Gotthold Salomon

Gotthold Salomon (born as Schlomo Salman ben Lippmann haLewi; November 1, 1784 in Sandersleben (Anhalt-Dessau) – November 17, 1862 in Hamburg) was a German Jewish rabbi, politician and Bible translator.

Following on the work of Moses Mendelssohn, Salomon was the first Jew to translate the complete Old Testament into High German, under the title Deutsche Volks- und Schulbibel für Israeliten (1837) ("German People's and School Bible for Israelites"). He served as preacher in the Hamburg Temple, and partook in the public dispute around it in 1841.
