= Jacob Sonderling =

German-American rabbi (1878–1964)

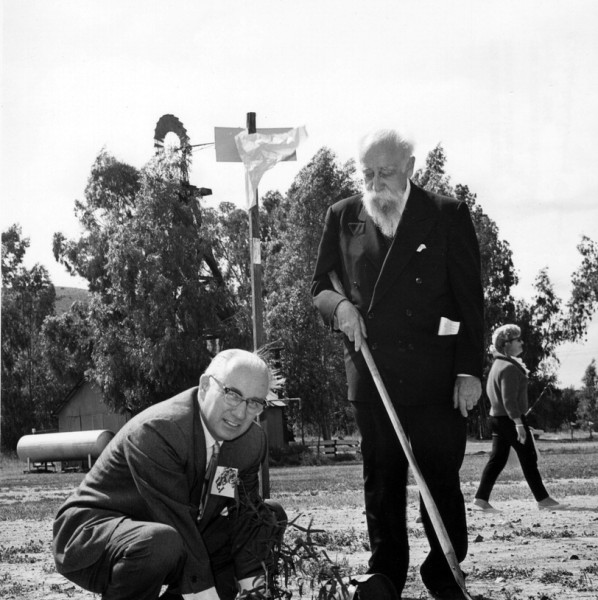
Jacob Sonderling Tree planting Ceremony 1964 in Simi Valley

Jacob Sonderling (19 October 1878 – 30 September 1964) was a German and American Rabbi. He was born in a chassidic family and was an early Zionist (Klal Yisrael). His aim was to combine art and religion.

Sonderling was born in Lipine, now part of Świętochłowice. He wrote his Ph.D. dissertation about the logic lessons of Kant. He was a preacher at Hamburg Temple with David Leimdörfer. In World War I, he was Field Rabbi in the Hindenburg army and emigrated to the United States in 1923.

After his arrival in the US, he served as a rabbi in New York and Chicago. In Los Angeles he was founder of the Fairfax Temple and helped Jewish immigrants with music commissions. He died, aged 85, in Los Angeles.

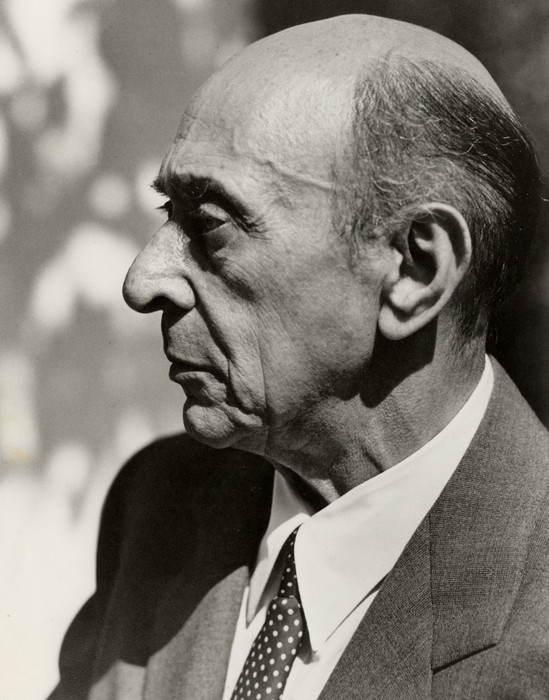
Arnold Schoenberg

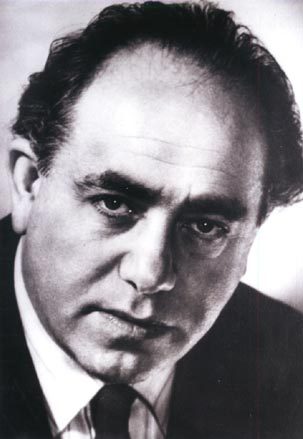
Erich Zeisl

== Sources ==
- Michael Berenbaum: SONDERLING, JACOB. In: Encyclopaedia Judaica, 2. Aufl. Band 19, Detroit, New York u.a. 2007, ISBN 978-0-02-865947-3, p 13
- Die neueren Bestrebungen des Hamburger Tempels., in: Neue Jüdische Monatshefte 3 (1918)
- Festrede am 29. August 1920 bei: Lorenz, Ina: Die Hamburger Juden zur Zeit der Weimarer Republik. Eine Dokumentation, 2 Bde., Hamburg 1987, p 696-733
- The JEWS are changing their music. in: Los Angeles Times Sunday Magazine, 1938
- (mit Ernst Toch, Erich Wolfgang Korngold, Arnold Schönberg) Dramatized Seder Services. 1943
- Art in Religion. 1943
- Five Gates: Casual Notes for an Autobiography. in: American Jewish Archives 16/2 (November 1964), p 107–123.
- Max Nussbaum: Jacob Sonderling, in: Proceedings of the Central Conference of American Rabbis (1965)
- Andreas Brämer: Judentum und religiöse Reform. Der Hamburger Israelitische Tempel 1817-1938. Dölling und Galitz Verlag, Hamburg 2000 ISBN 3-933374-78-2
- Forum: Bay Ridge Jewish Center, Blogbeiträge mit einer Postkarte, die Sonderling als Feldprediger September 1914 zeigt. Weblinks und Detailinformationen.
- Rede Alfred Gottschalks mit Zitaten von Sonderling.
- Jonathan D. Sarna: The Debate over Mixed Seating in the American Synagogue in: Jack Wertheimer (hrsg.): The American Synagogue, Cambridge 1987 p 380-394
- The New York Times: RABBI SONDERLING, ZIONIST AIDED HERZL 1. Oktober 1964
- Schlomo Friedrich Rülf: Ströme im dürren Land. Erinnerungen. Deutsche Verlags-Anstalt, Stuttgart 1964
- Garden of Memories (Author): Jacob Sonderling S.39)
- Zeitungsblatt Die Westküste 19.September 1941. Deutsche Nationalbibliothek.
