= Seckel Isaac Fränkel =

Seckel Isaac Fränkel (1765–1835) was a German-Jewish communal activist and scholar. In 1818, when the new Hamburg Temple was formally inaugurated, Fränkel, with Meyer Israel Bresselau, published a new siddur (prayer book) for the Temple, considered the first Reform liturgy. The siddur was known as "Seder ha-'Abodah, Minhag Ḳehal Bayit Ḥadash" ("Ordnung der Oeffentlichen Andacht für die Sabbath und Festtage des Ganzen Jahres, nach dem Gebrauche des Neuen Tempel-Vereins") and was written in both Hebrew and German. The reading began from left to right and the Hebrew pronunciation was Sephardi.

He was also translated most of the Jewish apocrypha from Greek into Hebrew (1830).

== Works ==
- כתובים אחרונים ("Later Scriptures") Ketuvim aḥaronim: ha-noda`im be-shem Apoḳrifa asher lo nod`u... (Latin: Hagiographa posteriora: denominata Apocrypha, hactenus Israelitis ignota, nunc autem e textu Gracco in linguam Hebraicam convertit atque in lucem emisit Seckel Isaac Fraenkel), Leipzig, 1830
