= Moritz Henle =

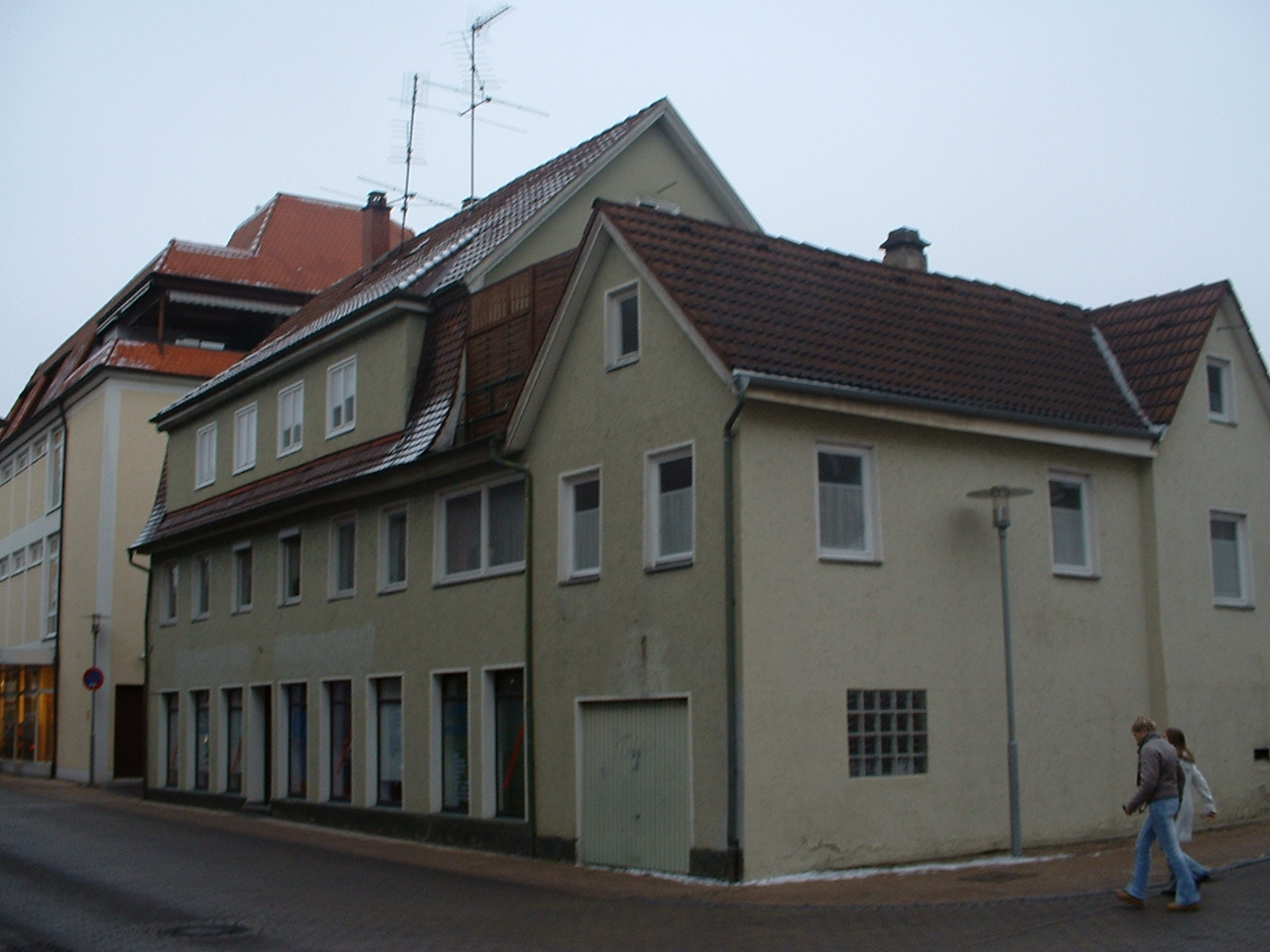
Birthplace of Moritz Henle in Laupheim

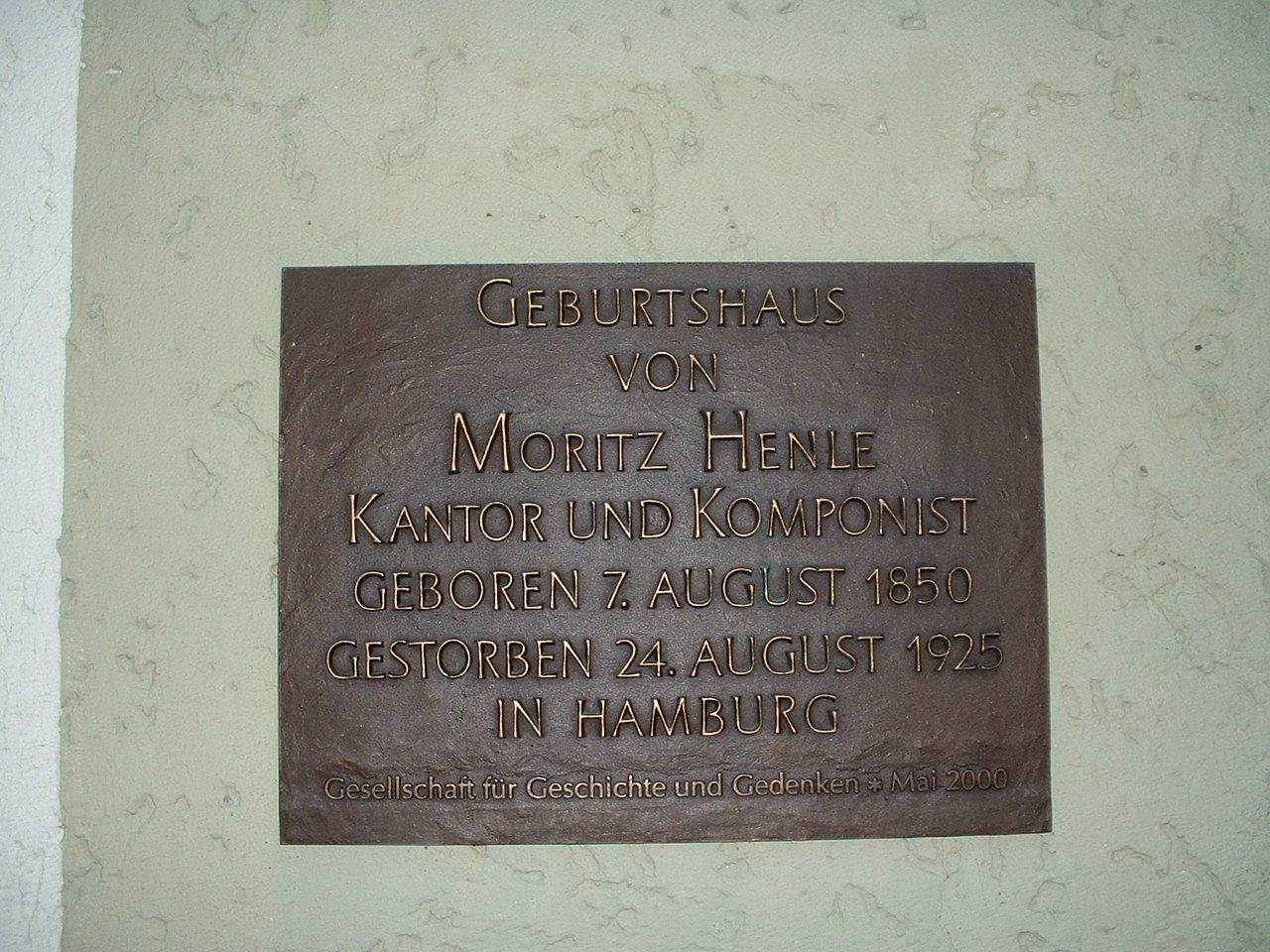
Commemorative plaque in Laupheim

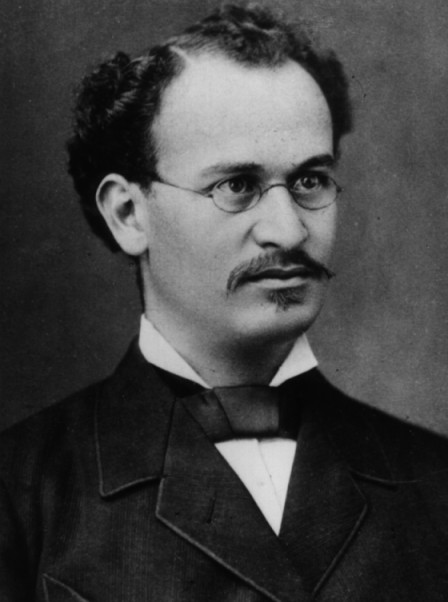
Moritz Henle in 1882

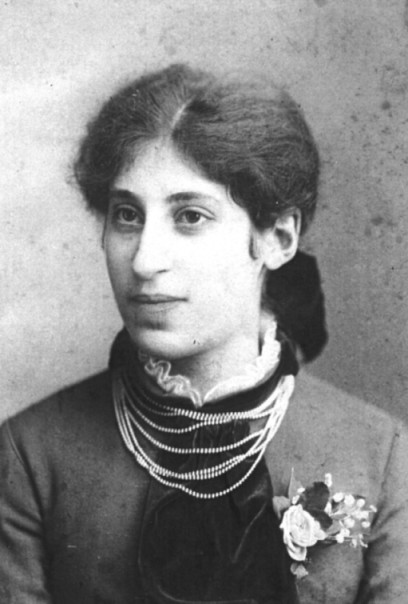
Caroline Henle in 1882

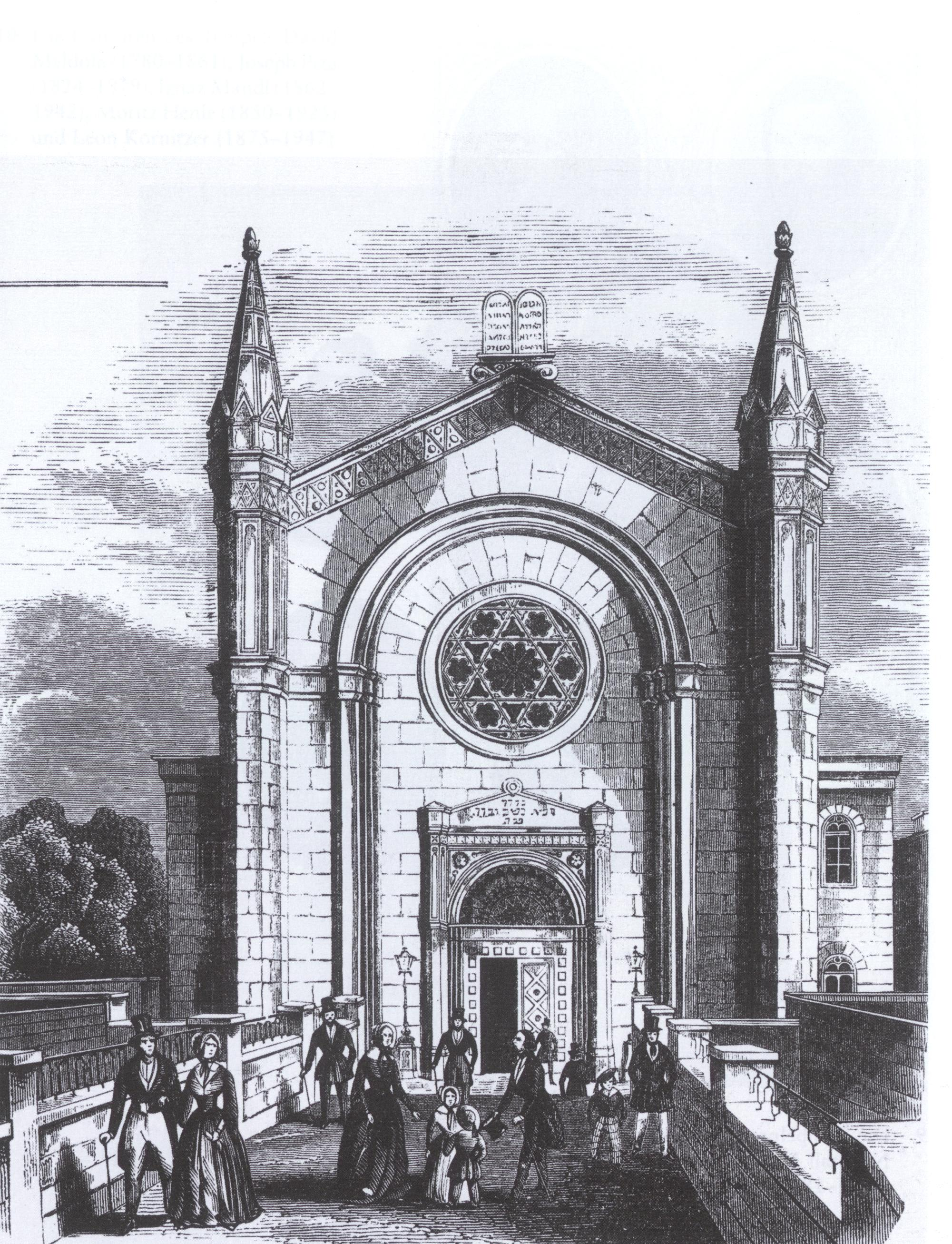
Hamburg Temple on Poolstraße, ca. 1850

Moritz Henle (7 August 1850 – 24 August 1925) was a prominent German composer of liturgical music and cantor of the Jewish reform movement.

Henle was born in the Upper Swabian town of Laupheim at a time when Laupheim had the largest Jewish community in the Kingdom of Württemberg. He was the seventh of eleven children. The family of his mother Klara Adler had been residents of Laupheim since the 18th century. In 1847 she married Elkan Henle, who had come to Laupheim from Ichenhausen. Elkan Henle was a highly respected master glazier who designed and executed the new Protestant prayer room at Großlaupheim Castle in 1847. Remaining evidence of Elkan Henle's artistic interest is the portal of the Jewish cemetery in Laupheim, which was designed by him.

From an early age, Henle showed a talent for music. He was a member of the boys choir at the synagogue in Laupheim. He was interested in learning to play the violin and the piano and was encouraged by his parents in these efforts. Due to initial financial help from Simon Heinrich Steiner, one of the co-founders of Hopsteiner, Moritz Henle was able to join the conservatoire at Stuttgart, where he attended lessons in piano, violin and singing. However, after two years Henle had to leave the conservatoire because his parents could no longer afford its tuition. Henle then took up teaching as a more secure career. In 1864 Henle attended teacher college in Esslingen, where he was trained to teach secular and religious education. The supreme Jewish authorities of Württemberg required Jewish teachers to train as cantors to supplement their income, as they were permitted to teach onlyl Jewish children.

After finishing teacher training in 1868, Henle began as a teacher and cantor in Laupheim, where he also gave music lessons at the Jewish elementary school, and contributed to services at the synagogue during Shabbats and holidays. He was the director of the Jewish choral society Frohsinn ("Cheerfulness") and founded a mixed choir for the synagogue and took part in public concerts. After the end of the Franco-Prussian War in 1871 the city council commissioned the 21-year-old Henle to compose a peace hymn which was performed by the city's three male choirs, reflecting the esteem in which his musical talent was already held.

In 1873 Henle went to Ulm to become hazzan at the newly built synagogue there. As there was no Jewish elementary school in Ulm, Henle concentrated on religious service, directing the choir as well as religious and music education. He also resumed his studies at the Stuttgart conservatoire in composition and singing. In 1877 he earned his teaching license and a year later was approved as a cantor.

His talent had come to the attention of rabbi Max Sänger from Hamburg, and in 1879 he was invited to perform at the reform Hamburg Temple with the prospect of getting a permanent tenure there. He was also asked to perform in Königsberg, East-Prussia, but left the position as cantor to his friend Eduard Birnbaum accepted the offer from Hamburg, where he immediately formed a mixed choir. One member of the mixed choir was Caroline Franziska Herschel, who was related to Moses Mendelssohn. They married in 1882, and from that date on Henle's wife accompanied him at his performances and official functions. They had three children, Alwin, Paul William and Albertine.

Henle composed mostly for mixed choirs accompanied by organ, revolutionary at the time, given the traditionally strict separation of men and women in the synagogue. During Henle's thirty-four years as main cantor in Hamburg, he also worked as an author, developed the choirs of the reform synagogue, trained future singers and cantors, and was chairman of the German Association of Cantors for more than fifteen years.

Henle reintroduced biblical cantillation and Ashkenazi pronunciation at the Hamburg synagogue. Until then the cantors of the Hamburg synagogue had used Sephardic recitative and Portuguese pronunciation of Hebrew.

The tension between these traditions and the growing reformist movement within the congregation subsequently increased. Following the ideas of the reform movement, Henle introduced new concepts by employing traditions of his Southern German birthplace in his compositions, which were also influenced by the works of his wife's cousin, Felix Mendelssohn-Bartholdy, who influenced Henle's contemporaries as well. Henle was also influenced by the works of Viennese cantor and composer Salomon Sulzer.

Henle's efforts to reform the musical liturgy in Hamburg were ultimately successful, and his mixed choir became famous for its performances, which also benefited the fortunes of the synagogue.

Henle's compositions were highly regarded and used not only by reform congregations in Germany but also in the United States. They were published in 1900 in Kompositionen von M. Henle, containing thirty hymns, and in 1913 a Haggadah for the Passover celebration at home included compositions by Henle and Jacques Offenbach.

Henle died in Hamburg in 1925. His wife Caroline perished in Theresienstadt concentration camp in 1943.

Moritz Henle Street in Laupheim commemorates him.

== See also ==
- History of religious Jewish music
- History of the Jews in Laupheim
- Laupheim
- Reform Judaism
