= Dávid Leimdörfer =

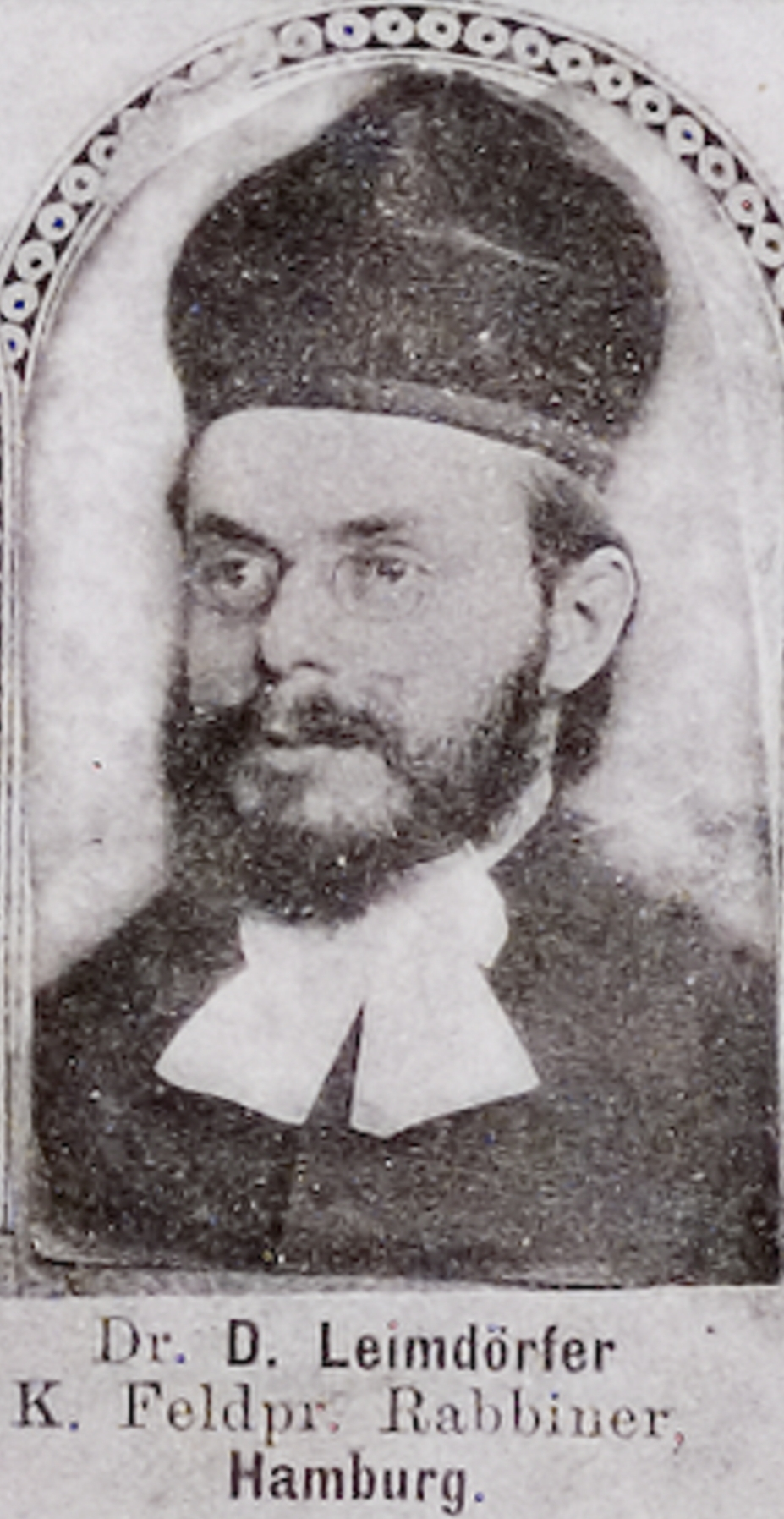
D. Leimdörfer

David Leimdörfer (Hungarian: Leimdörfer Dávid; September 17, 1851 – 4 November 1922) was a rabbi born in Hliník nad Vahom (also Hungarian: Geletnek, Slovak: Hliník (nad Vahom), German: Hlinick), Kingdom of Hungary, 17 September 1851.

He was educated at his native place and at Zsolna (today Žilina), Waitzen (Vác), Budapest, Pressburg (today Bratislava), and Vienna. He became a military chaplain in the Austro-Hungarian army; from 1875 to 1883 he was rabbi at Nordhausen (Thuringia), Prussia, and in 1883 he became rabbi at Hamburg Temple, where he was also principal of the school for religion and of the Jewish high school for girls. He died in 1922.

== Literary works ==
Leimdörfer's works include:

- Kurzgefasste Religionslehre der Israeliten, Nordhausen, 1876
- Die Kürzeste Darstellung der Nachbiblischen Gesch. für die Israelitische Schuljugend, ib. 1880 (4th ed. 1896)
- Die Chanuka Wunder, Magdeburg, 1888; and Die Lebende Megilla, Hamburg, 1888; both festival plays
- Der Hamburger Tempel, ib. 1889
- Das Heilige Schriftwerk Koheleth im Lichte der Gesch, ib. 1892
- Die Messias Apokalypse, Vienna, 1895
- Das Psalter Ego in den Ichpsalmen, Hamburg, 1898
- Zur Kritik des Buches Esther, Frankfurt, 1899
- Die Lösung des Koheleträtsels Durch Ibn Baruch, Berlin, 1900
- Der Altbiblische Priestersegen, Frankfurt, 1900
- Mein erster Lehrer : aus dem Buche meines Gedächtnisses, Vienna, 1909

== See also ==
- Hamburg Temple
