= Meyer Israel Bresselau =

German Reform rabbi (1785–1839)

- Born: 25 April 1785
- Died: 25 December 1839 (aged 54)
- Occupations: Founding member and chairman of the Hamburg Temple, Notary
- Notable work: Co-editor of the temple's prayer book Seder ha Avodah

Meyer Israel Bresselau (25 April 1785 – 25 December 1839) was a founding member and chairman of the Hamburg Temple, one of the first Jewish reform congregations in Germany.

Bresselau earned his living as notary from 1811. He was among the first members of the New Israelite Temple Society, founded 1817. He was co-editor of the temple's prayer book Seder ha Avodah, which contained a German translation and German prayers along with the traditional Hebrew prayers and is considered the first Reform liturgy. It was firmly opposed by Orthodox rabbis for omissions in the prayer text. In defense of his work Bresselau wrote in 1819 Ueber die Gebete der Israeliten in der Landessprache ("About the Jewish Prayers in the National Language"). The same year he wrote a polemic satire in Hebrew cherev noqemet něqam běrît in defense of the position of the temple. An annotated translation of this work was written by Donald B. Rossoff as a rabbinic thesis (Hebrew Union College - Jewish Institute of Religion, 1981).

== Literature ==
- Encyclopaedia Judaica, Bd. 4, Jerusalem, 1971. S. 233
- Andreas Brämer: Judentum und religiöse Reform. Der Hamburger Israelitische Tempel 1817–1938. Dölling und Galitz Verlag, Hamburg 2000 ISBN 3-933374-78-2
- Michael A. Meyer: Antwort auf die Moderne, Wien 1988.
