= Bernays =

Bernays is a surname. Notable people with the surname include:

- Adolphus Bernays (1795–1864), professor of German in London; brother of Isaac Bernays and father of:
  - Lewis Adolphus Bernays (1831–1908), public servant and agricultural writer in Australia; son of Adolphus Bernays
- Edward Bernays (1891–1995), the "father of public relations"; great-grandson of Isaac Bernays and father of:
  - Anne Bernays (born 1930), American novelist; daughter of Edward Bernays and American novelist Doris E. Fleischman
- Isaac Bernays (1792–1849), German rabbi; brother of Adolphus Bernays and father of:
  - Jakob Bernays (1824–1881), German classical linguist
  - Michael Bernays (1834–1897), German literature historian
- Karl Ludwig Bernays (1815–1876), Marxist journalist
- Marie Bernays (1883–1939), German politician and educator
- Martha Bernays (1861–1951), wife of Sigmund Freud; granddaughter of Isaac Bernays by his son Berman
- Paul Bernays (1888–1977), Swiss mathematician born in London; great-grandson of Isaac Bernays
- Robert Bernays (1902–1945), Liberal MP; great-grandson of Adolphus Bernays
- Thekla M. Bernays (1856–1931), women's suffrage's activist, author and lecturer

== See also ==
- Bernays family
- Bernay (disambiguation)
