= Bernays family =

Jewish family from Germany

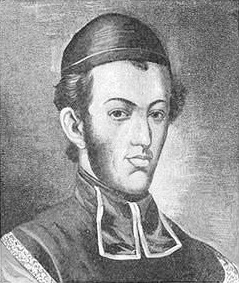
Isaac Bernays

The Jewish Bernays family has its recent origins in the town of Groß-Gerau in the German state of Hesse, where the patriarch of the family, Rabbiner Beer Neustädtel (also known as Baer Lazarus) lived with his family. Two of his sons, Isaac, born in 1742 and Jacob, born in 1747 went on to establish very influential and well known dynasties in Europe, England, USA and Australia. During the French occupation of the Mainz region in the 1800s, all families were required under the Code of Napoleon to register an identifiable family name and in doing so, to gain considerable freedoms including ability to attend university. At that time the family registered the name "Bernays" in lieu of Beer or Baer.

Children of two sons of Isaac Bernays (1742–1821), namely Lucian Henry Bernays (1771–1825) and Klemenz Bernays (1773–1837), went on to distinguished careers in medicine, writing and public service. Similarly, a number of the children of Jacob Bernays (1747–1817) produced high achievers in the fields of medicine, engineering and public administration.

Isaac BERNAYS (1742–1821).

Son, Lucian Henry Bernays (known as Leser Beer until 1808) was born in Weisenau in 1771. He married Helene Moise (later Blum) in 1802. Their children are:

1. Amalia BERNAYS, born 1798 in Weisenau (known as Gudel Leser until 1808); married Judas HAMBURG in 1821; died 1830 in Mainz, Hessen;

2. Bernard BERNAYS, born 1801 in Weisnau (known as Leser Beer until 1808); married Annie SHERMAN;

3. Henri BERNAYS, born 1803 in Weisenau (known as Hayum Leser until 1808); married Amalie WITH; died 1890 in Mainz Hessen;

4. Pius BERNAYS, born 1805 in Mainz, Hessen (known as Baruch Leser until 1808); died 1843 in Mainz;

5. Charlotte BERNAYS, born 1807 in Mainz, Hessen; Known as Charlotte Leser until 1808); died 1880 in Frankfurt am Main, Hesse-Nassau;

6. Charles BERNAYS, born 1808 in Mainz, Hessen;

7. Victor BERNAYS, born 1809 in Mainz, Hessen; married Henriette HAMBURG in 1843; died 1883 in Bruessel;

8. Alexander BERNAYS

Lucian Henry BERNAYS died in Mainz in 1825.

Son, Klemenz BERNAYS (known as Gumbrich Isaac Beer until 1808) was born in Weisenau in 1773; married Theresia CREIZENACH in 1816; died 1837; their children are:

1. Bernhard Clemenz BERNAYS, born 1812 in Mainz; married Annie Sherman ca. 1852; died 1901, Napa Valley, California, US;

2. Karl Ludwig BERNAYS, born 1815 in Mainz; married Josephine WOLF ca 1843 in Frankreich; died 1879 in St Louis, US;

3. Jakob BERNAYS, born 1818 in Mainz; possibly died in the US;

4. August BERNAYS, born 1820 in Oggersheim; died ca. 1863 in Alabama, US;

5. Isaac BERNAYS, born 1823 in Oggersheim; died 1888 in US;

6. George John BERNAYS, born (Georg) 1824 in Büren/Minden; married Wilhelmina Christina Theresia DOERING in 1853; died 1888 in St Louis, US;

7. Amalia BERNAYS, married FORTHUBER;

8. Helena BERNAYS, born 1827 in Oggersheim; died 1913 in Frankfurt.

Jacob BERNAYS (1747–1817)

Son, Isaac BERNAYS (Chacham, known as Isaac Jacob until 1808) was born 1792 in Weisenau. He married Sara Lea BERENDS in 1822. Their children are:

1. Fanny BERNAYS, born 1823 in Hamburg; married Ludwig Michael HEINE; died 1888 in Hamburg;

2. Jakob BERNAYS, born 11 Sep 1824 in Hamburg; he was a noted philologist and classical and Hebrew scholar, first from 1849 to 1854 at the University of Breslau, secondly, in 1854 he co-founded the Jewish Theological Seminary in Breslau, and thirdly in 1868, he was appointed assistant professor and librarian at the University of Bonn; single; died 26 May 1881 in Bonn;

3. Berman BERNAYS, born 1826 in Hamburg, Prussia; married Emmeline Egla PHILIPP in June 1854; businessman in Vienna; died 1879; their children are:

3.1 Eli BERNAYS; 3.2 Martha BERNAYS, born 26 July 1861 in Hamburg, Prussia, married Sigismund Schlomo FREUD on 14 September 1886; 3.3 Minna BERNAYS;

4. Lea BERNAYS, born 1829 in Hamburg; married Isaac Low BEER; died 1924 in Brno;

5. Michael BERNAYS, born 27 November 1834; married Louise RUEBKE; adopted the Christian tradition and was able to gain appointments as a literary historian at the universities of Bonn, Leipzig and Munich; died 25 February 1897; their children are:

5.1 Hermann UHDE-BERNAYS, born 1875 in Weimar; died 1965; 5.2 Otto Paul Ulrich BERNAYS, born 1881 in Munich; died 1948 in Karlsruhe; 5.3 Marie BERNAYS, born 1883; single; died 1939;

6. Levin Louis BERNAYS

7. Johanna BERNAYS

Son, Prof. Adolphus BERNAYS PhD (known as Aaron Jacob until 1808), born 1794 in Mainz; married Martha Arrowsmith in London; died 1864 in Stanmore; their children are:

1. Adolphus Aaron BERNAYS

2. Leopold John BERNAYS (christened Johan Leopold BERNAYS)

3. Edwin Arthur BERNAYS

4. Albert James BERNAYS

5. Frederica BERNAYS

6. Ellen BERNAYS

7. Cecil Georgiana BERNAYS

8. Octavius BERNAYS

9. Lewis Adolphus BERNAYS

== Partial lineage ==
Isaac BERNAYS (1742–1821)

  - Klemenz Bernays (1773-1837), son of Isaac Beer later (after 1808) Isaac Bernays.
    - George J. Bernays (1824–1888)
      - Thekla M. Bernays (1856–1931), American suffragette, author, and lecturer
      - Lily Bernays
        - Eric Simons Bernays (1884–1935), son of Lily, adopted by Thekla M. Bernays
      - Augustus Charles Bernays (1854–1907), St. Louis surgeon
    - Jacob Francis Bernays (1818–1894), Civil War veteran and surgeon, son of Clemens Bernays
    - Karl Ludwig Bernays, aka Charles Louis Bernays (1815–1876), Marxist journalist
      - Theresa Bernays
        - Louis C. Spiering (1874–1912), architect and architecture professor based in St. Louis who worked on building designs for the St. Louis World's Fair of 1904

Jacob BERNAYS (1747–1817)

  - Isaac Bernays (1792–1849), German rabbi, son of Jacob Gera Bernays.
    - Berman Bernays (1826–1879)
      - Eli Bernays
        - Edward Bernays (1891–1995), the "father of public relations", son of Eli Bernays and Anna Freud, nephew of Sigmund Freud, husband of Doris Fleischman
          - Anne Bernays (born 1930), American novelist
      - Martha Bernays (1861–1951), wife of Sigmund Freud, daughter of Berman Bernays.
    - Jakob Bernays (1824–1881), German classical linguist, son of Isaac Bernays.
    - Michael Bernays (1834–1897), German literature historian, son of Isaac Bernays.
    - Louis Bernays, son of Isaac Bernays
      - Jules Bernays, son of Louis Bernays
        - Paul Bernays (1888–1977), Swiss mathematician, born in London; great-grandson of Isaac Bernays.
  - Adolphus Bernays (1795–1864), first professor of German in the King's College in London, son of Jacob Gera Bernays.
    - Albert James Bernays (1823–1892), English chemist, son of Adolphus Bernays.
    - Lewis Adolphus Bernays (1831–1908), public servant and agricultural writer in Australia, son of Adolphus Bernays.
      - Charles Arrowsmith Bernays (1862–1940), author of Queensland Politics During Sixty Years, and Queensland—Our Seventh Political Decade, son of Lewis Adolphus Bernays.
        - Roy Marr Bernays (1890–1915), Australian Infantry, A.I.F. 3rd Battalion, son of Charles Arrowsmith Bernays, died at Gallipoli, Turkey.
    - Edwin Arthur Bernays, son of Adolphus Bernays
      - Herbert Leopold Bernays, son of Edwin Arthur Bernays
        - Charles Murchison Bernays (1880–1920), Royal Army Medical Corps, physician and surgeon, son of Herbert Leopold Bernays.
    - Leopold John Bernays, son of Adolphus Bernays
      - Arthur Edwin Bernays, son of Leopold John Bernays
        - Leopold Arthur Bernays (1885–1917), Commander Royal Navy, Companion of the Most Distinguished Order of Saint Michael and Saint George, Distinguished Service Order, son of Rev. Arthur Edwin Bernays.
          - Max Bernays (1910–1974), Royal Canadian Naval Reserve Acting Chief Petty Officer, son of Leopold Arthur Bernays
      - Stewart Frederic Lewis Bernays, son of Leopold John Bernays
        - John Stewart Noall Bernays (1893–1941), Lieutenant Colonel Leicestershire Regiment 2nd Battalion, Military Cross, son of Rev. Stewart Frederic Lewis Bernays, great-grandson of Adolphus Bernays, died at El Alamein.
        - Robert Bernays (1902–1945), Liberal MP, son of Rev. Stewart Frederick Lewis Bernays, great-grandson of Adolphus Bernays, died in an aircraft crash in the Adriatic Sea while flying from Italy to Greece as part of a parliamentary delegation to visit British troops.
