= Ferdinand Hitzig =

German biblical critic (1807–1875)

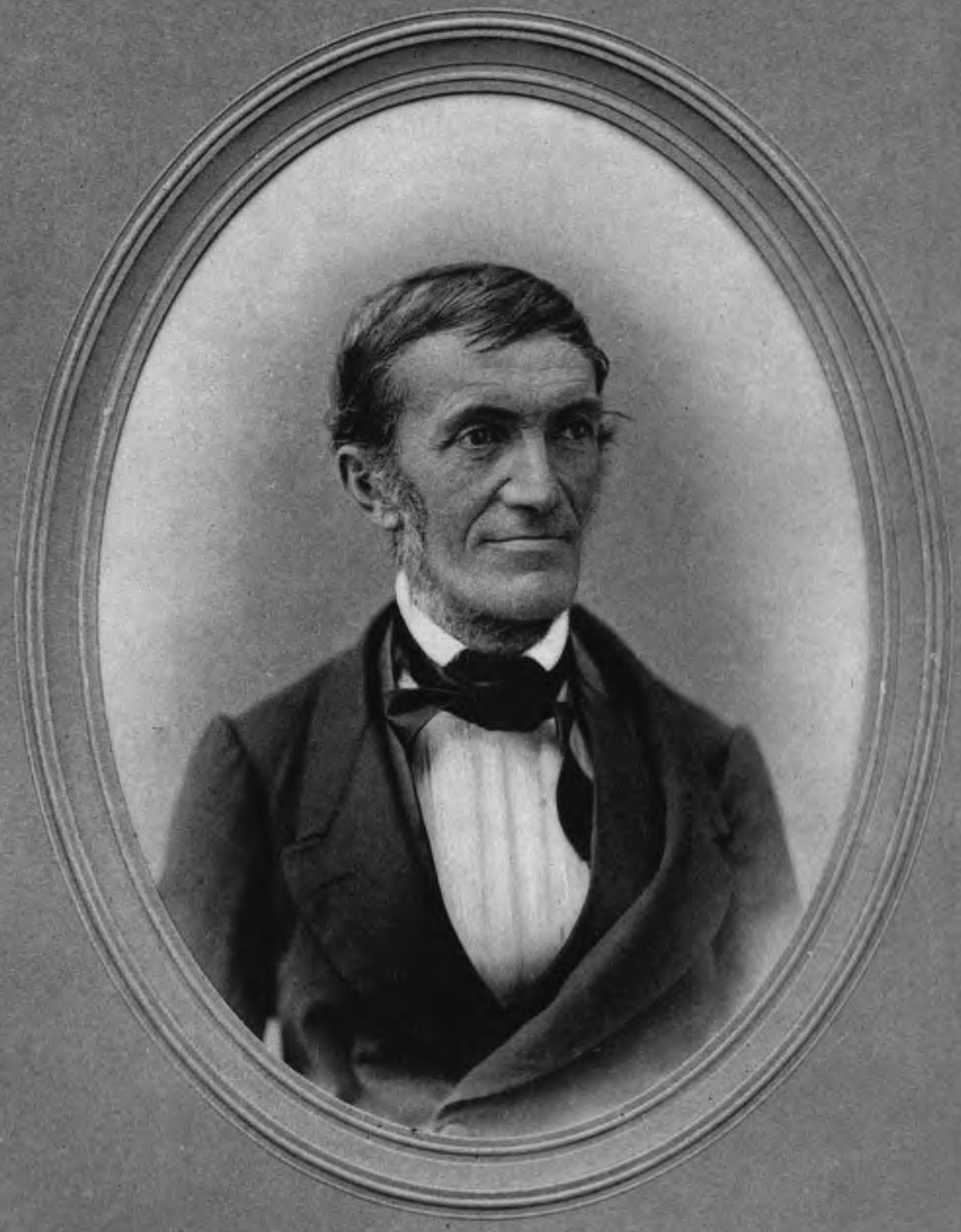
Ferdinand Hitzig

Ferdinand Hitzig (23 June 1807 – 22 January 1875) was a German biblical critic.

== Life and works ==
Hitzig was born at Hauingen (now a part of Lörrach), Baden, where his father was a pastor. He studied theology at Heidelberg under Heinrich Paulus, at Halle under Wilhelm Gesenius and at Göttingen under Ewald. Returning to Heidelberg he became Privatdozent in theology in 1829, and in 1831 published his Begriff der Kritik am Alten Testamente praktisch erörtert, a study of Old Testament criticism in which he explained the critical principles of the grammatico-historical school, and his Des Propheten Jonas Orakel über Moab, an exposition of the 5th and 16th chapters of the Book of Isaiah attributed by him to the prophet Jonah mentioned in 2 Kings xiv. 25.

In 1833 he was called to the University of Zürich as professor ordinarius of theology. His next work was a commentary on Isaiah with a translation (Übersetzung und Auslegung des Propheten Jesaias), which he dedicated to Heinrich Ewald, and which Hermann Hupfeld (1796–1866), well known as a commentator on the Psalms (1855–1861), pronounced to be his best exegetical work. At Zürich he laboured for a period of twenty-eight years, during which, besides commentaries on The Psalms (1835–1836; 2nd ed., 1863–1865), The Minor Prophets (1838; 3rd ed., 1863), Jeremiah (1841; 2nd ed., 1866), Ezekiel (1847), Daniel (1850), Ecclesiastes (1847), Canticles (1855), and Proverbs (1858), he published a monograph, Über Johannes Markus und seine Schriften (1843), in which he maintained the chronological priority of the second gospel. He wrote works of archaeological interest, of which the most important are Die Erfindung des Alphabets (1840), Urgeschichte und Mythologie der Philister (1845), and Die Grabschrift des Eschmunezar (1855).

After the death in 1860 of Friedrich Umbreit, one of the founders of the well-known Studien und Kritiken, Hitzig was called to succeed him as professor of theology at Heidelberg. Here he wrote his Geschichte des Volkes Israel (1869–1870), in two parts, extending respectively to the end of the Persian domination and to the fall of Masada, 72 AD, as well as a work on the Pauline epistles, Zur Kritik Paulinischer Briefe (1870), on the Moabite Stone, Die Inschrift des Mescha (1870), and on Assyrian, Sprache und Sprachen Assyriens (1871), besides revising the commentary on Job by Ludwig Hirzel, first published in 1839.

He was also a contributor to the Monatsschrift des wissenschaftlichen Vereins in Zürich, the Zeitschrift der deutschen morgenländischen Gesellschaft, the Theologische Studien und Kritiken, Eduard Zeller's Theologische Jahrbücher, and Adolf Hilgenfeld's Zeitschrift für wissenschaftliche Theologie.

Hitzig died in Heidelberg.

His lectures on biblical theology (Vorlesungen über biblische Theologie und messianische Weissagungen) were published in 1880 after his death, along with a portrait and biographical sketch by his pupil, J. J. Kneucker (b. 1840), professor of theology at Heidelberg.

== Belshazzar and his historicity ==
Hitzig is as an example of those who denied the historicity of Belshazzar, as shown by what he wrote in his commentary on the Book of Daniel:

Selbst den Fall gesetzt, dass der fragliche Koenig Mediens existiert habe, wurde der Name, unter welchen er bei Dan. auftritt, zu beanstanden sein. Jene Zweiheit in Nabonned = Baltasar wiederholt sich in Cyaxares = Darius, und wieder zu Daniels Nachteil.

Translation:

Even supposing that the king of the Medes in question [i.e., Darius; Dan 5:31] had existed, the objection is the name under which he is referenced in Daniel. Each of the two were standardized in Nabonidus = Belshazzar which is repeated in Cyaxares = Darius, to Daniel’s discredit.

Hitzig thought that, historically, there was no such person as Belshazzar, or alternately, that the deluded author of the book of Daniel made two mistakes: he gave Nabonidus the name Belshazzar and Cyraxares the name Darius. Hitzig's position logically followed from his presupposition that the book of Daniel was a fraud perpetrated by a nameless author in Maccabean times. Such a deceiver could not have known a genuine name of Belshazzar from the sixth century BC, because at the time Hitzig wrote, all resources available to him outside of the Bible and texts derived from the Bible named Nabonidus as the last king of Babylon, without any mention of Belshazzar. This conclusion was therefore a natural consequence of the starting assumptions, which were the presuppositions accepted by the radical criticism of the day. As the Jewish Encyclopedia explains:

The name "Belshazzar" was previously held to have been invented by the author of the Book of Daniel, which has long been recognized as a Maccabean production (see DANIEL). Since the discovery and decipherment of the cuneiform inscriptions, however, "Belshazzar" is now generally admitted to be the Hebrew-Aramaic equivalent of the Babylonian form ‘Belsharuṣur’ (Bel preserve the king), which has been found in the cuneiform documents as the name of the eldest son of Nabonidus (Nabuna'id), the last native king of Babylon (555-538 B.C.).

== Publications ==
- Begriff der Kritik, am Alten Testament praktisch erörtert, 1831
- Die 12 kleinen Propheten, ("The 12 Minor Prophets"), 1838
- Über die Erfindung des Alphabetes, ("About the Invention of the Alphabet"), 1840
- Urgeschichte u. Mythologie der Philistäer, ("Prehistory and Mythology of the Philistines"), 1845
- Das buch Daniel, 1850
- Die proph. Bücher des Alten Testaments, 1854
- Geschichte des Volkes Israel, ("History of the People of Israel"), 1869/70
