= Ludwig Hirzel =

Ludwig Hirzel may refer to:

- Ludwig Hirzel (theologian) (1801–1841), Swiss theologian
- Ludwig Hirzel (historian) (1838–1897), Swiss literary historian
