= Bernay =

Bernay may refer to:

== People ==
- Alexandre de Bernay, 12th-century Norman poet
- Beryl Bernay (1926–2020), American children's television presenter
- Eric Bernay (1906–1968), American record producer, founder of Keynote Records

== Places in France ==
=== Communes ===
- Bernay, Eure
- Bernay-en-Champagne, Sarthe
- Bernay-en-Ponthieu, Somme
- Bernay-Saint-Martin, Charente-Maritime
- Bernay-Vilbert, Seine-et-Marne

=== Other places ===
- Arrondissement of Bernay, Eure
- Canton of Bernay, Eure

== Transport ==
- Bernay station, serving Bernay, Eure, France

== See also ==
- Bernays
