= Thekla M. Bernays =

American journalist

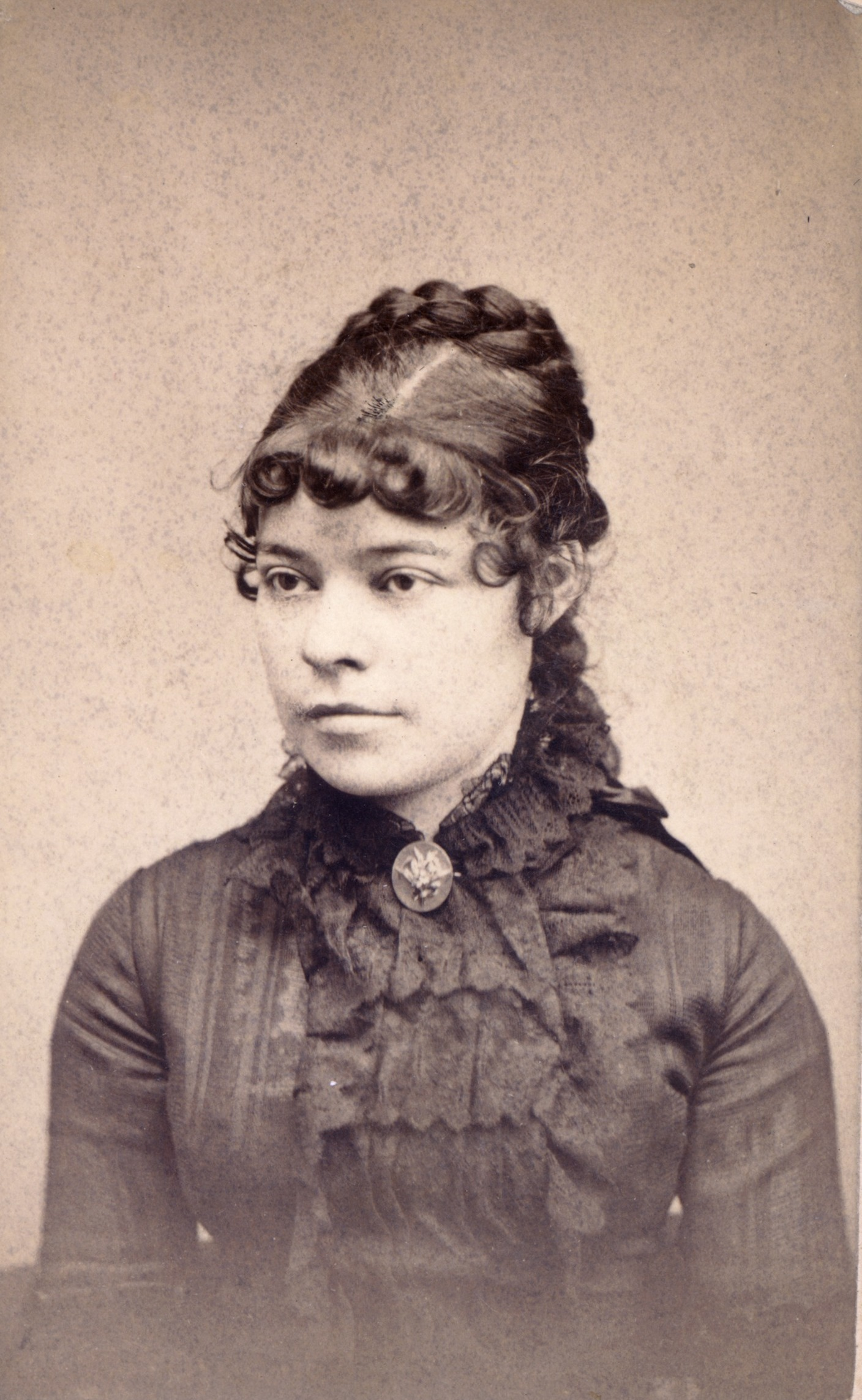
- Born: 1856; Highland, Illinois
- Died: January 30, 1931 (aged 74–75); New York
- Education: McKendree College
- Occupations: Writer, Suffragist

Thekla M. Bernays (1856 – January 30, 1931) was an American author, journalist, artist, art collector, speaker, and suffragette.

== Early life and family ==
Bernays was born in Highland, Illinois, in 1856, the second child of Dr. George J. Bernays (d. 1888) and Minna Bertrand. She was the granddaughter of Clemens Bernays, and great-granddaughter of Jacob Gera Bernays. The Bernays family has many cultural ties in history. Thekla's mother was the daughter of Frederick Doering, of Germany, and granddaughter of Seris Bertrand, of France. Her parents met in Germany but married in St. Louis at the residence of Henry Boernstein, well known theatrical manager and head of a newspaper at that time. Her brother was Dr. Augustus Charles Bernays (1854–1907), a St. Louis surgeon. Bernays would later publish her brother's memoir in 1912.

When Bernays was young, the family moved back to Germany for a time before moving back to the United States, landing in St. Louis. They would eventually settle in Lebanon, Illinois, in 1866.

Bernays and her brother both attended McKendree College, located in Lebanon. Bernays was twice elected at president of one of the college's literary societies, the Clionian, and ranked high as an essayist.

Soon after Bernay's brother's graduation from McKendree College in 1872, the family returned to Germany. For the next five years, they made their home in Heidelberg. Bernays' studies continued in a school for the higher education of women, since women were not admitted to university. In May 1874, a state examination for teachers was held at Karlsruhe, the capital of Grand Duchy of Baden. Bernays, then scarcely eighteen years old, received the highest grade given at the examination.

The family returned to America in the spring of 1877. In November 1888, Bernays' father died of blood poisoning, which was contracted during an operation.

In 1902, Bernays was awarded an honorary degree of Master of Arts from McKendree College for "meritorious work in the criticism of art and modern literature". At the time, she was the third woman at the college to receive that honor.

== Career ==
Bernays was a foreign correspondent for the St. Louis Globe-Democrat and contributed to Reedy's Mirror, the Westliche Post, The Criterion, and other publications.

As a speaker and lecturer, Bernays delivered addresses and read papers before many societies and clubs, including the Young Men's Self-Culture Club, a similar organization for working girls, the St. Louis Negro Self-Culture Association, the Wednesday Club, the Greek Ethics Society, and the Century Club. One of the papers read was printed as a Christmas souvenir, Diplomatic Women; an Essay Read Before the Century Club of St. Louis, Mo., by Miss Thekla M. Bernays. An address delivered before the St. Louis Wednesday Club on "Postulating an American Literature," and which was printed in the "Bulletin" of Washington University, attracted much attention.

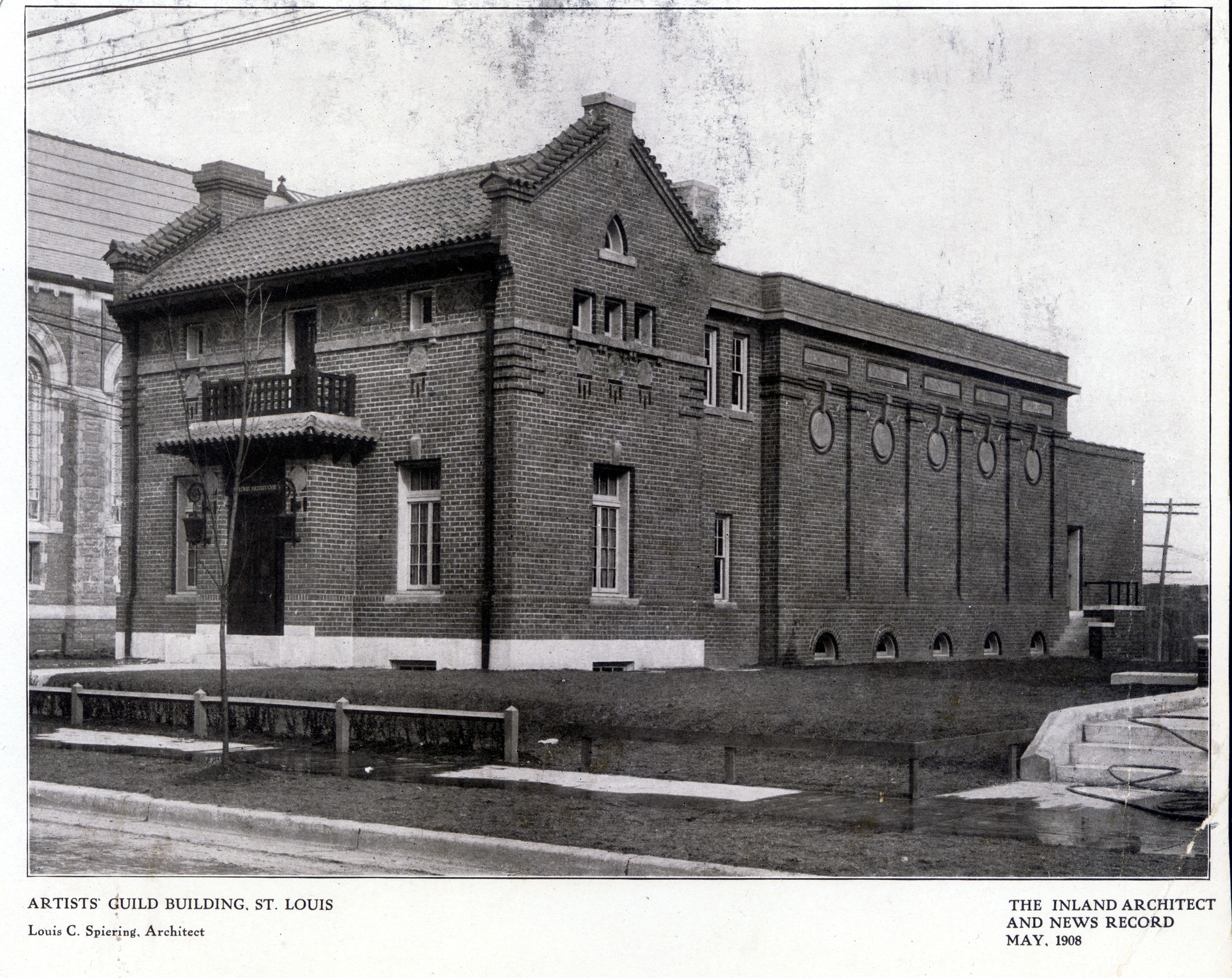
St. Louis Artist's Guild building

Bernays was a charter member of the St. Louis Artists Guild. The building at 812 Union Boulevard was designed by her nephew Louis C. Spiering, perhaps due to her recommendation. She was also a member of the Arts & Crafts jury for the St. Louis World's Fair or Louisiana Purchase Exposition.

In December 1911, Bernays wrote a decalogue for women:

1. equal facilities in education
2. equal rights in the guardianship of children
3. equal wages for equal work
4. a single standard of morality
5. regulation and restraint of child labor
6. abolition of sweatshops
7. abolition of firetrap factories
8. suppression of smoke
9. minimizing the drink evil without interfering with personal liberty
10. abolition of white slave traffic.

== Other activities ==
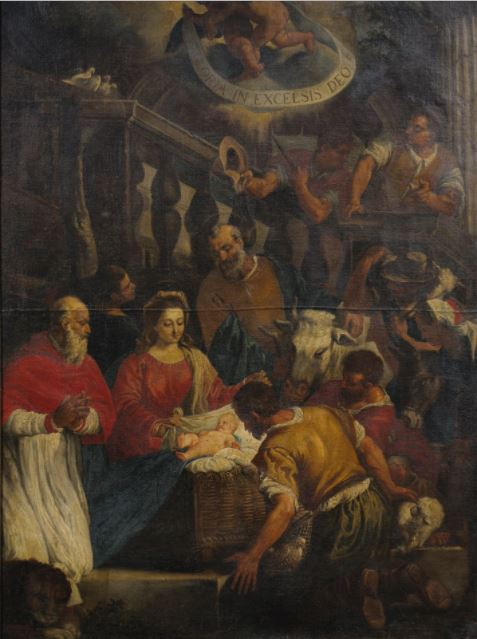
The Adoration of the Shepherds, Follower of Leandro Bassano; Bernays gave this to the Brooklyn Museum.

Bernays was a member of an artists group active from 1890 to 1910, which included Zoe Akins, Sara Teasdale, Orrick Glenday Johns, and William Marion Reedy. Reedy said of Bernays that she had the greatest woman's mind he had ever known. He found her both wise and innocent, discerning and gentle. It was Reedy who introduced Bernays to Akins, and the two women became lifelong friends.

Bernays corresponded with notable American literary figures including Gertrude Atherton, Albert Bloch, Daniel Frohman, Frank Harris, Mitchell Kennerley, and George O'Neil.

Bernays was an art collector. She owned Leandro Bassano's version of The Adoration of the Shepherds, which she would eventually gift to the Brooklyn Museum; the museum sold it in 2013 through Sotheby's, attributing it to a "follower of" Bassano.

== Personal life ==
In 1897, Thekla adopted her nephew, Eric Simons Bernays (1884–1935), son of her sister Lily Bernays and Frederick Simons. In 1885, Eric Simons was the subject of a custody battle between his father, Simons, his mother Lily, and Lily and Thekla's father, George Bernays. In the late 1890s, Thekla moved with Eric to Switzerland where he attended the Ecole de Commerce at Neufchâtel. They returned to St. Louis around 1902 and lived in the Bernays "compound". Eric was struck by an automobile while crossing a street and died of his injuries in 1935.

Bernays died January 30, 1931, in New York, and was buried in Bellefontaine Cemetery in St. Louis.

== Legacy ==
The Thekla M. Bernays Papers, 1870–1931, are housed at the Missouri History Museum archives. The Thekla M. Bernays Scholarship is awarded by the Art Students League of New York.

== Bibliography ==
- Augustus Charles Bernays: A Memoir. St. Louis: C. V. Mosby Company. 1912.
