= Der Bibel'sche Orient =

German-language magazine

- Editor: Isaac Bernays
- First issue: April 24, 1821; 205 years ago
- Final issue: August 12, 1821; 204 years ago
- Language: German

Der Bibel'sche Orient was a Jewish German-language magazine of which only two numbers appeared (Munich, 1821), these being reportedly edited by Isaac Bernays.

Its object, as stated in the first announcement, April 24 (the second bears date of August 12, 1812 [1821]), was "to exhibit the spirit of the sacred books in all their purity and clearness, but without any learned verbosity, and to determine the rank of these fiery utterances from olden times as well-defined expressions of the human soul, aside from their strongly marked peculiarities and their value as important historical documents."

Der Bibel'sche Orient, whose style was dark, mystical, and confused to a degree, carried mythology into the Scriptures: it betrayed the influence of Schelling's quaint philosophy. While regarding the Bible and the development of the Jews from a world-historical point of view, its editor came to the conclusion that all religions can manifest themselves only by exerting reformatory influences. Though looking with contempt upon Mendelssohn and his disciples, the author was even more in favor of the Reform movement than were the latter.

Der Bibel'sche Orient attracted considerable attention upon its first appearance, but was soon forgotten.
