= Albert James Bernays =

- Born: 8 November 1823; St Pancras, London
- Died: 5 January 1892 (aged 68); Brixton, London
- Education: King's College School
- Occupation: Chemist
- Spouse: Ellen Labatt (d. 1901)
- Father: Dr. Adolphus Bernays

Albert James Bernays (8 November 1823 – 5 January 1892) was a British chemist. He was the son of Dr. Adolphus Bernays (d. 22 December 1864), modern languages Professor at King's College, London.

== Life ==
Bernays was educated at King's College School, and studied chemistry with C. Remigius Fresenius, and afterwards, with Justus Liebig at Giessen, where he graduated PhD. His doctoral thesis was probably a paper on limonin, a bitter principle which he discovered in the pips of oranges and lemons (published in Buchner's Repertorium für die Pharmacie and abstracted in Liebig's Annalen, 1841, xl. 317). In 1845, he began his career as an analyst and lecturer on chemistry in Derby, and became known for his interest in questions concerning food and hygiene. In 1851, he served as a juror at the Great Exhibition. In 1852, he published the first edition of Household Chemistry, a popular work, of which the fourth edition, published in 1862, was called The Science of Home Life, and the seventh edition, published in 1869, The Student's Chemistry. In 1855 Bernays was appointed to the lectureship in chemistry at St Mary's Hospital, London; he resigned in 1860, and accepted a similar post at St. Thomas's Hospital, which he retained till his death. Bernays was also public analyst to St. Giles's, Camberwell, and St. Saviours, Southwark, was for many years chemist and analyst to the Kent Water Company, and sometime examiner to the Royal College of Physicians. He died from bronchitis at Acre House, Brixton, on 5 January 1892, and was by his own desire cremated at Woking.

Bernays was a genial man and a capable and popular teacher; he took a great interest in social matters generally, and gave over a thousand free public lectures during his lifetime. Besides the works mentioned above he published a small manual on food in 1876, an essay on The Moderate Use of Alcohol True Temperance, published in the Contemporary Review and reprinted with essays by others in The Alcohol Question, various editions of Notes for Students in Chemistry, and miscellaneous lectures on agricultural chemistry and other subjects. He also carried out investigations on the atmosphere of Cornish mines and on dangerous trades, and made inventions in water filtration. He was a fellow of the Chemical Society and of the Institute of Chemistry.

== Family ==
He married Ellen Labatt, daughter of Benjamin Evans; she died on 6 February 1901 (Times, 8 February 1901). (Note: [Obituaries in the Times, 9 January 1892; Journ. Chem. Society 1892, page 488, by T[homas] S[tevenson]; Chemical News, lxv. 85; Nature, xlv. 258; British Med. Journ. 1892, i. 148; The Analyst, 1892, xvii. 60, and index to vols. i-xx.; British Museum Catalogue; King's Coll. Cal.; Bernays's own works.]) One of his brothers was Lewis Adolphus Bernays, notable public servant in Queensland, Australia.
