= Allegory of the Element Earth =

Painting by Leandro Bassano

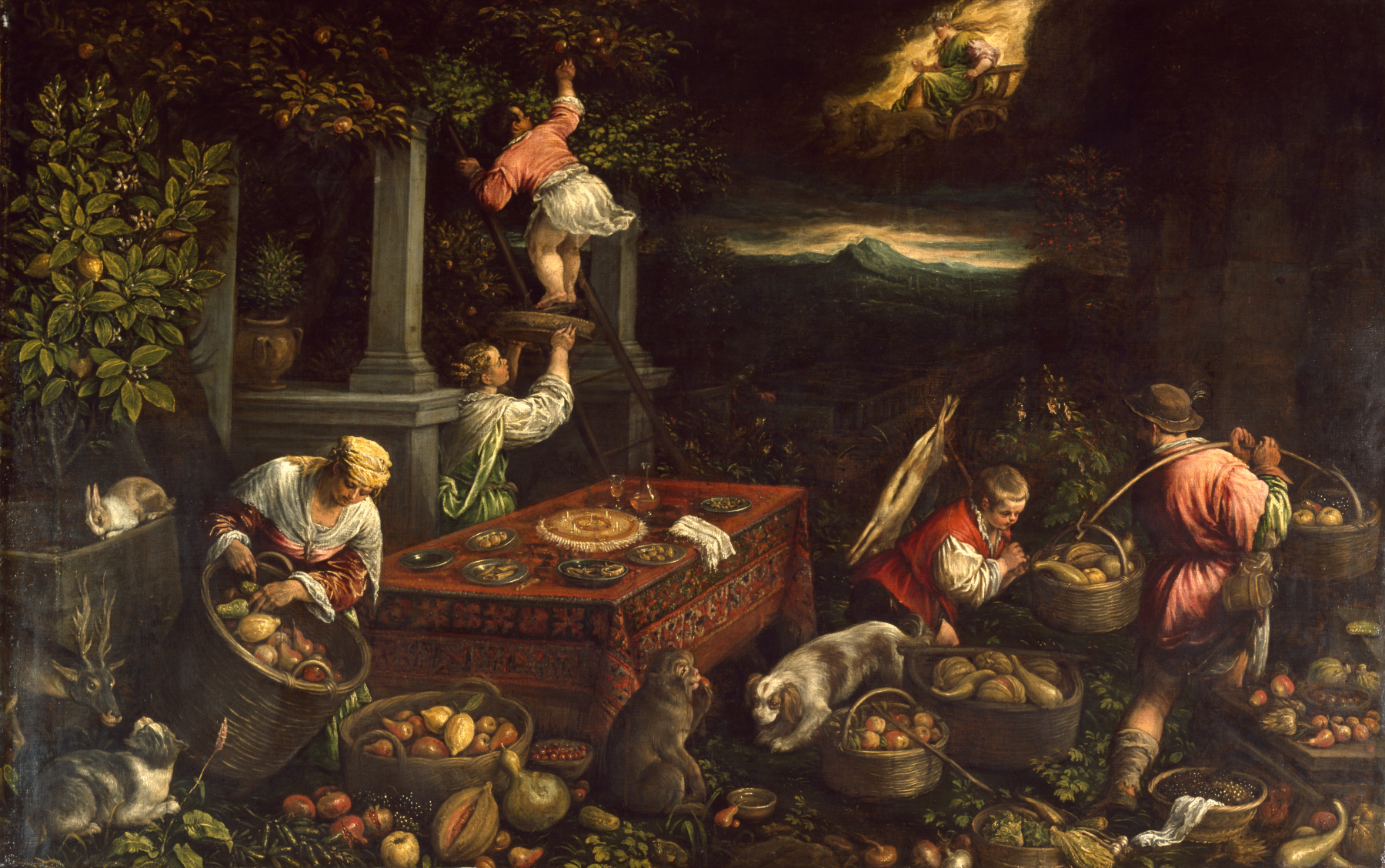
- Artist: Leandro Bassano
- Year: c. 1580
- Medium: Oil on Canvas
- Dimensions: 148 cm × 234.2 cm (58 in × 92.2 in)
- Location: The Walters Art Museum; Baltimore

Allegory to the Element Earth is a painting by the Venetian Renaissance artist Leandro Bassano of about 1580, now in The Walters Art Museum, Baltimore.

== History ==
In the 16th century the world was thought to consist of four elements, each associated with the four seasons. Air was attributed to spring, fire to summer, earth to autumn, and water to winter. In 1648 a written work by Carlo Ridolfi records that Leandro Bassano's father, Jacopo, painted a series of allegories of the four elements for a prince. The series was likely installed in a single room of a palace or villa. The replica, presented here, is believed to have been painted by Leandro Bassano at his father's studio. The elder Bassano and his sons were the first in Italian art to fill their works with common subjects and natural details.

== Composition ==
In this work representing the element earth, several workers gather and carry fruits, vegetables, and game. The ancient Roman goddess of fertility, Cybele, drives across the sky in a wagon pulled by lions. The structure on the left alludes to a setting of a nobleman's villa. The table is draped with an oriental carpet and covered with sweets, fruits, and wine. The presence of these objects indicates that the land being worked by the servants does not belong to them. Several animals are also represented throughout the painting and are shown in coexistence despite their variety.

== Analysis ==
The classical ideals, mythology, and architectural elements represented in the painting suggest that it was created for an audience familiar with the humanistic focus on the ancient world. The coexistence of a variety of animals represented in the painting hints at an Eden-like state. The dark scenery provided the artist the opportunity to create dramatic light and shade with rich oil paints. The colors standout dramatically against the dark shadows, a technique known as chiaroscuro.

== Off the Wall ==
Allegory of the Element Earth was featured in Off the Wall, an open-air exhibition on the streets of Baltimore, Maryland, in 2012. A reproduction of the painting was on display at the Whole Foods Market on Smith Avenue. The National Gallery, London began the concept of bringing art out of doors in 2007 and the Detroit Institute of Art introduced the concept in the U.S.. The Off the Wall reproductions of the Walters' paintings are done on weather-resistant vinyl and include a description of the painting and a QR code for smart phones.
