= James Laurence Watts =

Australian sculptor (1849–1925)

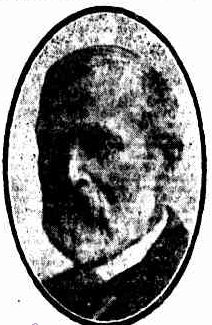
James Laurence Watts, sculptor

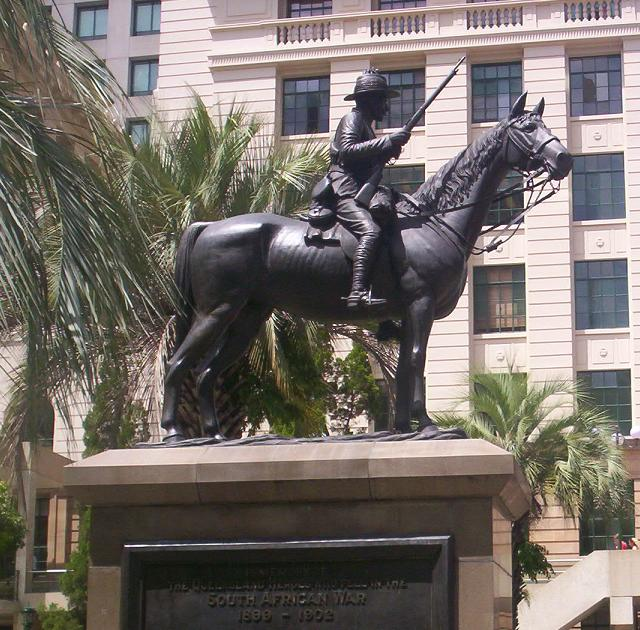
The Scout, South African War Memorial, Brisbane

James Laurence Watts (1849–1925) was a sculptor in Queensland, Australia. He was one of the pioneer sculptors in Australia and his works appear in many Queensland public buildings and places.

== Early life ==
James Laurence Watts was born in the town of Bedminster, Somerset, England to John and Betsey (née Dowdney) Watts. Bedminster being today a district of Bristol. James is the third eldest in a family of 4 sons. The family moved to Weston-super-Mare on the Somerset coast about 1855. Here John found work as a fisherman.

It is not known what inspired James to be a sculptor but his elder brother is a mason and this may have been the inspiration. It is believed that James received his early art training at the South Kensington School of Arts, London during the period of 1870s. He then married Mary Louisa Lloyd on 15 January 1880 at Pembroke, St Mary, Pembrokeshire, Wales.

On the 31st November 1884 he and his wife and family of one daughter and two sons arrive in Brisbane, Queensland, Australia aboard the ship ‘Roma’. James Watts’ family were listed as ‘Bounty’ passengers, as was the majority of passengers on ship. The meaning of ‘Bounty ‘ is a form of assisted passage by the Queensland Government at that time to provide industry in Queensland with skilled labourers and tradesmen.

== Career ==
James accepts work on arrival with James Campbell and Sons, a large sawmilling and building materials merchant of Brisbane. James Campbell and Sons had purchased in 1883, Petrie's Quarry and Brickworks along with Fischer’ Pottery at Albion as part of the company's expansion. There was a market at the time for good quality pottery and James was employed as a clay modeller at the pottery. James continued to be employed at the pottery for most of his working life.

His first known sculpture is in 1888 in the form of a bust of Sir Anthony Musgrave, an early Governor of Queensland who died in office. This sculpture was displayed at the head office of James Campbell and Sons.

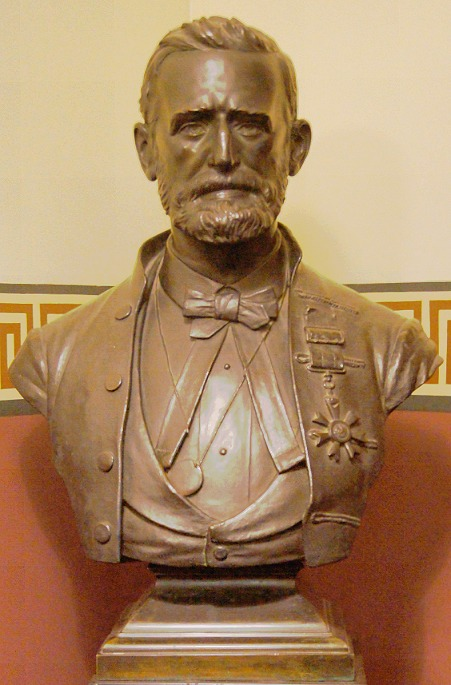
Bronze Bust of Mr. L. A. Bernays held at Queensland Parliament

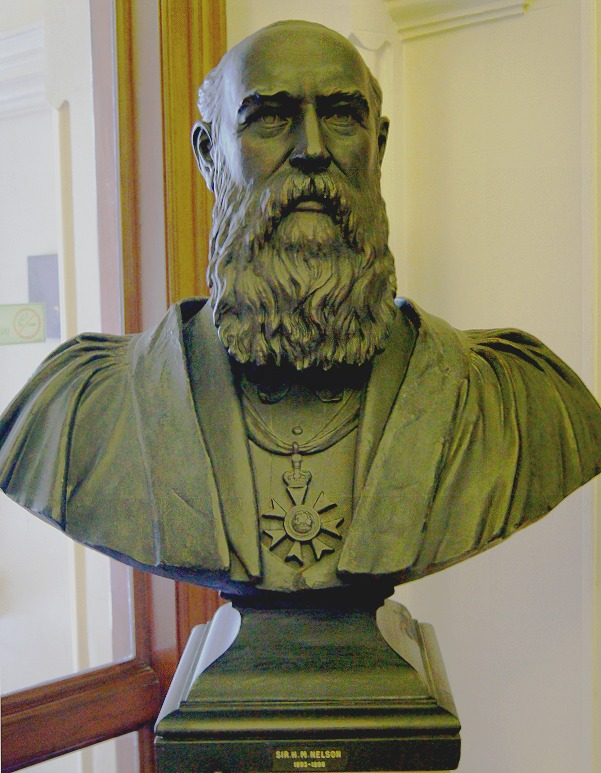
Bronze Bust of Sir Hugh M. Nelson held at Queensland Parliament

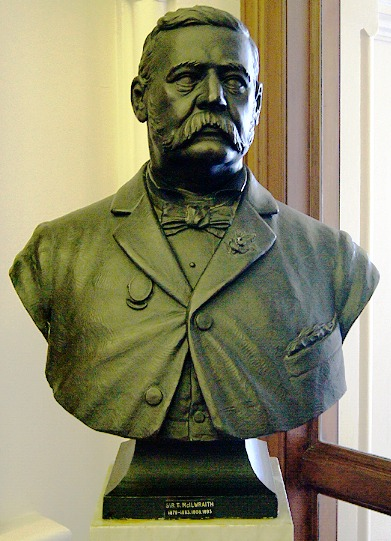
Bronze Bust of Sir Thomas McIlwraith held at Queensland Parliament

Queensland Parliament House holds a collection of Watts’ work being a bronze' portal bust of Mr. Lewis Adolphus Bernays (c. 1909) who was the Clerk of the Legislative Assembly, and Thomas Joseph Byrnes (c. 1899), Sir Hugh Nelson (c. 1906), and Sir Thomas McIlwraith, all were one-time Premiers of Queensland when the state was a colony.

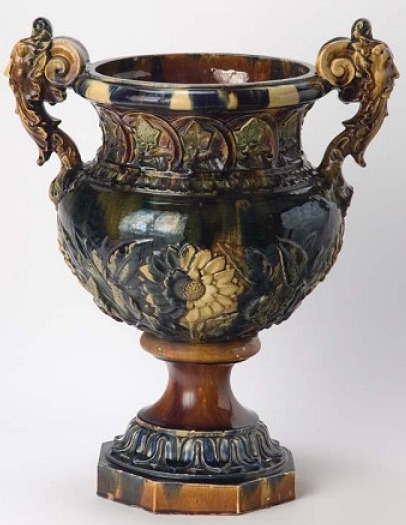
Jardiniere – James Campbell & Sons held at Queensland Art Gallery

The Queensland Art Gallery holds two items of Watts’ a Jardiniere c.1890 a product of the James Campbell and Sons pottery works and a Sketch model of the late David Bowman (c.1916). Other bust sculptures include Alderman R. Fraser, Mayor of Brisbane (c. 1895), James Campbell (c. 1906), being his employer being noted industrialist and politician along with Judge Edward Mansfield (c. 1906).

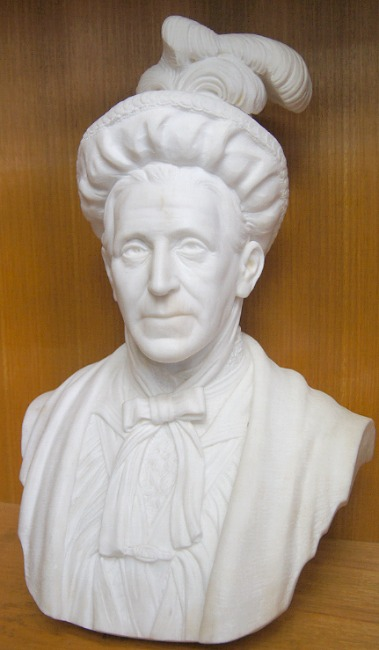
Marble Bust of Emma Miller held at Queensland Council of Unions

All of these works involve sculpturing in plaster and then in some cases bronzing. He is then commissioned in 1918 by the Queensland Trades and Labour Council to sculpture a marble bust of Emma Miller (1839–1917), a seamstress and women's rights and labour activist. That bust is now held in the Emma Miller Room at the Queensland Council of Unions.

The National Gallery of Australia holds a collection of 25 ceramic and earthenware items from James Campbell and Sons Albion and it thought that Watts was the originator of most of these items.

James Watts most noted work was a bronzed sculpture of Boer War soldier on horseback titled ‘The Scout’ which dominates the Boer War Memorial in Anzac Square in Brisbane. An agreement was made in 1912 with the Boer War Memorial committee for Watts to supply the status in its finished state for £1760. Owing to the difficulties of casting in Australia, the plaster model was sent to Parlanti Foundry, and the statue reached Australia in 1917.

The ability to cast a sculpture of this size was acquired by previous commercial sculpture work for the International Exhibition held in Brisbane during 1897. This was in the form of life-sized equestrian statue of a knight in armour for the brand Champion's Vinegar, whilst the other item is a group of cooks who are disporting themselves over a giant tin of Coleman's mustard.

== Architectural Terracotta ==
The Albion Pottery was also well known for architectural terracotta, which was incorporated into buildings of the time giving a sculptured look to the building. The South Brisbane Town Hall built in 1892 is one of the well-known buildings that still exist that employed this architecture. The exterior decoration used terracotta paneling which was supplied by James Campbell & Sons of Albion.

It is thought that Watts was the designer and modeller of this form of terracotta because during that period his name is associated with a number of commercial premises being constructed in Brisbane. He was mentioned as the modeller or architectural sculptor for the Queensland Trustees building, the Commercial Union Assurance Building, South British Insurance Company building in Queen Street and the decorative moulding on the front of the Burns, Philp and Co warehouse in Brisbane. It is not known if the latter architecture was terracotta or entailed sculpturing stone.

== Landscape Painter ==
As well as a sculptor, James Watts was also a noted landscape painter exhibiting at the Brisbane Art Society Exhibitions with many of his works being acquired by local residents. Many of his landscape paintings are of the Brisbane River around the district of Sherwood where he lived prior to moving to the suburb of Taringa.

The John Oxley Library, which contains Queensland's most comprehensive record of documented history, has two items of Watts’, a landscape painting titled "Indooroopilly Bridge after the 1893 flood" and a framed plaster cast of Robert Dunne, Catholic Archbishop of Brisbane. The latter item was mass-produced after the death of Dunne and was recommended by the Catholic Church to its parishioners. Rare examples come to auction these days and are a collector item.

== Teaching career ==
Watts was the instructor in modelling at the Central Technical College, Brisbane School of Arts as well as the Ipswich Technical College. He was one of the founders of the Queensland Art Society and served as its Vice President for many years. Being disaffected by the society, Watts and other professionals formed the New Society of Artists in 1904 and it was not until 1916 that the two societies amalgamated.

The establishment of the Queensland Art Gallery followed successful advocacy by artists Isaac Walter Jenner and Richard Godfrey Rivers. Rivers had persuaded the Mayor of Brisbane, Alderman Robert Fraser, to provide a room in the now-demolished old Brisbane Town Hall building in Queen Street. Rivers began as the voluntary curator of the gallery along with assistance from Watts and Watts’ son James Arthur Watts. His son became full-time curator on the resignation of Rivers in 1915 and remained in that post until 1949.

James Laurence Watts died early on Saturday 26 September 1925 at his home in Hillsdon Road, Taringa aged 76. The private interment took place to Toowong Cemetery on Saturday afternoon. The chief mourners were his widow, his three daughters (Mrs. Watkins and the Misses Watts), and three sons (Messrs. James Arthur, H. T., and E. W. Watts)

== Works ==
His works include:

Sculptures:

- "Christ and the woman of Samaria"
- "The Solo"
- The Scout, an equestrian statue as the South African War Memorial (1912), Brisbane, listed on the Queensland Heritage Register
- bronze portal bust of Lewis Adolphus Bernays, Clerk of the Queensland Legislative Assembly
- bust of Thomas Joseph Byrnes, Premier of Queensland
- bust of Hugh Nelson, Premier of Queensland
- bust of Thomas McIlwraith, Premier of Queensland
- marble bust of Emma Miller, prominent worker in the Labour movement, for the Trades Hall
- bronze statuette of David Bowman, leader of the Australian Labour Party
- tympanum of the Commercial Union Insurance building in Eagle Street, Brisbane

Paintings:

- ‘Lydstep Cliffs’ (c. 1883)
- 'Trinity Wharf, Milford Haven' (c. 1883)
- ‘Sylvan Spot’ (c. 1893)
- Sunset' (c. 1894)
- 'On the Edge of the Scrub,' (c. 1894)
- 'One-tree Hill' (c. 1894)
- 'A Gray Morning' (c. 1895)
- 'A Suburban Residence' (c. 1895)
- 'Calm' (C.1896)
- 'Morning' (C.1896)
- 'Night' (C.1896)
- 'Storm' (C.1896)
- 'Reflection, Deep and Silent Pool' (c. 1898)
- 'Sylvan Shade' (c. 1898)
- 'An Australian Home' (c. 1901)
- 'The Valley of the Tweed' (c. 1904)
- 'Picnic Point, near Oxley' (c. 1904)
- 'Evening' (c. 1904)
- 'A Sandpit near Oxley' (c. 1904)
- 'Mellow Morning Mists' (c. 1906)
- 'Veil of Night' (c. 1906)
