= South African War Memorial, Brisbane =

War memorial in Queensland, Australia

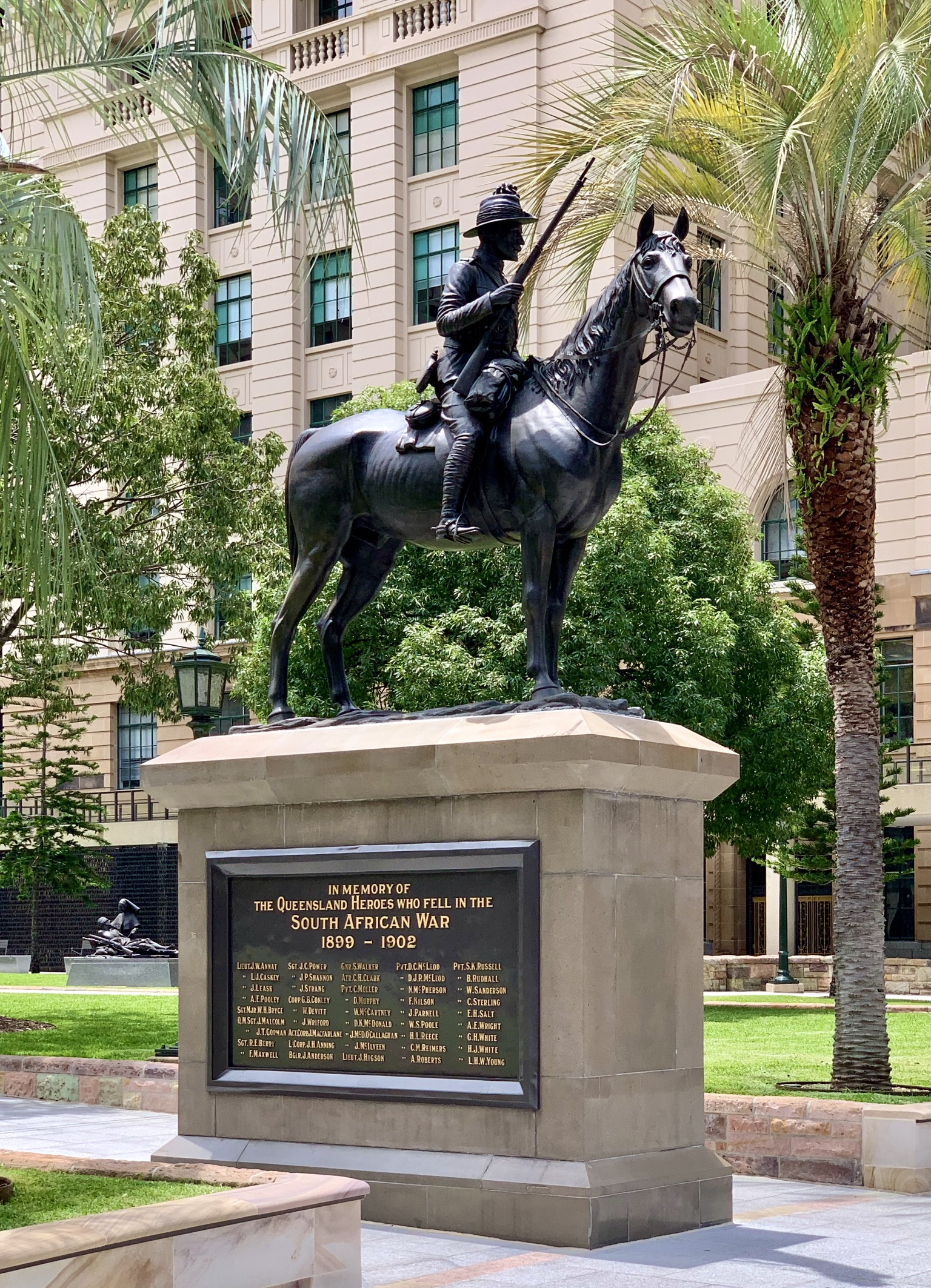
- The Scout, 2020

- Location within Queensland Location within Australia
- 27.4666°S 153.0267°E
- Location: ANZAC Square, 228 Adelaide Street, Brisbane City, City of Brisbane, Queensland, Australia

History
- Design period: 1900–1914 (early 20th century)
- Built: 1912–1919

Site notes
- Architect: James Laurence Watts

Queensland Heritage Register
- Official name: South African War Memorial, Boer War Memorial
- Type: state heritage (built)
- Designated: 21 October 1992
- Reference no.: 600060
- Significant period: 1912–1939 (historical, fabric) (relocated 1939); 1912 (social)
- Significant components: memorial – statue
- Sculptor: James Laurence Watts

South African War Memorial is a heritage-listed memorial at ANZAC Square, 228 Adelaide Street, Brisbane City, City of Brisbane, Queensland, Australia. It was sculpted by James Laurence Watts from 1912 to 1919. It is also known as Boer War Memorial and The Scout. It was added to the Queensland Heritage Register on 21 October 1992.

== History ==
The first overseas conflict in which colonial Queensland troops were involved occurred during Second Boer War (1899–1902) in South Africa. The Queensland Government despatched volunteer contingents of mounted infantrymen to the war to aid the forces of the British Commonwealth involved in the armed intervention. Eighty-nine Queenslanders died during the war. In the years after the war a public committee was established to erect a memorial to the fallen, but the funds raised were insufficient and the project lapsed.

In 1912 James Laurence Watts, a Brisbane sculptor, was commissioned to provide "an equestrian statue in bronze" for the South African Fallen Soldiers Memorial Committee. His commission was conditional on his final design being scrutinised by a panel representing "no less than four areas of expertise", which included art, veterinary surgery, architecture and soldiery. The statue, which depicts a fully equipped mounted trooper of the Queensland contingents to South African war, was sent to England to be bronzed, but the outbreak of World War I delayed its return. Watts meanwhile was also commissioned to provide another memorial in London to Queenslanders who died in South Africa.

Finally in 1919 the completed statue (known as The Scout) returned to Brisbane and was placed in a position of prominence atop the rise at the intersection of Turbot and Edward Streets, where it faced towards the City Botanic Gardens and dominated the street vista. The pedestal on which the statue sat was constructed by local firm Lowther & Sons. Queensland Governor, Sir Hamilton Goold-Adams unveiled the memorial in December 1919. The African War Veterans Association of Queensland organised annual marches to the statue on 31 May, Anniversary Day, the anniversary of the signing of the peace Treaty of Vereeniging in South Africa. The marches were followed by commemorative services on the site.

After creation of Anzac Square in 1930, the African War Veterans Association made a number of approaches for the memorial to be moved to the square. This was done in early April 1939 in time for the Anzac Day ceremonies of that year, Lowther & Sons reassembling the pedestal.

The memorial still stands in Anzac Square, fronting Adelaide Street. In 1991 restoration work was carried out on behalf of the Returned Services League.

== Description ==
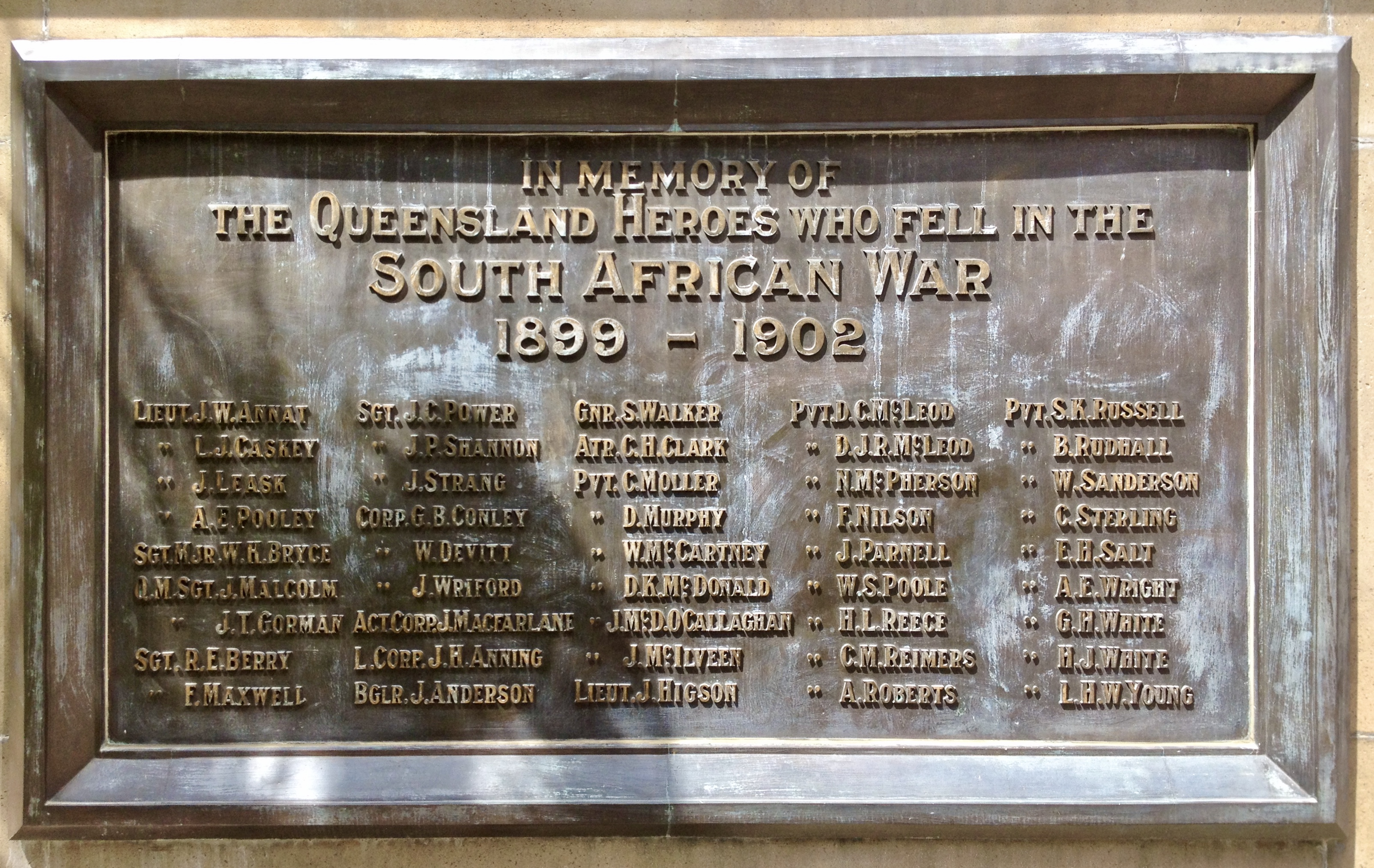
Plaque #1

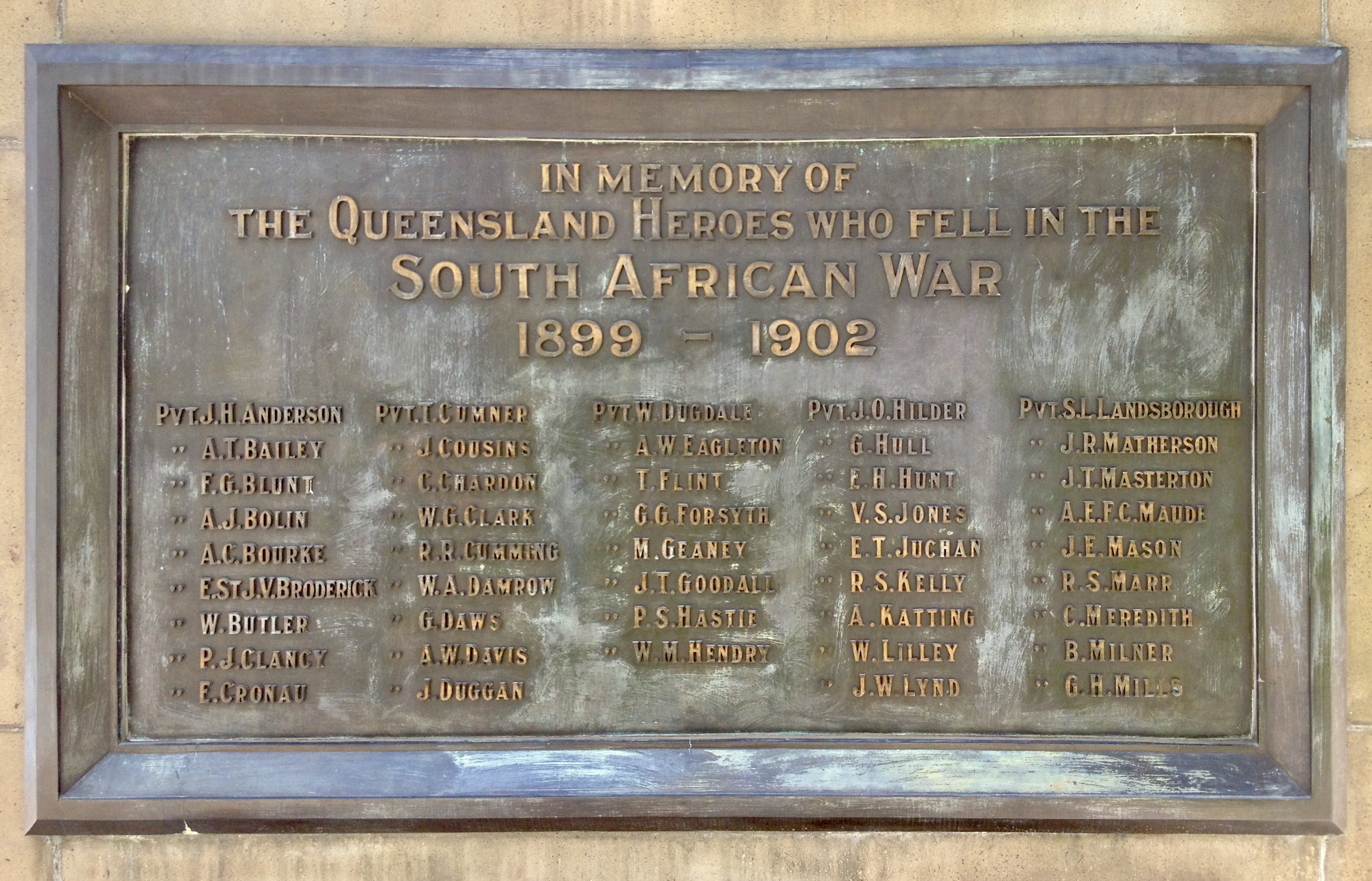
Plaque #2

The life-size bronzed statue depicts a Queensland Mounted Infantryman. Uniform and accoutrements show meticulous attention to detail, such as the Queensland hat-badge and emu plumes affixed to the slouch hat, and even the horse on which the trooper sits marked with the Queensland Government "QG" brand.

On two sides of the trachyte pedestal large bronze plaques contain the names of the eighty-nine Queensland soldiers who lost their lives in the South African war.

== Heritage listing ==
South African War Memorial was listed on the Queensland Heritage Register on 21 October 1992 having satisfied the following criteria.

The place is important in demonstrating the evolution or pattern of Queensland's history.

The South African War Memorial is significant as the only memorial in Brisbane dedicated to all members of the Queensland contingents who died during the South African conflict, and one of the few South African War memorials in the state. The Memorial reflects the strong parochial feeling still evident in post-Federation Queensland and of a continuing attachment to British Imperialism.

The place demonstrates rare, uncommon or endangered aspects of Queensland's cultural heritage.

The South African War Memorial is significant as the only memorial in Brisbane dedicated to all members of the Queensland contingents who died during the South African conflict, and one of the few South African War memorials in the state.

The South African War Memorial is significant as a rare example of the work of Brisbane sculptor J L Watts and as part of a group of war memorials in Anzac Square which retain considerable significance to the public.

The place has a strong or special association with a particular community or cultural group for social, cultural or spiritual reasons.

The Memorial reflects the strong parochial feeling still evident in post-Federation Queensland and of a continuing attachment to British Imperialism.

The South African War Memorial is significant as a rare example of the work of Brisbane sculptor J L Watts and as part of a group of war memorials in Anzac Square which retain considerable significance to the public.

The place has a special association with the life or work of a particular person, group or organisation of importance in Queensland's history.

The South African War Memorial is significant as a rare example of the work of Brisbane sculptor J L Watts and as part of a group of war memorials in Anzac Square which retain considerable significance to the public.
