= Bernay-en-Ponthieu =

- Commune
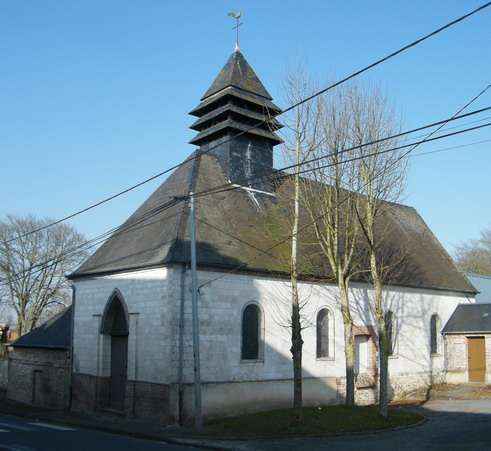
- The church in Bernay

- Coat of arms
- Location of Bernay-en-Ponthieu
- Location within France Location within Hauts-de-France
- Coordinates: 50°16′10″N 1°44′43″E
- Country: France
- Region: Hauts-de-France
- Department: Somme
- Arrondissement: Abbeville
- Canton: Rue
- Intercommunality: CC Ponthieu-Marquenterre

Government
  - Mayor (2023–2026): Grégory Dufour
- Area^{1}: 9.97 km^{2} (3.85 sq mi)
- Elevation: 23 m (75 ft)
- Highest elevation: 47 m (154 ft)
- Lowest elevation: 2 m (6.6 ft)
- Population (2023): 240
  - Density: 24/km^{2} (62/sq mi)
- Time zone: UTC+01:00 (CET)
  - Summer (DST): UTC+02:00 (CEST)
- INSEE/Postal code: 80087 /80120
- ^{1} French Land Register data, which excludes lakes, ponds, glaciers > 1 km^{2} (0.386 sq mi or 247 acres) and river estuaries.

Bernay-en-Ponthieu is a commune in the Somme department in Hauts-de-France in northern France.

== Geography ==
The commune is situated on the RD 1001 road (ex-RN1), next to the A16 autoroute, some 15 miles (24 km) north of Abbeville.

== Population ==
Historical population
Year	Pop.	±% p.a.
1968	264	—
1975	251	−0.72%
1982	215	−2.19%
1990	194	−1.28%
1999	202	+0.45%
2007	241	+2.23%
2012	235	−0.50%
2017	231	−0.34%
2023	240	+0.64%
Source: INSEE

== Places of interest ==
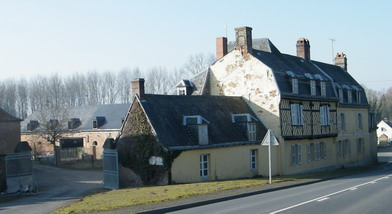
The relais de poste.

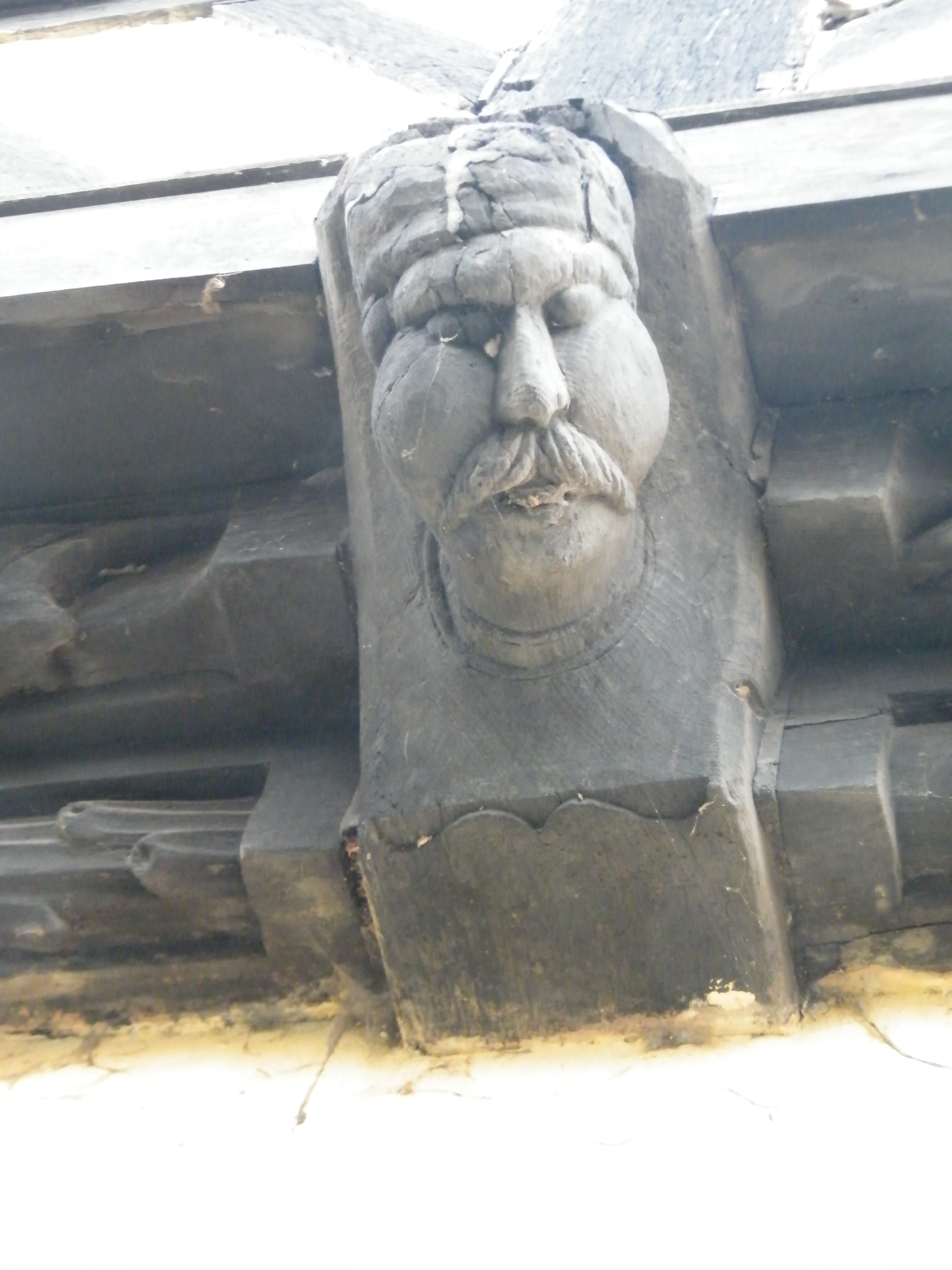
One of the blochets.

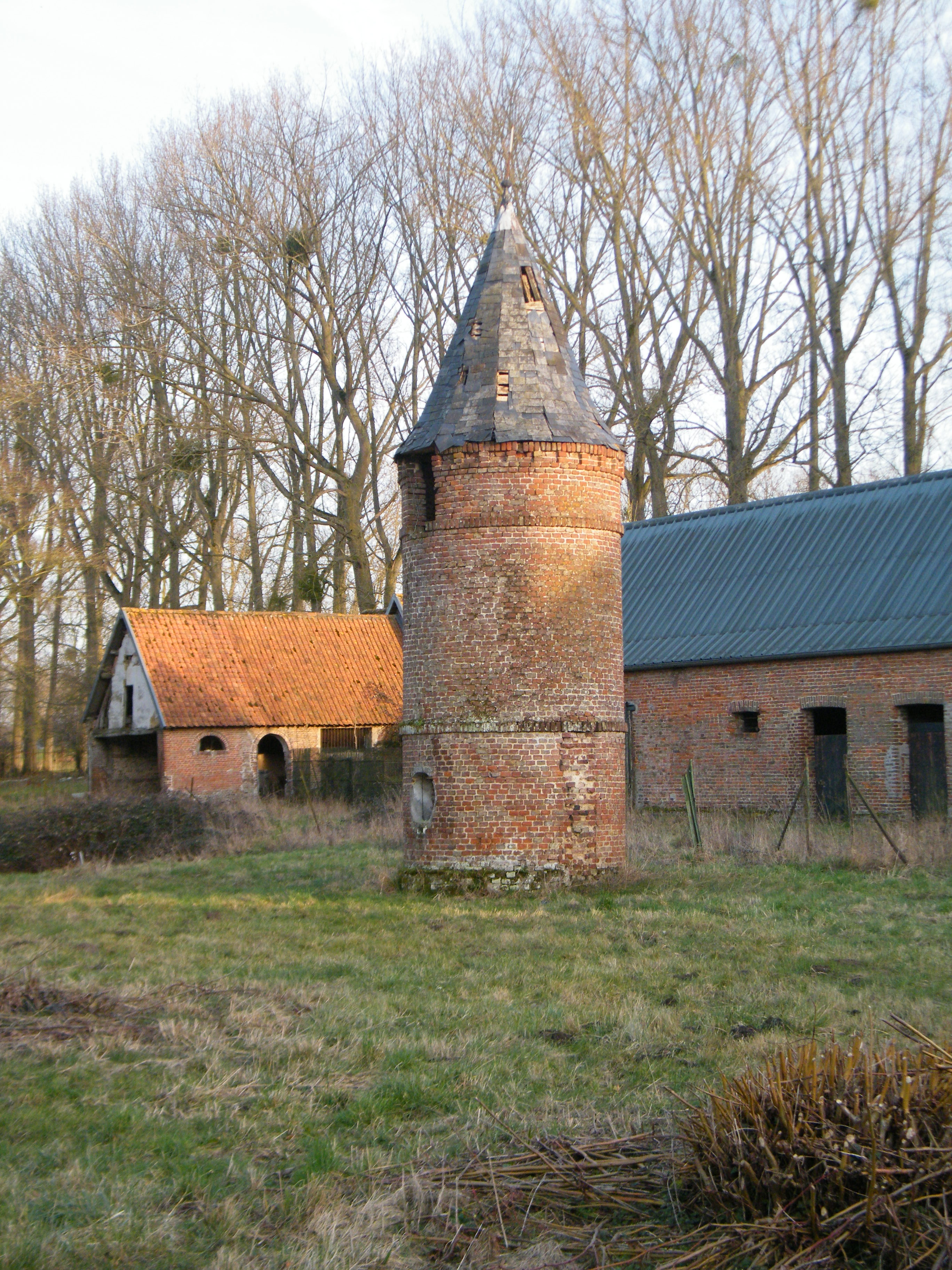
Dovecotes tower

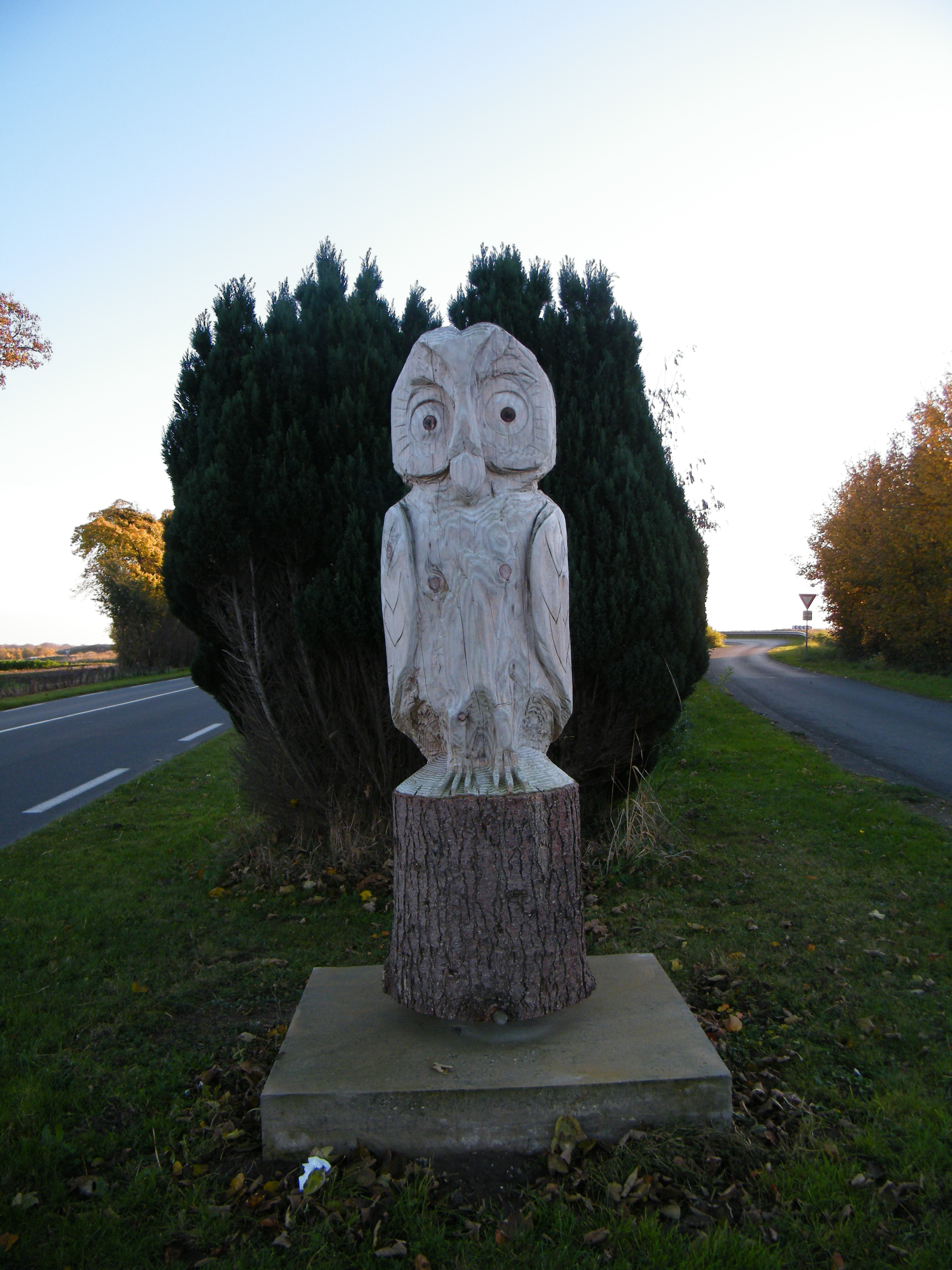
Roadside sculpture

== See also ==
- Communes of the Somme department
