= Leandro Bassano =

Italian painter (1557–1622)

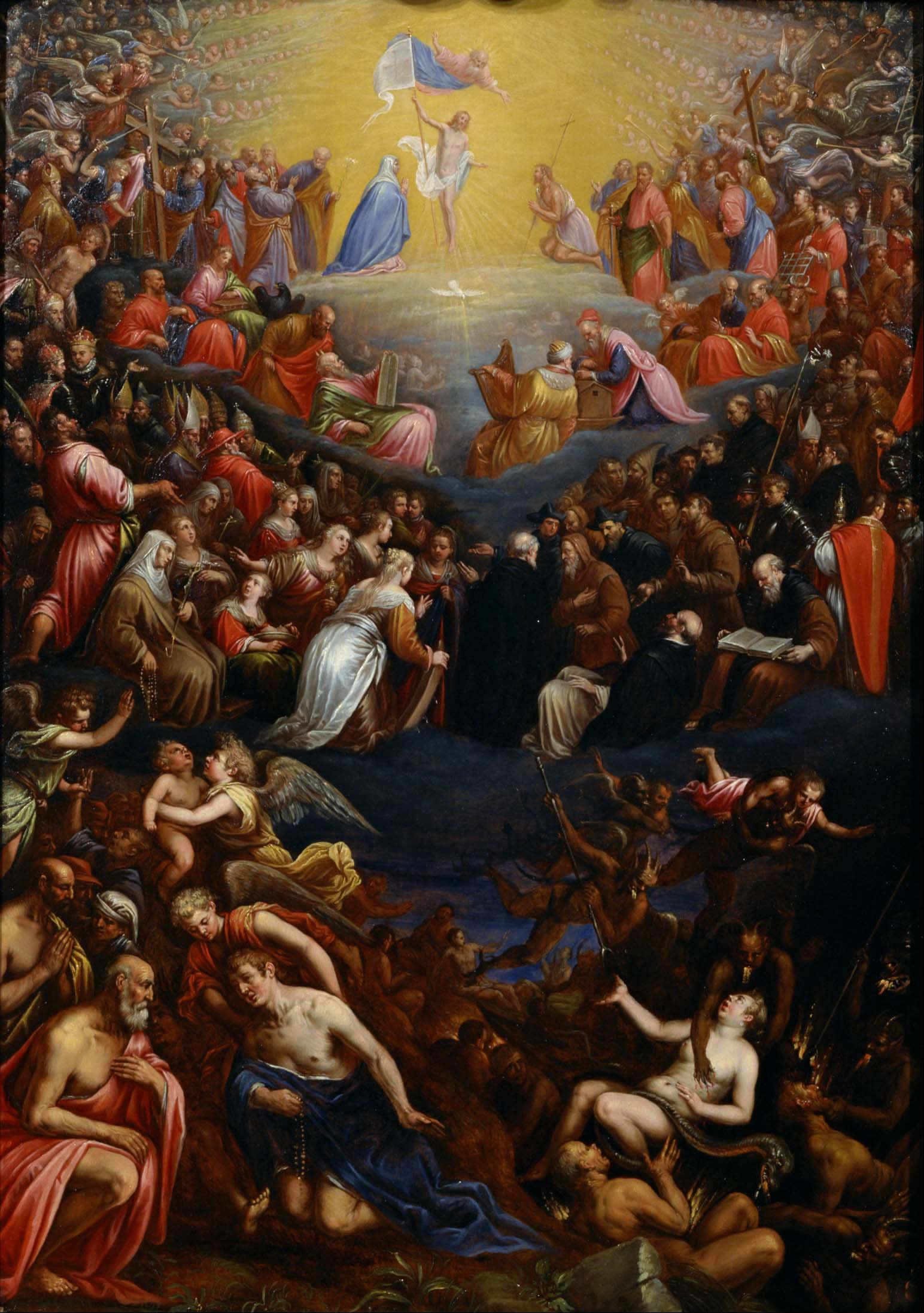
The Last Judgement (National Museum of Western Art) Tokyo.

Leandro Bassano (10 June 1557 – 15 April 1622), also called Leandro dal Ponte, was an Italian Renaissance painter from Bassano del Grappa who was awarded a knighthood by the Doge of Venice. He was the younger brother of artist Francesco Bassano the Younger and third son of artist Jacopo Bassano. Their father took his surname from their town of Bassano del Grappa, and trained his sons as painters.

== Education and early career ==
Leandro studied with his brothers in their father's workshop. After Francesco opened a workshop in Venice before 1575, Leandro took over the studio in Bassano del Grappa. Leandro followed in the tradition of his father's religious works, but also became independently well known as a portrait painter.

By around 1575, Leandro had become an important assistant to his father. His father wanted Leandro to carry on the studio in Bassano del Grappa. Shortly after their father died, his brother Francesco committed suicide.

== Move to Venice ==
Leandro moved to Venice, taking over the family studio there. He became a successful portraitist, working close to the influential style of Venetian master Tintoretto.

Leandro developed his style, taking in Venetian influence and furthering his fine drawing style. His approach to painting differed from his father's in the use of "fine brushwork, with cool, light colours, smoothly applied in well-defined areas, unlike his father, who painted with dense and robust brushstrokes."

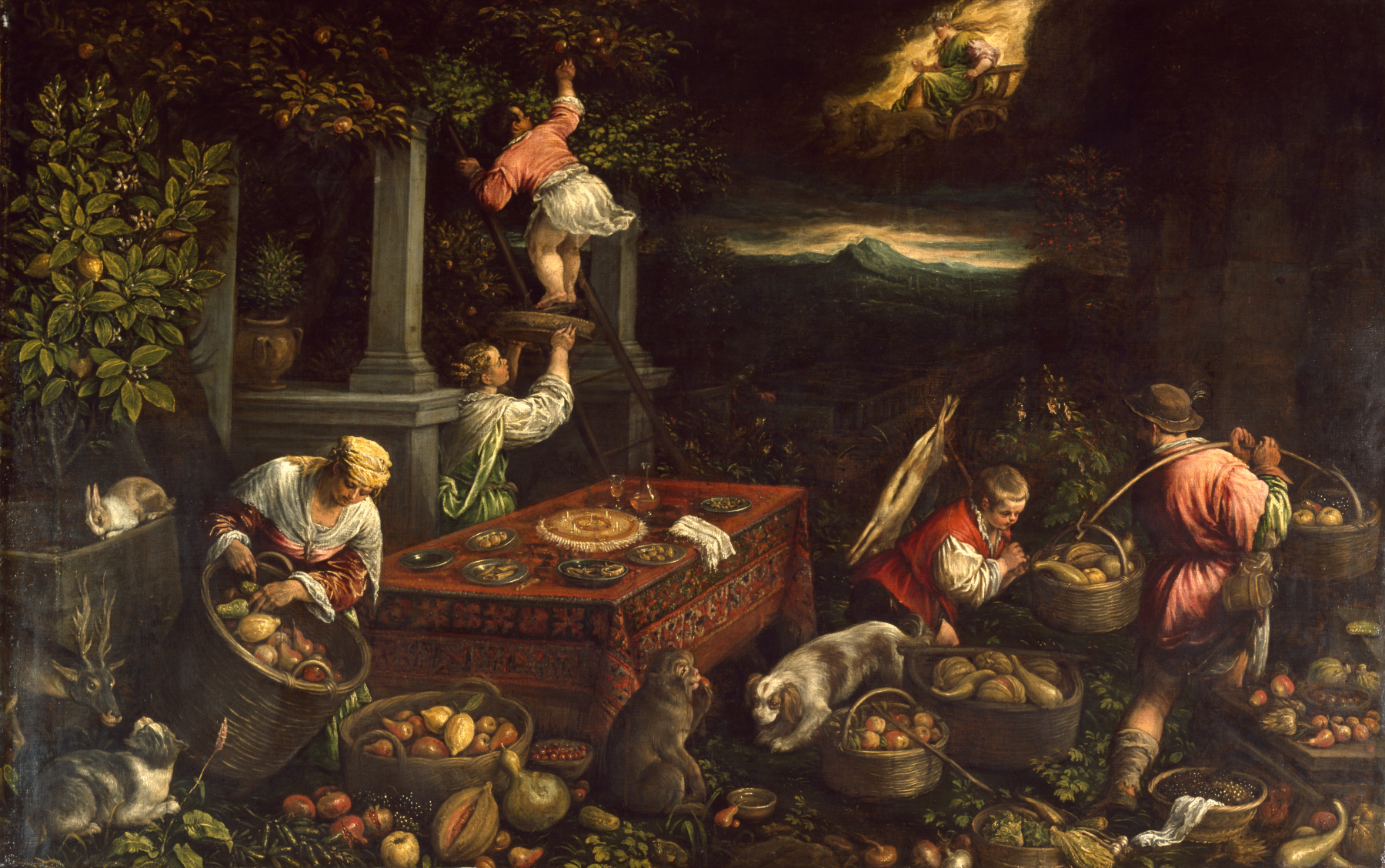
Painting by Bassano, Allegory of the Element Earth, believed in the 16th century to be one of the four elements. The Walters Art Museum.

His success grew substantially in Venice. Leandro was awarded a knighthood from Doge of Venice Marino Grimani in 1595. He lived his remaining days in that city, working as a painter. With the knighthood, Leandro began to sign his name with the honorary, "Eques". Much of his work is not clearly dated, and his works have sometimes been confused with other artists. His Portrait of an Old Man in the Museum of Fine Arts, Budapest was once attributed to Tintoretto.

In addition to his many portraits and religious pieces, Leandro painted secular, genre works, such as his Concert, now in the Uffizi Gallery, and his Kitchen Scene, displayed in the Indiana University Art Museum in the United States. The Prado Museum in Madrid holds a collection of seven Works by Bassano including religious, portraits, mythological and a veduta similar to other preserved at the Real Academia de Bellas Artes de San Fernando also located in Madrid.

== Selected works ==
Portraits

- Portrait of an Old Man, Oil in canvas, (Museum of Fine Arts, Budapest)
- Portrait of an Old Woman, Oil on canvas, (Hermitage Museum)
- Portrait of a Man, Oil on canvas, (Ringling Museum)
- Portrait of a Man, Oil on canvas, (Indianapolis Museum of Art)
- Portrait of a Man, Oil on canvas, (Art Gallery of Ontario)
- Portrait of a Widow at her Devotions, Oil on canvas, (Private collection)
- Penelope, Oil in canvas, (Musée des Beaux-Arts de Rennes)
- Procurator of San Marco or Portrait of Duke of Candia Giovanni Francesco Sagredo, Oil on canvas, (Ashmolean Museum)
- Portrait of Jacopo Bassano, Oil on canvas, (Museo del Prado, Madrid)
- Magistrate with Crucifix, Oil on canvas (Museo del Prado, Madrid)
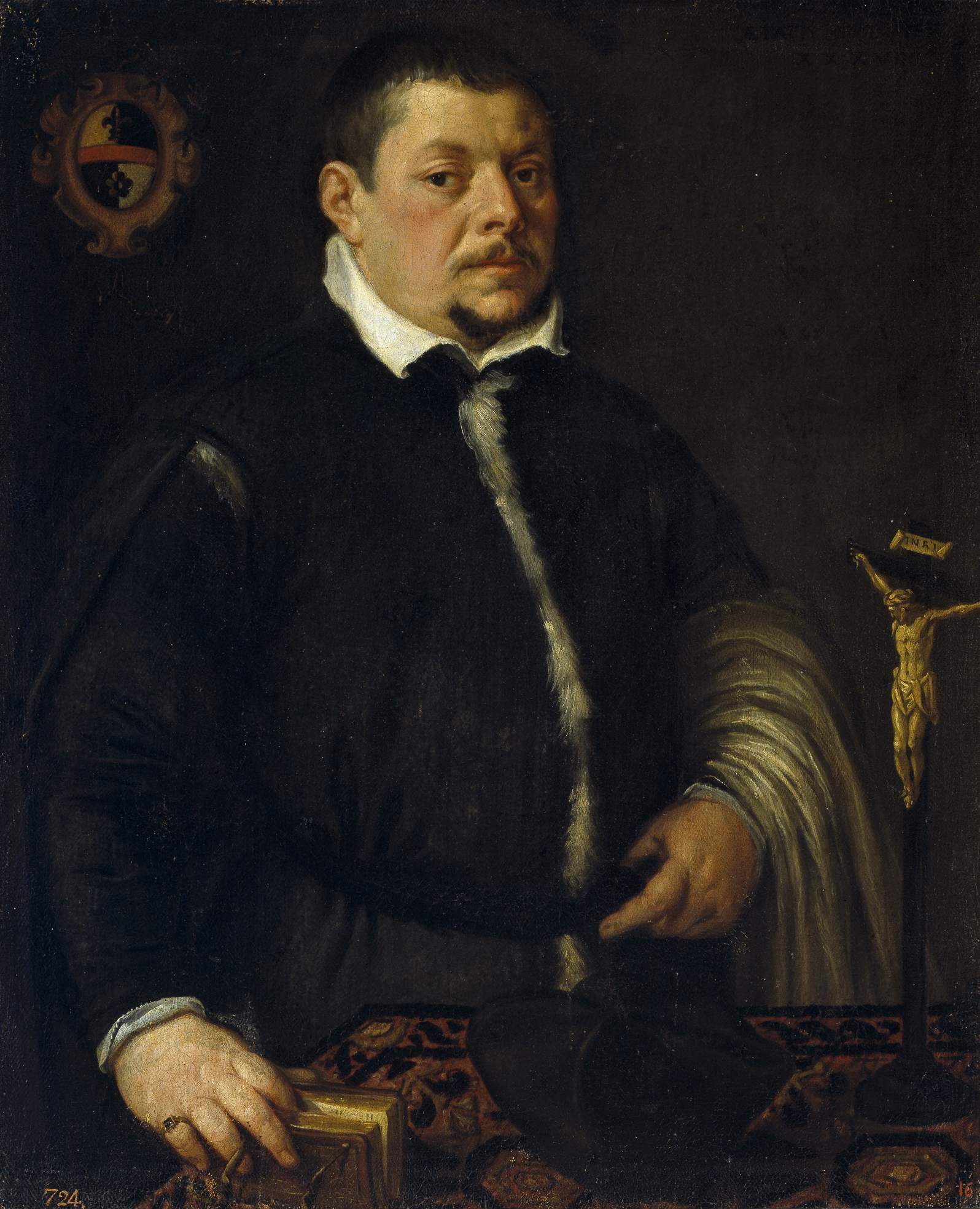
  Portrait of a Magistrat with a crucifix, Prado Museum, Madrid.

Religious Works

- Angel, Oil on canvas, National Museum of Serbia, Belgrade
- Marriage at Cana, Oil on canvas, (The Louvre)
- Incredulity of St Thomas, Oil on canvas, (Hermitage Museum)
- Moses Striking the Rock, Oil on canvas, (The Louvre)
- Expulsion of the merchants of the Temple, Oil on canvas, (Museum of the fine arts, Lille)
- Carrying of the Cross, Oil on black slate, (Hermitage Museum)
- Christ at the house of Simon the Pharisee, Chalk on paper, (Fitzwilliam Museum)
- Last Supper
- Last Judgment, Oil on copper, (Birmingham Museum of Art)
- Lucretia, Oil on canvas, (Gallerie dell'Accademia)
- The Tower of Babel, Oil on canvas, (National Gallery, London)
- Noah's sacrifice after the flood, Oil on canvas, (Real Academia de Bellas Artes de San Fernando, Madrid).

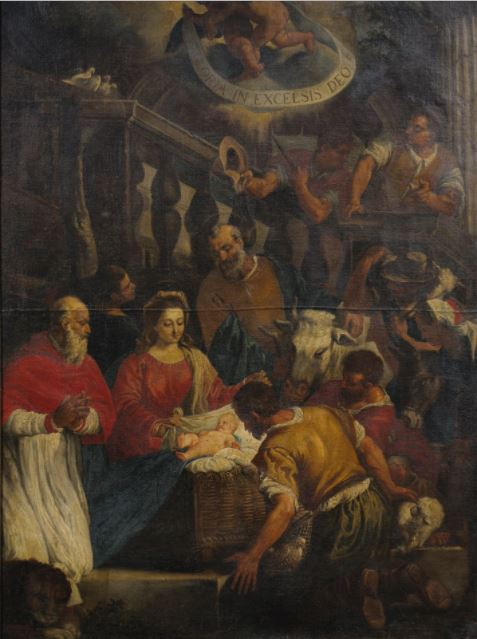
The Adoration of the Shepherds

- The Adoration of the Shepherds (after Jacopo Bassano), Chalk on paper, (National Galleries of Scotland)

Other

- La Riva degli Schiavoni, Oil on canvas, (Real Academia de Bellas Artes de San Fernando)
- Concert, Oil on canvas, (Uffizi Gallery)
- Kitchen Scene, Oil on canvas, (Indiana University Art Museum)
- Berenice, Oil on burlap, (Ca' Rezzonico)
- Fish market by the sea, circa 1578, Oil on canvas, (Musée des beaux-arts, Angoulême)
- Allegory of the Element Earth, circa 1580. The Walters Art Museum.
