= Johann Jakob Kneucker =

German theologian

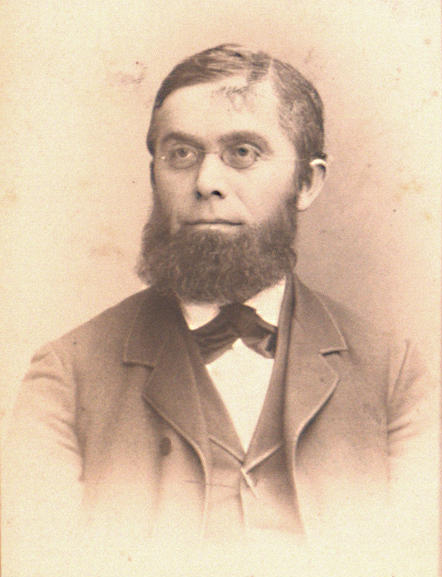
Johann Jakob Kneucker

Johann Jakob Kneucker (12 February 1840 – 25 December 1909) was a German theologian born in the village of Wenkheim, today part of Werbach, Baden-Württemberg.

In 1873 he received his habilitation at the University of Heidelberg, where in 1877 he became an associate professor to the theological faculty. He specialized in the fields of Old Testament exegesis and Semitic languages.

His best known written work was an edition of the Book of Baruch, titled "Das Buch Baruch, Geschichte und Kritik" (The Book of Baruch, History and Critique, 1879). Another significant publication of his was "Die Anfänge des Römischen Christenthums" (Beginnings of Roman Christendom, 1881).
