= Michael Bernays =

German philologist (1834–1897)

- Born: 27 November 1834; Hamburg
- Died: 25 February 1897 (aged 62)
- Occupation: literary historian
- Parent: Isaac Bernays

Michael Bernays (27 November 1834 – 25 February 1897) was a German literary historian, and an important Goethe and Shakespeare scholar.

== Life ==
He was born in Hamburg. His father, Isaac Bernays, died when he was 14 years old. His adjustments were radically different from that of his two brothers, Jacob Bernays and Berman Bernays (1826–1879), due to the traumatic loss of his father at an early age or other factors. He first studied law and then literature at the University of Bonn and Heidelberg University.

== Career ==
He obtained a considerable reputation by his lectures on Shakespeare at Leipzig University and an explanatory text to Beethoven's music to Egmont. Having refused in 1866 an invitation to take part in the editorship of the Preussische Jahrbücher, in the same year he published his celebrated Zur Kritik und Geschichte des Goetheschen Textes.

He confirmed his reputation by his lectures at Leipzig University, and in 1873 accepted the post of extraordinary professor of German literature at the Ludwig-Maximilians-Universität München specially created for him by Ludwig II of Bavaria. Thus, he became the first ever professor of modern German literary history at the Ludwig-Maximilians-Universität München. For a while, he was reader to Ludwig II of Bavaria. In 1874, he became an ordinary professor, a position which he resigned only in 1889 when he settled in Karlsruhe. He died there on 25 February 1897.

Along with Ludwig Geiger, he started a critical Goethe philosophy. Geiger edited the influential Goethe-Jahrbuch for more than thirty years.

At an early age, he became a Jewish Christian, whereas his brother Jacob remained a Rabbinical Jew. Among his other publications were: Briefe Goethes an F. A. Wolf (1868); Zur Entstehungsgeschichte des Schlegelschen Shakespeare (1872); and an introduction to Hirzel's collection entitled Der junge Goethe (1875). He also edited a revised edition of Voss's translation of the Odyssey. From his literary remains were published Schriften zur Kritik und Litteraturgeschichte (1895–1899).

== Works ==
- Zur Kritik und Geschichte des Goetheschen-Textes (1866)
- Briefe Goethes an F. A. Wolf (1868)
- Zur Entstehungsgeschichte des Schlegelschen Shakespeare. Leipzig 1872, new ed. Celtis Verlag, Berlin 2013, ISBN 978-3-944253-02-2
- An introduction to Hirzel's collection entitled Der junge Goethe (1875)
- A revised edition of Voss's translation of the Odyssey
- (from his literary remains) Schriften zur Kritik und Litteraturgeschichte (1895–1899)
