= Ludwig Hirzel (theologian) =

Swiss theologian (1801–1841)

Ludwig Hirzel (27 August 1801 – 13 April 1841) was a Swiss theologian born in Zürich. His son, also named Ludwig Hirzel (1838-1897), was a noted literary historian.

Hirzel studied theology at the Carolinum in Zürich then continued his education in Germany, where he focused on Old Testament studies and Oriental languages. In 1823 he returned to Zürich, where he taught classes on Hebrew language and theology at the Carolinum. In 1833 he became an associate professor of theology at the newly established University of Zürich.

He was the author of Kurzgefaßten exegetischen Handbuchs zum alten Testament, (Concise exegetical textbook of the Old Testament, 1839) and Kommentar zum Hiob (Commentary on Job, 1839), the second work being republished in 1869 by August Dillmann (1823-1894) in its third edition.
