= Ludwig Hirzel (historian) =

Ludwig Hirzel (23 February 1838 – 1 June 1897) was a Swiss literary historian born in Zürich. His father, also named Ludwig Hirzel (1801–1841) was a professor of theology at the University of Zürich.

In 1862 he earned his doctorate from the University of Zürich. Afterwards he served as a secondary school teacher in Frauenfeld (1862) and at the cantonal school in Aarau (1866). In 1874 he became a professor of German language and literature at the University of Berne, a position he maintained until his death in 1897.

Among Hirzel's literary output were books on famous writers such as Goethe, Schiller and Wieland. He was the author of acclaimed editions of Albrecht von Haller's poetry (1882) and diaries (1883). He also penned an essay on Swiss mathematician Conrad Dasypodius, and published editions of Wieland's Geschichte der Gelehrtheit (History of the Scholars) and Beziehungen zu den deutschen Romantikern (Connections to the German Romanticists).

== Selected publications ==
- Goethes italienische Reise (Goethe's Italian Journey), (Basel 1871)
- Schillers Beziehungen zum Altertum (Schiller's Association with Antiquity), (Aarau 1872)
- Karl Ruckstuhl. Ein Beitrag zur Goethe-Litteratur (Karl Ruckstuhl, a Contribution to "Goethe-literature"), (Straßburg 1876)
- Wieland und Martin und Regula Künzli, 1891

== Sources ==
- translated biography @ Allgemeine Deutsche Biographie
