= Adolphus Bernays =

Adolphus Bernays (18 May 1795 – 22 December 1864) was the first professor of German in the King's College in London, and second professor of German in England.

== Biography ==
Adolphus Bernays was born into the Jewish family of Jakob Bernays, in Mainz, Electorate of Mainz. His older brother was Isaac Bernays, later the important chief rabbi of Hamburg.

Adolphus Bernays became the first Professor of German in 1831 at King's College London Strand Campus. The college itself was founded in 1829. He published numerous books to assist his tuition, among them A Compendious German Grammar stood several editions. He was naturalized in 1854. Bernays served at the college for over 30 years until 1863, one year before his death at the age of 69.

== Private life ==
On 17 October 1818 in London, Adolphus Bernays married Martha Arrowsmith, daughter of Aaron Arrowsmith and Catherine Sophia Palmer. They had 9 children, among them Lewis Adolphus Bernays (1831–1908), public servant and agricultural writer in Queensland, Australia, and Albert James Bernays, English chemist. His great-grandson was Robert Bernays MP. Adolphus died at The Rectory, Great Stanmore, Middlesex.

== Bibliography ==
- A Compendious German Grammar. 1843, 1932, 2010 (and other editions).
- German Phrase-Book: A Guide to the Formation of Sentences for Conversation and Composition for the Use of Students and Travelers. 2010. (and other editions)
- German Word-Book; a Comparative Vocabulary Displaying the Close Affinity Between the German and English Languages. 2010.
- Familiar German Exercises
- German Poetical Anthology (Ed.), London, 1935.
- German Prose Anthology (Ed.)
- An introductory lecture delivered in King's College, London, November 2, 1831. London, 1831.
- A key to the difficulties, philological and historical, of the first book of Schiller's Thirty Years' War. Wertheim, 1838.
