= Jakob Bernays =

German philologist and philosophical writer (1824–1881)

Jacob Bernays (11 September 1824 – 26 May 1881) was a German philologist and philosophical writer.

== Life ==
Jacob Bernays was born in Hamburg to Jewish parents. His father, Isaac Bernays (1792–1849) was a man of wide culture and the first orthodox German rabbi to preach in the vernacular; his brother, Michael Bernays, was also a distinguished scholar.

Between 1844 and 1848, Bernays studied classical philology at the University of Bonn under Friedrich Gottlieb Welcker, Christian August Brandis, and Friedrich Wilhelm Ritschl, of whom Bernays became a favourite pupil.

In 1853, he accepted the chair of classical philology at the newly founded Jewish Theological Seminary of Breslau, where he formed a close friendship with Theodor Mommsen. In 1866, when Ritschl left Bonn for Leipzig, Bernays returned to his old university as extraordinary professor and chief librarian. He remained in Bonn until his death on 26 May 1881. Upon his death, he bequeathed his Hebrew library to the Jewish Theological Seminary of Breslau.

== Scholarship ==
Bernays was most famous for his book Grundzüge der verlorenen Abhandlung des Aristoteles über Wirkung der Tragödie. His medical interpretation of catharsis greatly influenced Friedrich Nietzsche and Sigmund Freud.

Bernays was the first scholar to suggest that Aristotle's Protrepticus inspired Cicero to write the Hortensius. He further suggested that the Hortensius should be used as the base by which the Protrepticus could be reconstructed.

== Works ==
His chief works, which deal mainly with the Greek philosophers, are:

- Joseph Justus Scaliger (1855)
- Über das Phokylidische Gesicht (1856)
- Grundzüge der verlorenen Abhandlung des Aristoteles über Wirkung der Tragödie (1857)
- Über die Chronik des Sulpicius Severus (1861)
- Die Dialoge des Aristoteles im Verhältniss zu seinen übrigen Werken (1863)
- Theophrastos' Schrift über Frömmigkeit (1866)
- Die Heraklitischen Briefe (1869)
- Lucian und die Kyniker (1879)
- Zwei Abhandlungen über die Aristotelische Theorie des Dramas (1880).

The last of these was a republication of his Grundzüge der verlorenen Abhandlungen des Aristoteles über die Wirkung der Tragödie (1857), which aroused considerable controversy.

== See also ==
- Protrepticus (Aristotle)
- Hortensius (Cicero)
