= Robert Bernays =

British politician (1902–1945)

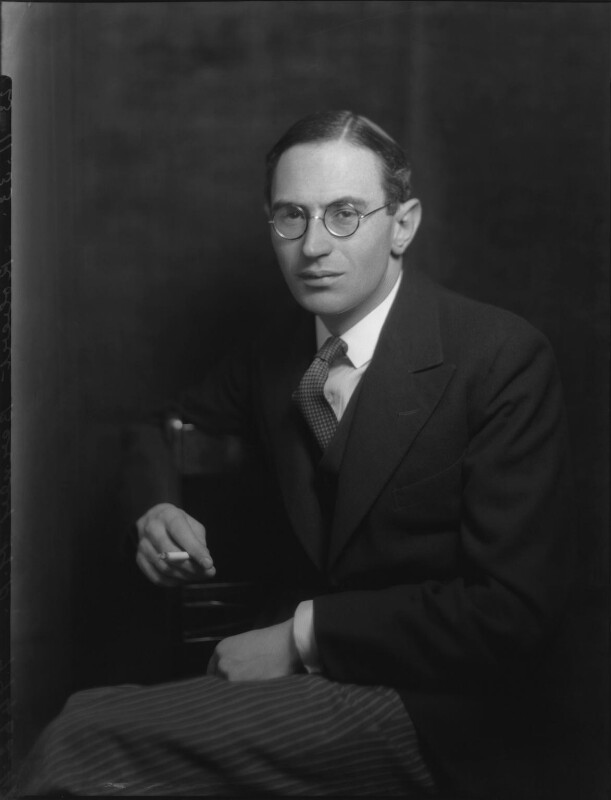

Member of Parliament for Bristol North
- In office 1931–1945
- Preceded by: Walter Ayles
- Succeeded by: William Coldrick

Parliamentary Secretary to the Ministry of Health
- In office 1937–1939
- Preceded by: Robert Hudson
- Succeeded by: Florence Horsbrugh

Parliamentary Secretary to the Ministry of Transport
- In office 1939–1940
- Preceded by: Austin Hudson
- Succeeded by: Frederick Montague

Personal details
- Born: Robert Hamilton Bernays; 6 May 1902
- Died: 23 January 1945 (aged 42) Adriatic Sea
- Cause of death: Plane crash
- Party: Liberal National
- Other political affiliations: Liberal Party
- Spouse: Nancy Britton (m. 1942)
- Children: 2
- Education: Worcester College, Oxford

Robert Hamilton Bernays (6 May 1902 – 23 January 1945) was a Liberal Party and later Liberal National politician in the United Kingdom who served as a Member of Parliament (MP) from 1931 to 1945.

== Early life ==
Bernays was the third son and fourth and youngest child of Lillian Jane (Stephenson) Bernays and Stewart Frederick Lewis Bernays, a Church of England clergyman who became Rector first of Stanmore, and later (1924) of Finchley, both in North London. He was the great-grandson of German Jewish Professor Adolphus Bernays. He was educated at Rossall School and Worcester College, Oxford, where he was president of the Oxford Union in 1925. After university he became a journalist on The Daily News (which became the News Chronicle in 1930 after a series of newspaper mergers), and practised the profession until entering government, despite occasional clashes with his employers because of the independent line he took in the internal clashes among Liberal factions in the late 1920s and early 1930s. Finding himself dropped by the News Chronicle after it supplanted the Daily News in the summer of 1930, he travelled with the then leader of the Liberal Party in the House of Lords, Earl Beauchamp, to Australia, and thence, alone, to India. The result was his book about Mahatma Gandhi, Naked Fakir (1931; published as Naked Faquir in the United States in 1932).

== Early political career ==
He stood unsuccessfully for Parliament as a Liberal at Rugby in the 1929 general election (losing, after the campaign was interrupted and polling delayed for six weeks by the Labour candidate's death, to the incumbent Conservative, the future Chief Whip David Margesson); but, following the positive reception afforded Naked Fakir, he was adopted as Liberal candidate for Bristol North – a seat once held by the distinguished Liberal Cabinet Minister Augustine Birrell – at the 1931 general election. He was elected with a majority of 13,214 over the incumbent, Labour MP Walter Ayles, who had twice won the seat, in 1923 and 1929, when the non-Labour vote was split between two other candidates. That there was no Conservative candidate, in an election that saw the Conservatives win 55% of the national vote, does much to explain the size of Bernays's majority; and this fact, coupled with Ayles's record of winning when he had two opponents rather than one – he lost to a single Liberal rival in both 1922 and 1924, while beating a Liberal and a Conservative in 1923 and a Liberal and an independent in 1929 – likewise explains why, throughout the period 1931–1935, one of Bernays's chief preoccupations was to ensure that the Conservatives should hold him in sufficiently high esteem to refrain from opposing him at the next election. (Writing to his married sister Lucy Brereton in July 1935, he commented that "my problem is not to capture the Liberal vote but to hold the Conservatives".)

Bernays made a slow start in the House of Commons – his maiden speech was affected by the stammer which continued in debate (he preferred making prepared speeches rather than impromptu interventions because of it), and he was hors de combat for some time in 1932 after having his appendix removed. That autumn, however, he visited Germany for the first time to observe political developments there; he subsequently developed an expert knowledge of the country and was a consistent and determined critic of the Nazis after their accession to power in early 1933. His account of his journalistic and political travels between 1930 and 1933, Special Correspondent, was published in 1934. During his visit to Nazi Germany he nearly secured an interview with Adolf Hitler before admitting to the Foreign Press Bureau chief Ernst Hanfstaengl that he was an MP for the Liberal Party led by the British Jewish politician Sir Herbert Samuel.

When the official Liberal Party (the 'Samuelites', so named after party leader Herbert Samuel) left the National Government, led by Ramsay MacDonald, over the Imperial Preference-versus-Free Trade issue in November 1933, Bernays (along with three other followers of Samuel: Joseph Leckie, William McKeag, and Joseph Maclay) remained on the government benches, with the Liberal National Party MPs (or 'Simonites,' led by Sir John Simon), although Bernays himself, unlike Leckie and McKeag, did not yet openly become a 'Simonite.' As early as July 1934, however, in a letter to Lucy Brereton, he was distinguishing himself from "[t]he poor old Samuel Liberals" and their "frightful position"; yet in December of the same year, writing to Lucy once more, he referred to the official Liberals as "we" and called Samuel his "leader"; while in March 1935 he told his sister that he was "very seriously thinking" of "asking for the government whip". In short, he agonised about his party affiliation for some time. He was re-elected at the 1935 general election as a "Liberal independent of all groups in the party" – again without Conservative opposition, though with a drastically reduced majority (over Ayles) of 4,828 – and finally joined the Liberal Nationals in September 1936 (though he seems to have been in negotiations with them even before the 1935 election). His decision to end his period of vacillation may have been motivated by a sense that he had burned his bridges with the official Liberals (no longer 'Samuelite', since Samuel had lost his seat in 1935 and the party was now led by Sir Archibald Sinclair), and that it would be hard for him to advance in his political career as an independent Liberal; while as a Liberal National he would be eligible for office in the National Government without having to go the whole hog and become a Conservative (an option which, many entries in his diaries suggest, would have been not only politically but also personally repugnant to him). It may also have been connected with the tragic death of his mother Lillian, who, after a long period of depressive illness and voluntary residence in nursing homes, was found dead in the River Thames just before Christmas 1935. Bernays' sense that he needed to recover his psychological equilibrium and rebuild his career after his mother's death and the publicity it provoked is evident in his diary entries from early 1936. (A coroner's inquest recorded an open verdict on Mrs Bernays, but suicide must have been suspected, at a time when the stigma attached to it could still be seriously damaging to any relative of the victim who was a public figure in Britain.) Bernays's father remarried in 1937; Bernays acted as his best man.

== In government ==
When Neville Chamberlain replaced Stanley Baldwin as prime minister in May 1937, Bernays was appointed as Parliamentary Secretary to the Ministry of Health in the National Government, serving under Sir Kingsley Wood. Wood was succeeded, upon being appointed Secretary of State for Air in May 1938, by Bernays's old friend and occasional political patron Walter Elliot. Personal loyalty to Elliot (the two had remained friendly even after Elliot, in 1934, had married Katharine Tennant, whom Bernays himself had courted in the early 1930s) may have helped to keep Bernays in his job after the Munich crisis that autumn, when Harold Nicolson and many of Bernays's other friends and associates thought he should have followed through on his earlier threats to resign because of the government's policy of appeasement of Hitler and the Nazis. He moved in July 1939 to become Parliamentary Secretary to the Ministry of Transport (under Euan Wallace), and held that post until he left government when Winston Churchill took over as prime minister in May 1940. (Although he was on friendly terms with Churchill during the 1930s and sometimes supported his attacks on the National Government over such matters as India, their association seems not to have been close enough to keep him in office when it became necessary for Winston Churchill to find places in his war cabinet for members of the Labour Party.)

He was also, especially after their ten-week trip to East Africa Protectorate in early 1937 as members of a governmental commission on colonial education, a very close friend of the writer and National Labour MP Harold Nicolson, in whose celebrated diaries he is frequently mentioned. This, along with remarks in Bernays's own diaries and letters (such as "I suppose that what I really want in a woman is that kind of mental affinity which I get from someone like H[arold] N[icolson]" and "he is very fond of me as I am of him", has led to suggestions that they were actually involved in a discreet homosexual relationship. Previously Hugh Grosvenor, 2nd Duke of Westminster had reported, to King George V among others, that Bernays had been a lover of the 7th Earl Beauchamp – Westminster's brother-in-law – on their Australian travels in 1930. (Bernays remained on friendly terms with Beauchamp after the latter's disgrace and departure for exile in Paris, visiting him there at least once, in April 1936.) Whatever the truth of these rumours (and his published diaries are full of appreciative comments about the beauty of young women, some of whom he seems to have pursued with a view to marriage, which may suggest that he was at most bisexual – as perhaps was Beauchamp, who fathered seven children), Bernays eventually, in 1942, married Nancy Britton, the daughter of George Bryant Britton (Coalition Liberal M.P. for Bristol East from 1918 to 1922). He had met Nancy shortly before the collapse of his relationship with actress Leonora Corbett. They had two sons.

== War service ==
In the Second World War, Bernays joined the British Army as a sapper in 1942 and was commissioned as a subaltern into the Movement Control Section of the Royal Engineers in January 1943; according to Who's Who he was promoted to Captain in 1944, although his casualty record with the Commonwealth War Graves Commission, by whom he is commemorated on the Cassino Memorial in Italy, lists his rank as Lieutenant. After he died in a plane crash in the Adriatic Sea in January 1945, while flying from Italy to Greece as part of a parliamentary delegation to visit British troops, no by-election was called, and the Bristol North seat remained vacant until the 1945 general election, when it was won by the Labour candidate William Coldrick.

== Bibliography ==
- Naked Fakir (Victor Gollancz Ltd, 1931)
- Special Correspondent (1934)

Parliament of the United Kingdom
Preceded by Walter Ayles	Member of Parliament for Bristol North; 1931–1945	Succeeded by William Coldrick
Political offices
Preceded by Robert Hudson	Parliamentary Secretary to the Ministry of Health; 1937–1939	Succeeded by Florence Horsbrugh
Preceded by Austin Hudson	Parliamentary Secretary to the Ministry of Transport; 1939–1940	Succeeded by Frederick Montague
