= Isaac Bernays =

German rabbi (1792–1849)

Ḥakham Isaac Bernays
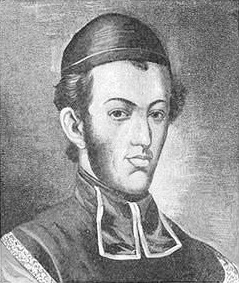

Personal life
- Born: 29 September 1792 Weisenau, Electorate of Mainz, Holy Roman Empire
- Died: 1 May 1849 (aged 56) Hamburg, Holy Roman Empire

Religious life
- Religion: Judaism

Isaac Bernays (/bɜːrˈneɪz/ bur-NAYZ; German: [bɛʁˈnaɪs]; 29 September 1792 – 1 May 1849) was Chief Rabbi in Hamburg.

== Life ==
Bernays was born in Weisenau (now part of Mainz). He was the son of Jacob Gera, a boarding housekeeper at Mainz, and an elder brother of Adolphus Bernays. After having finished his studies at the University of Würzburg, in which city he had been also a disciple of the Talmudist Rabbi Abraham Bing, he went to Munich as private tutor in the house of Herr von Hirsch and afterward lived at Mainz as a private scholar. In 1821, he was elected chief rabbi of the German-Jewish community in Hamburg, to fill a position where a man of strictly Orthodox views but of modern education was wanted as head of the congregation. After personal negotiations with Lazarus Riesser, who went to see him in Mainz, Bernays accepted the office on characteristic terms; namely, that all the religious and educational institutions of the community were to be placed under his personal direction; he wanted to be responsible to the government only. Besides this he required a fixed salary, independent of incidental revenues. The community assigned to him the title "clerical functionary" or "Ḥakham," instead of the usual traditional titles, "moreh tzedek" or "rabbi".

In 1822, he began the reform of the Talmud Torah school, where the poorer children of the community had until then been taught Hebrew and arithmetic. He added lessons in German, natural science, geography, and history as important parts of the curriculum, and by 1827 what had formerly been merely a religious class had been changed to a good elementary public school. The council of the community wanted to take a greater part in the supervision of the course of instruction, and in consequence of differences with the Chakam resulting from these claims, they withdrew the subvention of the school in 1830; but through the intervention of the senate of Hamburg this was again granted in 1832, though Bernays was denied the presidential seat he had till then occupied in the council of the school and was made instead "ephorus" of the school. In 1849, he died suddenly of apoplexy and was buried in the Grindel cemetery.

== Influence ==
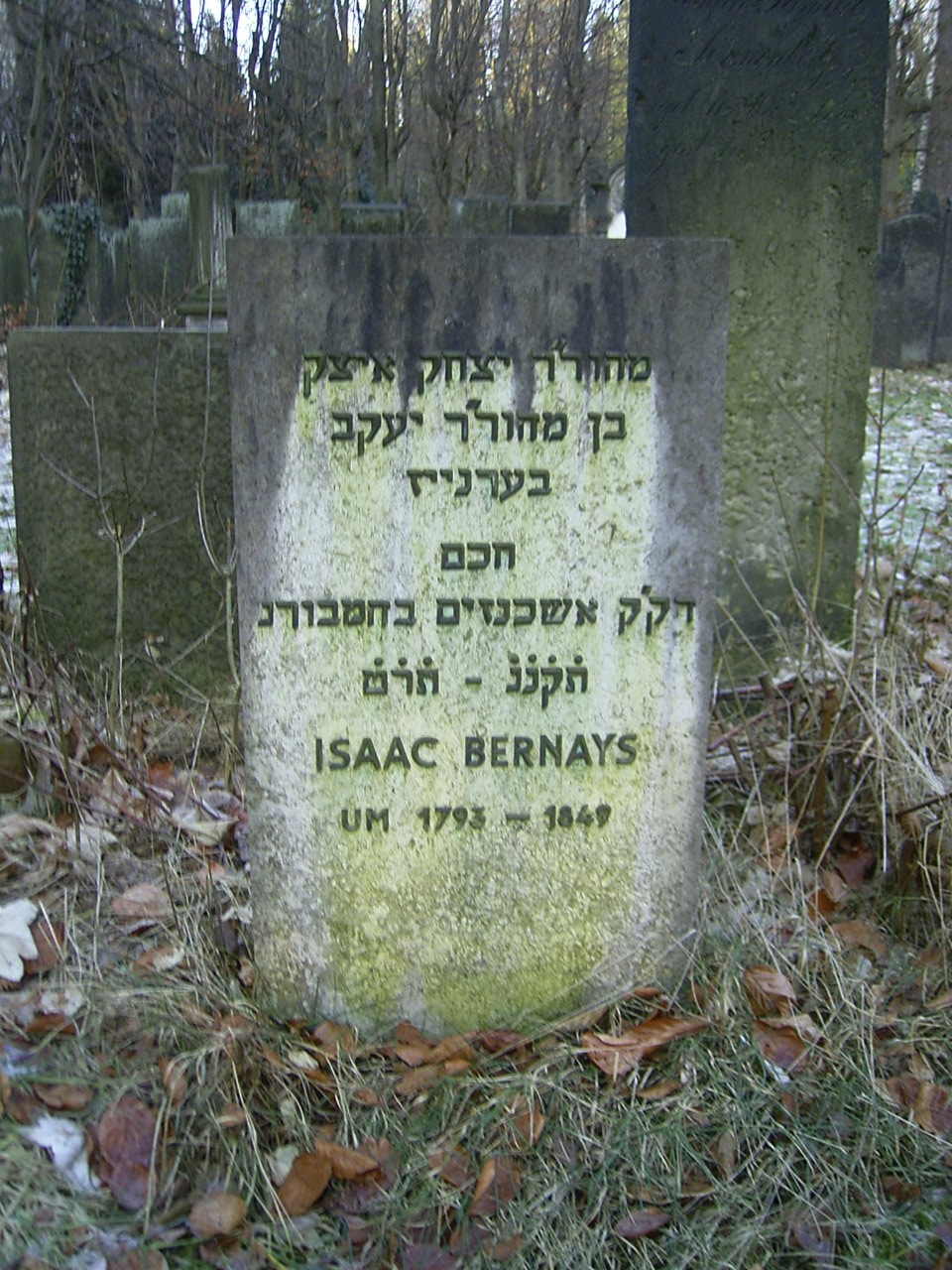

Bernays possessed wide philosophical views, a rare knowledge of the Bible, Midrash, and Talmud, and an admirable flow of language: he was indeed a born orator. He was the first Orthodox German rabbi who introduced the German sermon into the service, and who tried to interpret the old Jewish feeling in modern form and to preserve the ancestral creed even in cultured circles. His antagonists were therefore to be found in the ranks of the "mainstream" ultra-Orthodoxy as well as among the radical Reformers of the Hamburg Temple, the Reform synagogue founded in 1819, against whose new prayer-book Bernays had pronounced an anathema in 1841. By lectures on the Psalms, on Judah ha-Levi's Kuzari etc., he tried to strengthen and to deepen the religious life of the community, the institutions of which he supervised very carefully. His influence was felt in the Hamburg community, where Jewish traditions and the study of Jewish literature are often found united with modern education.

Bernays left no literary works. A small anonymous essay, "Der Bibelsche Orient"—of great linguistic learning and original and wide historical views on Judaism—was supposed to have been written by him in early years; but he denied the authorship, and never in later life showed any conformity with the views of the little book.

Bernays' best known pupil was Samson Raphael Hirsch, the founder of neo-Orthodoxy.

== Family ==
Of his sons, the philologist Jacob Bernays, professor and chief librarian at the University of Bonn, kept faithful to the religious views of his father, while the literary historian Michael Bernays, who was only fourteen years old on his father's death, was converted to Christianity. One of his sons, Louis Bernays is mentioned in the annals of the Jewish Community of Baden, Switzerland, as one of its ten founders in the year 1859.

Bernays' son Berman (1826–1879), who was also faithful to the religious views of his father, raised his daughter Martha Bernays (1861–1951) in the Jewish faith, but she later joined her husband Sigmund Freud in his religious antipathy. In her late years, she returned to the Jewish tradition.

A grandson of the Freuds was painter Lucian Freud, who married Kathleen Epstein, the natural daughter of sculptor Sir Jacob Epstein. A brother of Lucian was Clement Freud, the father of Emma Freud and Matthew Freud.

Edward Bernays, one of the founders of modern public relations, was his great-grandson.

== See also ==
- Bernays family
- Freud family
