= Lewis Adolphus Bernays =

Australian public servant (1831–1908)

Lewis Adolphus Bernays CMG
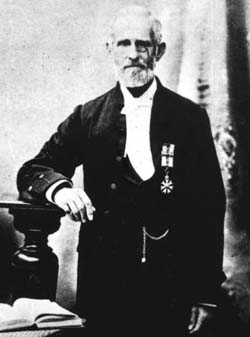
- Born: 3 May 1831; London, UK
- Died: 22 August 1908 (aged 77)
- Burial place: Toowong Cemetery
- Education: King's College London
- Occupations: Public servant, agricultural writer
- Parent(s): Adolphus Bernays; Martha Arrowsmith
- Relatives: Isaac Bernays (paternal uncle)

Lewis Adolphus Bernays (3 May 1831 – 22 August 1908) C.M.G., F.L.S., F.R.G.S, was a public servant, the first Clerk of the Queensland Legislative Assembly, and an agricultural writer in Queensland, Australia.

== Early life ==
Bernays was born in London. He was the son of the professor Adolphus Bernays and his wife Martha, née Arrowsmith. He attended King's College and then moved to New Zealand.

In 1851 he married Mary Anne Eliza, daughter of William Borton.

== Australia ==
Bernays went to Sydney in 1852 and began working at the New South Wales Parliament. In 1859 Sir George Bowen, the governor of Queensland had requested a clerk for the new Legislative Assembly of Queensland. Bernays became the Clerk of Parliament in 1860, a position that he held for over 47 years.

He published writing on agricultural economics, including The Olive and its Products in 1872 and Cultural Industries for Queensland; Papers on the Cultivation of Useful Plants Suited to the Climate of Queensland in 1883.

His son Charles Arrowsmith Bernays wrote about his father: 'On his death he was fittingly described by J. T. Bell as being of the best and rarest type of public servant'.

== Affiliations ==
Bernays was on the committee of the Johnsonian Club in 1880, its second year of existence.

He founded the Queensland Acclimatisation Society, holding positions of Councillor, Honorary Secretary, Vice-President, President and vice-patron for many years.

Bernays was also a Fellow of the Linnean Society of London., and a member of the Royal Geographical Society of Australasia (Queensland Branch).

== Later life ==
Bernays died of heart failure on 22 August 1908 following a short illness and was survived by five sons and four daughters. Bernays is buried in Toowong Cemetery.

== Legacy ==
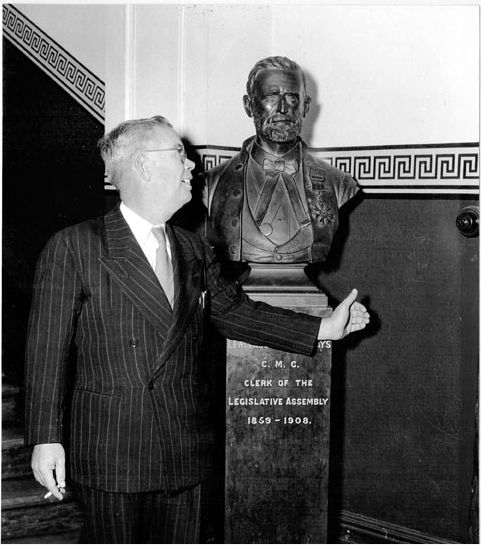
Bust of Lewis Adolphus Bernays CMG, Clerk of the Legislative Assembly 1859 to 1908, at the Opening of Queensland Parliament, 1953

In 1909, a bust of Bernays was commissioned from sculptor James Laurence Watts for the Queensland Parliament House.
