= HMS E24 =

Submarine of the Royal Navy

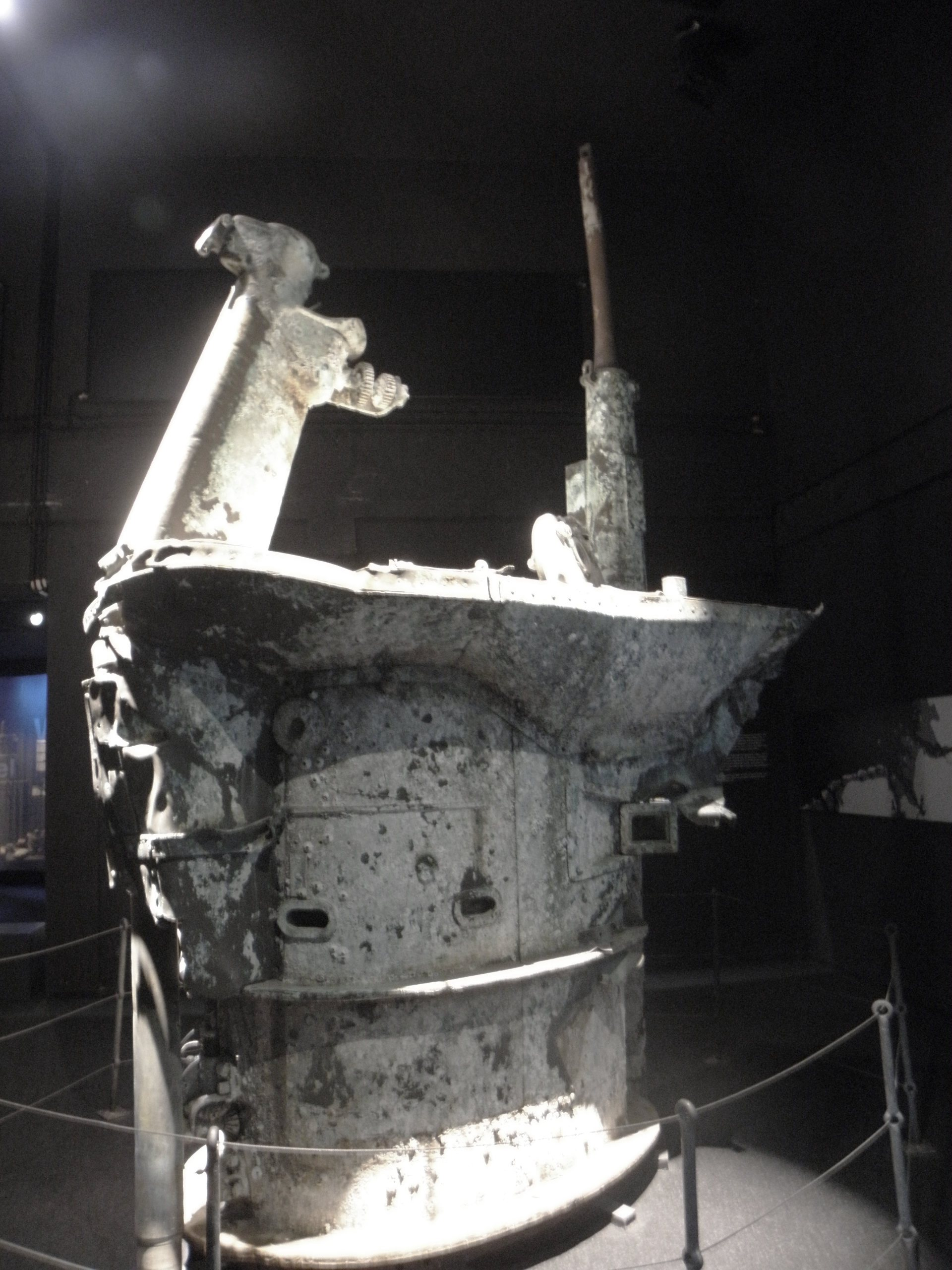
- The conning tower of E24

History

United Kingdom
- Name: E24
- Builder: Vickers, Barrow-in-Furness
- Launched: 9 December 1915
- Commissioned: 9 January 1916
- Fate: Sunk by mine on or about 24 March 1916

General characteristics
- Class & type: E-class submarine
- Displacement: 662 long tons (673 t) surfaced; 807 long tons (820 t) submerged
- Length: 181 ft (55 m)
- Beam: 15.05 ft (4.59 m)
- Propulsion: Twin-shaft; 2 × 800 hp Vickers diesel; 2 × 420 hp electric motors; 2 × screws
- Speed: 15 knots (28 km/h; 17 mph) surfaced; 10 knots (19 km/h; 12 mph) submerged
- Range: 3,000 nmi (5,600 km) at 10 kn (19 km/h; 12 mph) surfaced; 65 nmi (120 km) at 5 kn (9.3 km/h; 5.8 mph) submerged
- Complement: 31
- Armament: 5 × 18 inch (450 mm) torpedo tubes (2 bow, 2 beam, 1 stern); 1 × 12-pounder gun

HMS E24 was an E-class submarine of the Royal Navy built by Vickers, Barrow-in-Furness. She was launched on 9 December 1915 and was commissioned on 9 January 1916. E24 was a mine-laying submarine.

E24 was mined off Heligoland Bight on 24 March 1916. A salvage operation was attempted in 1973 as she was believed to be a German U-boat.

== Design ==
Like all post-E8 British E-class submarines, E24 had a displacement of 662 long tons (673 t) at the surface and 807 long tons (820 t) while submerged. She had a total length of 180 feet (55 m) and a beam of 22 feet 8.5 inches (6.922 m). She was powered by two 800 horsepower (600 kW) Vickers eight-cylinder two-stroke diesel engines and two 420 horsepower (310 kW) electric motors. The submarine had a maximum surface speed of 16 knots (30 km/h; 18 mph) and a submerged speed of 10 knots (19 km/h; 12 mph). British E-class submarines had fuel capacities of 50 long tons (51 t) of diesel and ranges of 3,255 miles (5,238 km; 2,829 nmi) when travelling at 10 knots (19 km/h; 12 mph). E24 was capable of operating submerged for five hours when travelling at 5 knots (9.3 km/h; 5.8 mph).

E24 was armed with a 2-pounder deck gun, mounted forward of the conning tower. She had five 18 inch (450 mm) torpedo tubes, two in the bow, one either side amidships, and one in the stern; a total of 10 torpedoes were carried.

E-Class submarines had wireless systems with 1 kilowatt (1.3 hp) power ratings; in some submarines, these were later upgraded to 3 kilowatts (4.0 hp) systems by removing a midship torpedo tube. Their maximum design depth was 100 feet (30 m) although in service some reached depths of below 200 feet (61 m). Some submarines contained Fessenden oscillator systems.

== Crew ==
Her complement was three officers and 28 men.

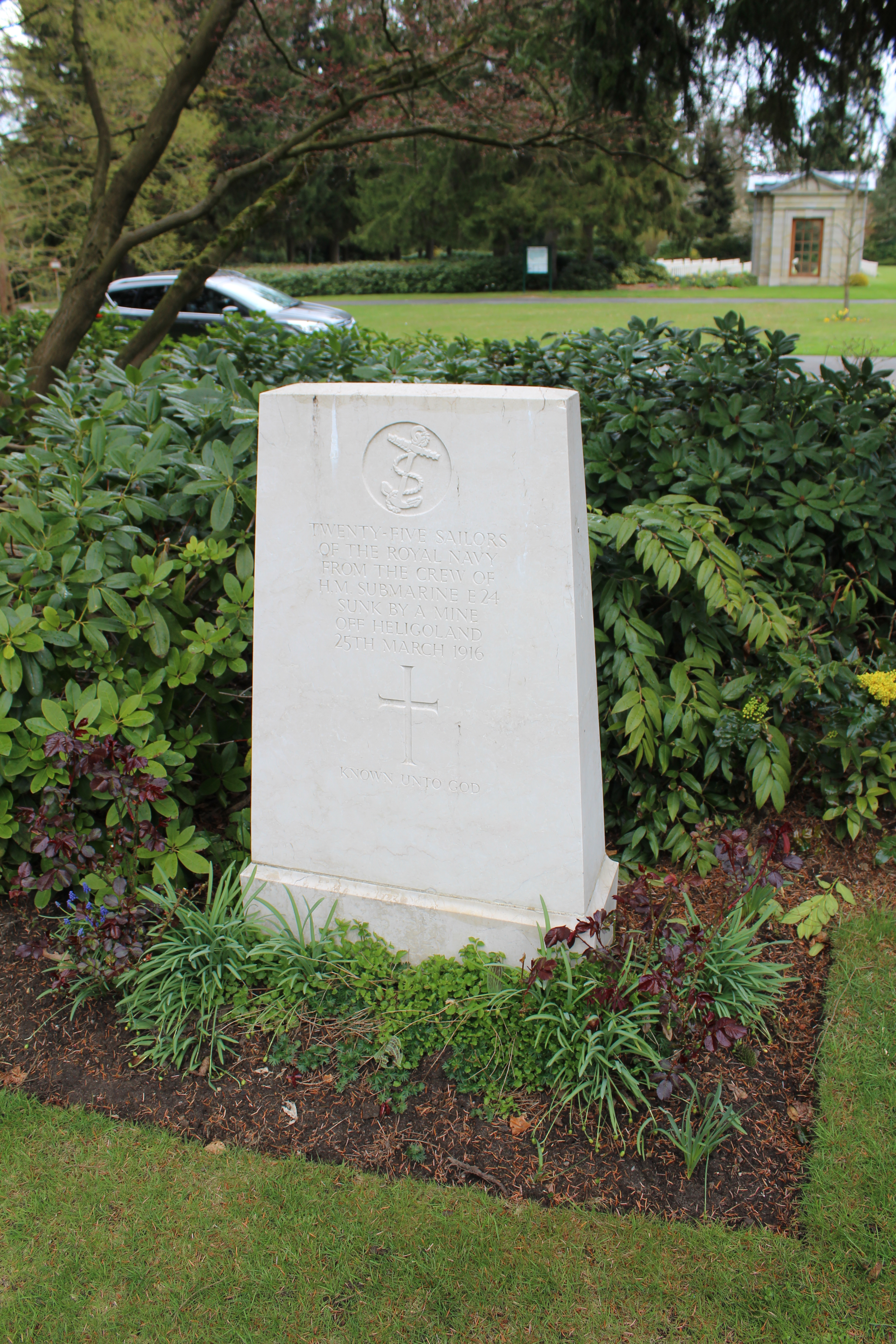
Monument to the crew of E24 at Hamburg Commonwealth War Graves Commission Cemetery

== Loss ==
E24 belonged to the Harwich-based 9th Flotilla at the time of her loss. She was the second E-class boat to be converted into a minelayer. E24 left Harwich on the morning of 21 March 1916 to lay mines in the Heligoland Bight. A positional report was issued late that night. Her commander, Lieutenant-Commander George W.E. Naper, was ordered to enter the Bight in darkness on the surface via the Amrum Bank. Once in position he was to lay mines in a zigzag formation. As mines were known to have been laid by the Germans off Ameland, Naper was ordered to return by the same route. She did not return from the mission, and was logged as missing on 24 March 1916.

== Salvage ==
Divers hunting for a Second World War-era U-boat in 1973 raised sections of a mined submarine wreck, including the conning tower. The boat was towed to Cuxhaven where the wreck was identified as a British E-class boat, rather than a German submarine. The German government then informed the Admiralty.

Human remains found in the wreck are buried in Ohlsdorf Cemetery, Hamburg.E24's commander is buried in a separate grave to others. Lieutenant-Commander Naper was identified because of the 2+half rings on sleeve, and the fact that his skeleton was 6 ft tall. All the skulls of those in the boat were found in a pyramidal formation. The sunken wreck lay at a downward angle, causing the heads to become detached from the bodies and to roll down the slope into that position. Three bodies were found lying under the battery boards directly on top of the batteries, with arms folded. They may have died of the effects of chlorine gas before the rest of the crew. Artefacts from E24 and her crew, such as smoking pipes belonging to Naper, a bottle of blackberries, the sextant, a firing pistol and boots are on display at Cuxhaven, as are the submarine's conning tower and propellers.
