= Gabriel Riesser =

German politician (1806–1863)

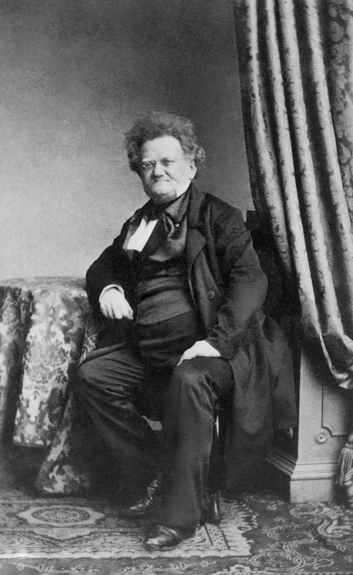
- Gabriel Riesser, c. 1856
- Born: 2 April 1806; Hamburg, Germany
- Died: 22 April 1863 (aged 57); Hamburg, Germany
- Occupations: Lawyer, judge

Gabriel Riesser (2 April 1806 – 22 April 1863) was a German politician and lawyer.

== Life ==
Both of Riesser's grandfathers were rabbis; his paternal grandfather was Jakob Pinchas Katzenellenbogen, rabbi in Lemberg, and later Oettingen, and his maternal grandfather was Raphael Cohen, Chief Rabbi of Altona-Hamburg-Wandsbek from 1775. Yet his father Lazarus Jacob Riesser, having changed the family name from Katzenellenbogen to Riesser, chose to work as a secretary at the Jewish law court of Altona before he finally became a merchant in Hamburg. After his education at the renowned grammar school Johanneum, Gabriel Riesser went to Heidelberg and Kiel, where he studied law from 1824 to 1828, writing his doctorate dissertation in Heidelberg. He became a leading advocate of Jewish emancipation. He had himself suffered discrimination because of his religion: in Heidelberg and Jena he was denied the position of a university lecturer, in Hamburg in 1829 he was not allowed to practice as a lawyer. In his application he had recurred to a privilege of equal treatment that had been granted during the French occupation. His application, however, was refused because he was not formally a citizen (which he as a Jew could not become) of the city of Hamburg.

In reaction, Riesser in 1830 published an essay "Stellung der Bekenner des mosaischen Glaubens in Deutschland" (On the Position of Confessors of the Jewish Faith in Germany). In 1832 he founded the journal Der Jude, periodische Blätter für Religions- und Gewissensfreiheit (The Jew, Periodical for Freedom of Religion and Thought). He also wrote a note on the emancipation of Jews for the parliament of the German state Baden in 1833. From 1836 onwards, he composed the "Jüdische Briefe" (Jewish Letters) in Bockenheim near Frankfurt am Main, which were subsequently published in Berlin in 1840–42.

Riesser was chairman of the Hamburg Temple Association from 1840–43.

In 1840 the Senate of Hamburg (city-state government) passed a law stating that "künftighin auch ein oder zwei Mitglieder der hiesigen israelitischen Gemeinde, wenn sie sonst dazu qualifiziert wären, Notare werden könnten" (in future also one or two members of the local Jewish community might become notaries, if they otherwise were duly qualified). This change of mind of the senate was brought about by the death of the Jewish notary Meyer Israel Bresselau, who had been installed during French annexation in 1811. Riesser applied for the vacant position. From 1840 to 1857 he practised as a notary in Hamburg.

== Politics ==
In 1848, Riesser was a member of the revolutionary Frankfurt Parliament where he was vice-president. He was elected for the constituency of Saxe-Lauenburg. Riesser was a member of the Kaiserdeputation which offered the Prussian King Frederich William IV the German crown.

== Legacy ==
When the civil rights of the "Paulskirchenverfassung" (Constitution of St. Paul's Church) came into effect in Hamburg on 21 February 1849, Riesser was able to become a citizen of Hamburg, a rare and dear franchise at that time, which the bulk of the inhabitants did not hold. In 1859, he was elected to the Bürgerschaft of Hamburg (city-state parliament). In October 1860, he was appointed as a member of the city's new upper court (Obergericht), becoming the first Jewish judge in Germany. In 1861, Isaac Wolffson, Riesser's colleague and fellow advocate for Jewish emancipation, was elected president of the Hamburg parliament, becoming the first Jewish president of a German parliament.

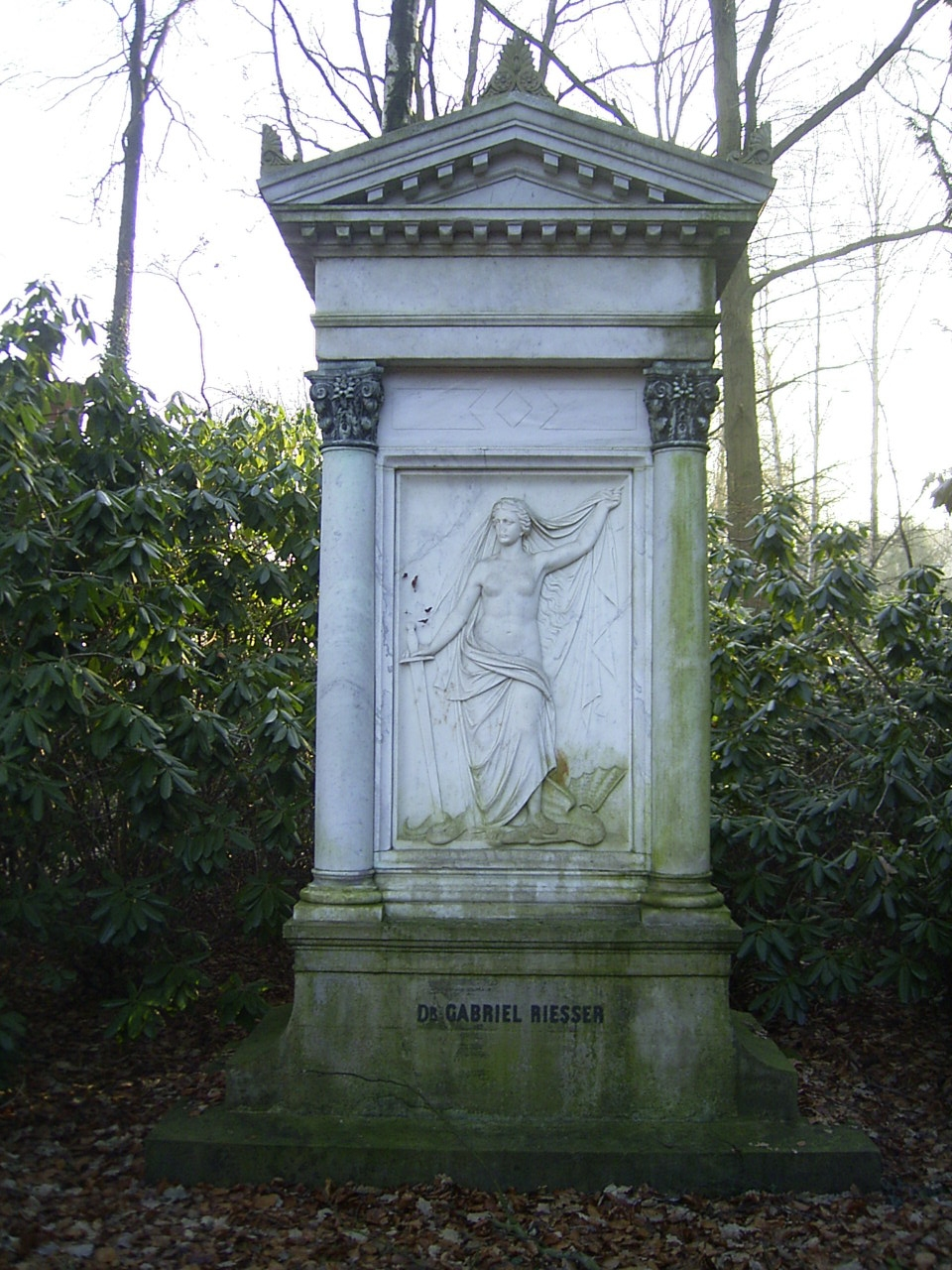
Riesser's grave at the Ohlsdorf Jewish Cemetery in Hamburg

Riesser was buried at the Jewish Grindel cemetery in Hamburg. When the Nazis ordered its demolition in 1937, the Ashkenazi Congregation transferred the graves, including his, to the Jewish section of Ohlsdorf Cemetery in Hamburg.

There is a street named after Riesser In Hamburg-Hamm.
