= Christian Graf von Krockow =

German writer and political scientist

Christian Graf von Krockow (26 May 1927 – 17 March 2002) was a German writer and political scientist.

Count Christian von Krockow was born in Rumbske (Rumsko) near the city of Stolp (Słupsk), Poland, the scion of a historic Pomeranian noble family. In 1945, as the Red Army advanced into the Province of Pomerania, he became a refugee and fled to Hamburg.

Between 1947 and 1954, Krockow studied sociology, philosophy, and law at the universities of Göttingen, in Germany, where he earned his doctoral degree, and Durham, in England. Between 1961 and 1969 he was a professor of political science at the universities of Göttingen, Saarbrücken, and Frankfurt. Between 1970 and 1973, he served as a founding regent of the University of Oldenburg, which in 1995 named him an honorary professor. He was named professor emeritus by the University of Göttingen in 1981. After resigning from his tenured position, he moved to Nikolausberg near Göttingen, where he made a name and a living as an independent writer and speaker. He also worked as speechwriter and political advisor to Chancellor Helmut Schmidt and the Dutch royal family. Towards the end of his life, he moved to Hamburg, where he continued to publish books and articles, albeit living in near seclusion.

Krockow received several German literary prizes. His biographies of Frederick the Great, Kaiser Wilhelm II, and the resistance fighter Claus Schenk von Stauffenberg, who attempted to assassinate Hitler on 20 July 1944, won wide readership.

His book Stunde der Frauen (Hour of the Women), which he wrote with his sister Libussa Fritz-Krockow, describes her ordeal fleeing Pomerania in 1945. When Germany collapsed, it was the hour of the German women, who rebuilt Germany from its ruins. The book remained a national bestseller for almost a decade and ushered in a period in which Germans began to rethink the immediate post-war period and come to terms with the loss of Pomerania, East Prussia, and Silesia. The book was translated into Polish, French, English, and Japanese.

Krockow died on 13 March 2002 in Hamburg, aged 74. He was buried at Ohlsdorf cemetery in Ohlsdorf.

Of his native region, lost to Germany with the border changes of 1945 and the Expulsion of Germans after World War II, Krockow wrote:

What broke forth over the people of East Prussia, Silesia and Pomerania and cost them their homeland, was set in motion long before: It was the result of our own German madness.

— Christian Graf von Krockow: Die Reise nach Pommern: Bericht aus einem verschwiegenen Land.
Deutscher Taschenbuch Verlag, Munich, 1985. ISBN 3-421-06251-X. Page 215.

== Bibliography ==
- Begegnung mit Ostpreußen (Familiarity with East Prussia)
- Otto von Bismarck Biography (1997)
- Churchill Biography (1999)
- Hitler und seine Deutschen Biography & national history (2001)
- Der deutsche Niedergang. Ein Ausblick ins 21. Jahrhundert (The German Collapse: A view into the 21st Century) (1998)
- Die Elbreise (Journey on the Elbe)
- Erinnerungen (Memoirs)
- Fahrten durch die Mark Brandenburg (Travels through Brandenburg) (1991)
- Die Entscheidung. Eine Untersuchung über Ernst Jünger, Carl Schmitt, Martin Heidegger (1990)
- Die Deutschen in ihrem Jahrhundert (The Germans in this Century) (1989)
- Die Stunde der Frauen (The Hour of the Women) (1988)
- Die preußischen Brüder (The Prussian Brothers)
- Die Reise nach Pommern (Journey to Pomerania) (1985)
- Die Rheinreise (Journey on the Rhine)
- Rheinsberg
- Vom lohnenden Leben (On Worthwhile Life)
- Über die Deutschen (On the Germans)
