= John Shepherd (RAF officer) =

British flying ace of WWII

- Born: 20 July 1919; Edinburgh, Scotland
- Died: 22 January 1946 (aged 26); Lübeck, Germany
- Burial place: Hamburg Commonwealth War Graves Commission Cemetery, Germany
- Military career
- Allegiance: United Kingdom
- Branch: Royal Air Force
- Service years: 1939–1946
- Rank: Squadron Leader
- Commands: No. 41 Squadron; No. 610 Squadron
- Conflicts: Second World War: Battle of Britain; Circus offensive; Dieppe Raid; Operation Diver
- Awards: Distinguished Flying Cross & Two Bars

John Shepherd, DFC & Two Bars (20 July 1919 – 22 January 1946) was a British flying ace who served with the Royal Air Force (RAF) during the Second World War. He was credited with having shot down at least thirteen aircraft as well as seven V-1 flying bombs.

From Edinburgh, Shepherd was served as ground crew in the Royal Auxiliary Air Force before training as a pilot in April 1939. He was called up for service with the RAF just before the outbreak of the Second World War and in September 1940 was posted to No. 234 Squadron, serving with it during the final stages of the Battle of Britain. He achieved his first aerial victories during the Circus offensive of 1941. Early the following year, he was posted to No. 118 Squadron, serving with this unit for nearly two years before being rested, having been awarded the Distinguished Flying Cross twice during this time. He returned to operations with No. 610 Squadron in mid-1944, and over the next several weeks destroyed a number of V-1 flying bombs during Operation Diver. He briefly commanded the squadron until it was disbanded in March 1945. He was then appointed commander of No. 41 Squadron which he led until the end of the war. In the immediate postwar period he was awarded the DFC for the third time. Still commanding No. 41 Squadron, he was killed in a flying accident on 22 January 1946.

== Early life ==
John Bean Shepherd was born on 20 July 1919 in Edinburgh, Scotland. He joined the Royal Auxiliary Air Force in a ground crew role and served with No. 603 Squadron. When an opportunity came up to train as aircrew, he applied and was accepted in April 1939.

== Second World War ==
In late August 1939, just before the outbreak of the Second World War, Shepherd was called up for service with the Royal Air Force (RAF) and commenced further training. His flying training was at No. 11 Elementary & Reserve Flying Training School at Perth and from there, he went to No. 7 Operational Training Unit (OTU) at Hawarden to train on the Supermarine Spitfire fighter.

Shepherd was posted as a sergeant pilot to No. 234 Squadron, which operated Spitfires from Middle Wallop, in September 1940. Although part of No. 10 Group and therefore not directly involved in the Luftwaffe's campaign against London, the squadron had been involved in several major engagements during the Battle of Britain and had lost many of its pilots. Shortly after Shepherd's arrival, the squadron moved to St Eval for a period of duty at a lowered operational tempo, with fewer sorties.

=== Circus offensive ===
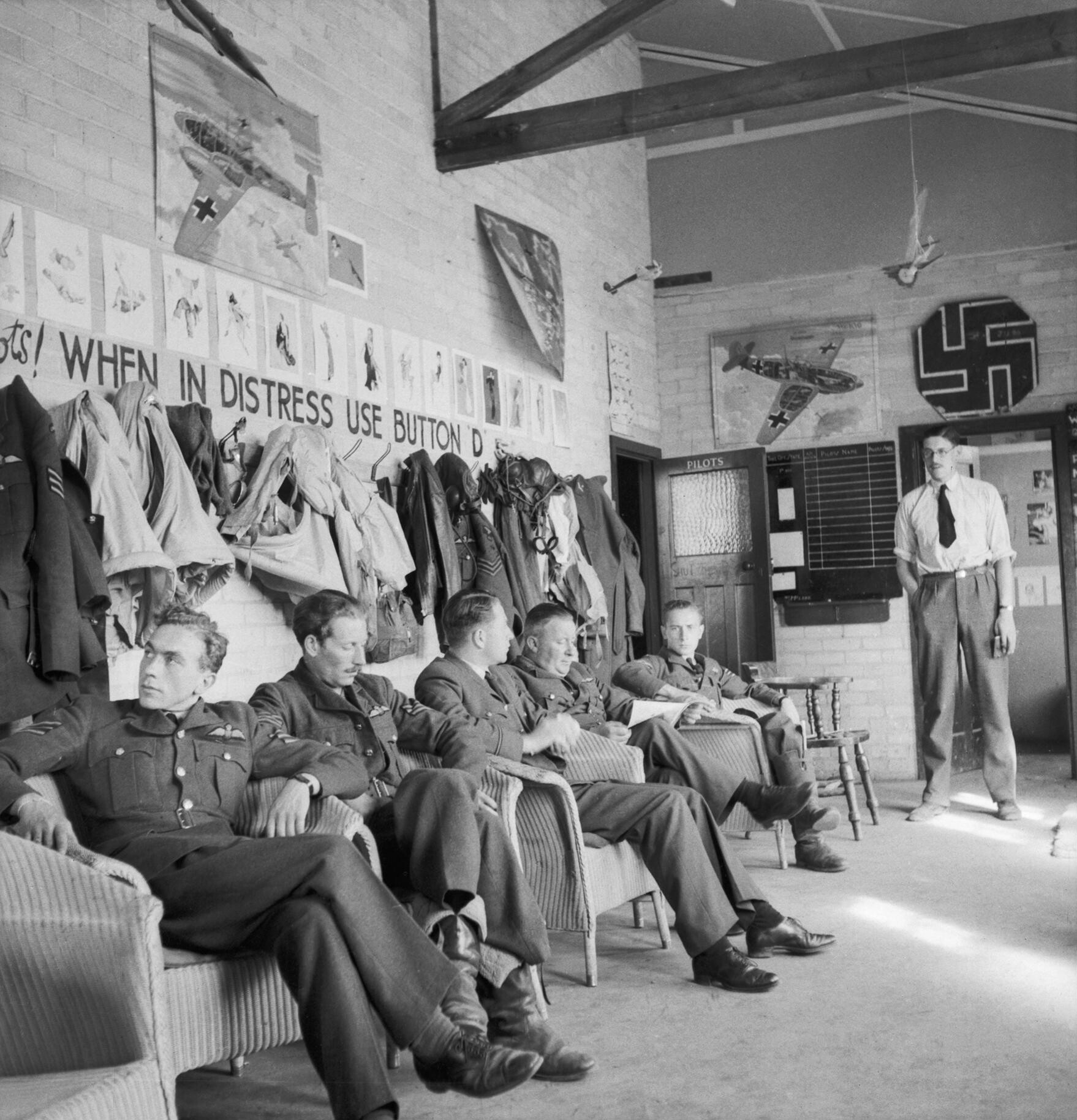
Pilots of No. 234 Squadron at Warmwell, July 1941

No. 234 Squadron moved to Warmwell in early 1941 and began to reequip with the Spitfire Mk II. It switched to an offensive role as part of the RAF's Circus offensive, flying on sorties and bomber escort duties to German-occupied France while also carrying out convoy patrols. On 23 March he and two other pilots shared in damaging a Junkers Ju 88 medium bomber over the Isle of Wight. He shared in the destruction of a Messerschmitt Bf 109 fighter to the northwest of Cherbourg on 17 June. He was credited with a half share in a Ju 88 that was probably destroyed over Veere on 12 August. Shortly afterwards he was commissioned as a pilot officer. He shot down one Bf 109 and damaged a second near Le Havre on 15 October.

In early 1942 Shepherd was transferred to No. 118 Squadron to serve as one of its flight commanders. This was stationed at Predannack and doing convoy patrols and offensive sweeps to France with its Spitfire Mk VBs. On 19 August, during the Dieppe Raid, he shared in the destruction of a Dornier Do 17 medium bomber over the English Channel. Two days later, his flying officer rank was confirmed on 21 August. The following month, he was recognised for his successes with an award of the Distinguished Flying Cross (DFC). The citation for the DFC was published in The London Gazette and read:

This officer has taken part in many sorties over enemy occupied territory and in several reconnaissance missions and attacks on shipping. He has destroyed at least two enemy aircraft. In the combined operations at Dieppe, Flight Lieutenant Shepherd assisted in the destruction of a Dornier 217. He has at all times displayed great skill and determination.

— London Gazette, No. 35712, 22 September 1942

Towards the end of 1942 and into 1943, No. 118 Squadron was regularly on bomber escort duties and often encountered Luftwaffe fighters. On 18 July, on a sortie to Holland, Shepherd destroyed two Bf 109s, one of which shared with another pilot. By this time, his acting rank of flight lieutenant had been made substantive. He damaged a Bf 109 near Schipol on 25 July and claimed another Bf 109 as probably destroyed on 2 August. Later that month, he was awarded a Bar to his DFC; the published citation read:

Since being awarded the Distinguished Flying Cross, this officer has undertaken a large number of sorties and has displayed inspiring leadership and great keenness throughout. He has participated in several successful attacks on enemy shipping and, in addition, has destroyed two enemy aircraft, bringing his victories to four. He has set a worthy example.

— London Gazette, No. 36148, 27 August 1943

=== Later war service ===
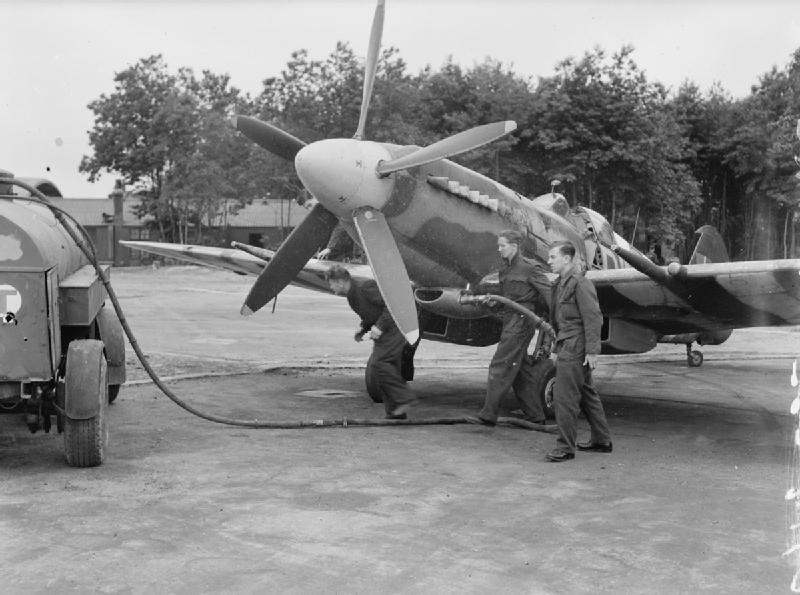
A Supermarine Spitfire Mk XIV fighter of No. 610 Squadron, used during its campaign against the V-1 flying bomb

In June 1944, Shepherd, who had been taken off operations for a rest the previous October, was posted to No. 610 Squadron. At this time, the squadron, being equipped with the fastest Spitfire model, the Mk XIV, was involved in Operation Diver, the RAF's campaign against the German-launched V-1 flying bombs and Shepherd destroyed seven of these over the south of England during the course of the next several weeks. Towards the end of the year, the squadron began flying sweeps to Germany. Early in 1945, the squadron went to Warmwell for armament exercises and at this time, Shepherd was appointed its acting commander. The squadron was disbanded in March and Shepherd was transferred to No. 41 Squadron.

Shepherd's new unit, equipped with Spitfire Mk XIVs, was stationed at Eindhoven from where it flew armed reconnaissances into Germany. Early the following month, Shepherd was appointed commander of the squadron. On 14 April, over Nordholz airfield in Germany, he engaged a Messerschmitt Bf 110 heavy fighter that was towing a jet fighter. He destroyed the Bf 110 and then engaged and shot down the jet fighter, a Messerschmitt Me 163. Two days later he destroyed a Focke Wulf 190 fighter over Hagenow. He shot down another Fw 190 to the north of Oranienburg, on 20 April, also sharing in the destruction of a second in the same vicinity. He shot down two aircraft, a Bf 109 and Fw 190 on 30 April. He claimed his last aerial victory, a Fw 190 that was shared with another pilot, the next day.

=== Postwar period ===
Later in May, No. 41 Squadron shifted to Denmark where it was based at Kastrup for two months before going to Lübeck in Germany, as part of the British Air Forces of Occupation. Shepherd was awarded a second Bar to the DFC on 14 September. On 22 January 1946, he was taking off in a Hawker Tempest fighter when it suffered an engine failure. The aircraft crashed into an anti-tank ditch beyond the airfield and Shepherd was killed on impact. Holding the rank of squadron leader at the time of his death, Shepherd is buried in Hamburg Commonwealth War Graves Commission Cemetery in Germany.

Shepherd is credited with having shot down thirteen aircraft, five of which shared with other pilots, as well as seven V-1 flying bombs. He claimed one aircraft as probably destroyed, with a second shared, and three damaged, one of which was shared.
