= Emil Naucke =

German professional wrestler

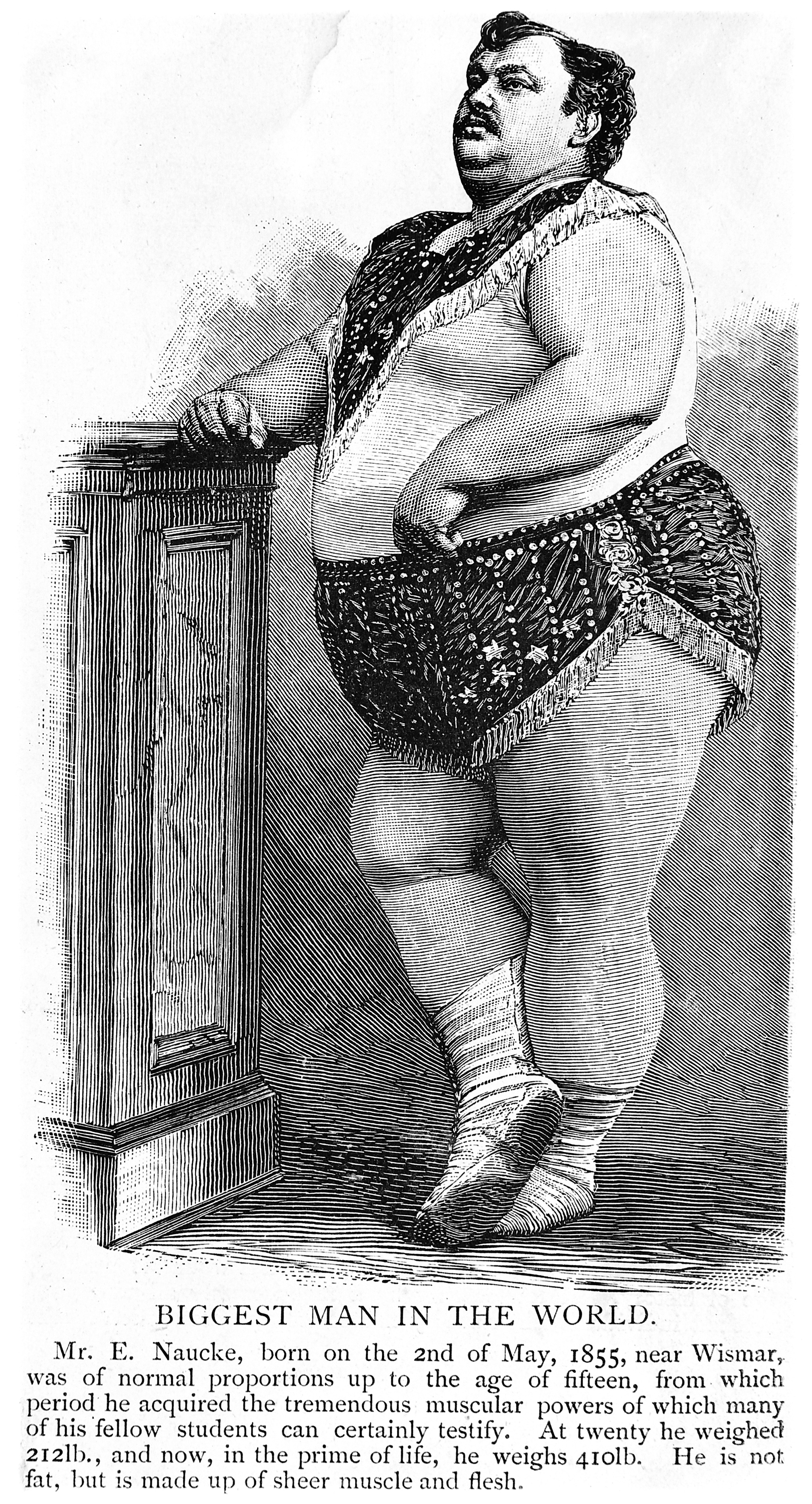

Personal information
- Born: May 22, 1855 Poel, Grand Duchy of Mecklenburg-Schwerin
- Died: January 24, 1900 (aged 44) Hamburg, Germany

Professional wrestling career
- Billed height: 170 cm (5 ft 7 in)
- Billed weight: 235 kg (518 lb)

Emil Naucke (May 2, 1855 – January 25, 1900) was a German professional wrestler and artist.

== Personal life ==
Naucke was born in Poel. Legend has it that he weighed 14 kilograms after just one month as a baby. Despite his high weight, he distinguished himself as a gymnast at a young age who liked to devote himself to tightrope walking. Naucke had originally started an apprenticeship as a baker, but at the age of 14 he joined a troupe of artists with whom he traveled through Europe and the USA. At the age of 18, he went to Hamburg, where he appeared in the St. Georg Theater and in various bars in Sankt Pauli.

He was successful in show business as a professional wrestler. Since his body weight increased steadily - at a height of only 1.70 m at the age of 38 years, he finally weighed 235 kilograms and had a waist circumference of 190 cm - he later gave up wrestling completely and, as a so-called colossal man, concentrated entirely on strength acrobatics, artistic performances and parodies.

In 1880, Naucke founded his own agency and appeared in numerous German and international cities such as Berlin, London, Paris, Madrid and Helsinki. As an extremely popular power man at the time, Emil Naucke performed in circuses and variety shows around the world. He presented sensational acts of strength, such as lifting a 106-kilogram iron weight and often carried an iron ball weighing almost 40 kilograms with him on a chain, with which he played effortlessly. He also performed cycling tricks and appeared in numerous skits written especially for him. One of his best-known comic roles was the figure of "Pauline from the ballet", in which he transformed into a ballerina, dressed in a ballerina's costume that appeared grotesque in the light of his size. As Naucke mit der Pauke ("Naucke with the kettledrum"), he became a by-word among Berliners.

In 1890, he settled in Hamburg, but was initially only present between his tours in the city. Every year he directed an extensive variety program at the Hamburg Winter Cathedral festival and at the Circus Rauterkrug in Lübeck. In his own appearances, he slipped into self-conceived burlesque roles such as that of "Pauline from the ballet". Despite his great weight, he showed an unusual agility and received a lot of applause. The small Paul Hansen, who was allegedly shorter than 1 meter, became his congenial partner in numerous comical appearances. The unequal couple presented themselves in the tradition of the freak show, for example performing tricks together on the bike.

In 1896, he opened his own variety theater called Emil Naucke's Varieté at Spielbudenplatz No. 23/24. Naucke became a popular figure in Hamburg in the following years.

== Death ==
On January 25, 1900, immediately after performing at a charity event at the Sagebiel establishment, Emil Naucke died of a heart attack. On the day of his funeral, thousands of people lined the path that the funeral procession took from his vaudeville to Ohlsdorf Cemetery, where he was buried. The memory of Emil Naucke's extraordinary appearance lived on indirectly until the 1970s: 70 years after his death, children in Hamburg still occasionally referred to a bulbous spinning-top or a big marble as a Naucke.
