= Lazarus Jacob Riesser =

German rabbi (1763–1828)

Lazarus Jacob Riesser (né Katzenellenbogen, Hebrew: אליעזר ליזר בן יעקב קצנאילנבוגן; 1763 – March 7, 1828) was a German rabbi. He was the father of Gabriel Riesser.

== Biography ==
Riesser was born in the valley of Riess, the son of Jacob Katzenellenbogen, rabbi of Öttingen-Wallerstein. Riesser was known for his great erudition in the Talmud and his keen intellect, which led to his being chosen as the son-in-law of Raphael Cohen, the incumbent of the rabbinate of Altona-Hamburg-Wandsbek. He resided in Altona and worked as the secretary to the beth din.

When Kohen resigned his post in 1799 due to disagreements with the Danish government, Riesser lost his office and moved to Hamburg with his father-in-law. There, he entered the business world but met with little success. In his spare time, he wrote his father-in-law's biography, titled Ma'alele Ish. This, along with two sermons by Raphael Cohen, was published under the title Zekher Tzaddik in Altona in 1805. In 1813, when Hamburg was blockaded by the Russians, Riesser moved to Lübeck. He returned to Hamburg in 1816.

Riesser's correspondence with his son Gabriel, consisting of 20 letters from May 7, 1824 to February 22, 1828, was published by Isler in Gabriel Riesser's Leben (pp. 36–61). The Heimann I. Michael collection in the Bodleian Library contains some of Riesser's manuscripts.
