= Ohlsdorf Jewish Cemetery =

Jewish cemetery in Hamburg

Coordinates: 53°36′52″N 10°02′22″E

Jüdischer Friedhof Ilandkoppel
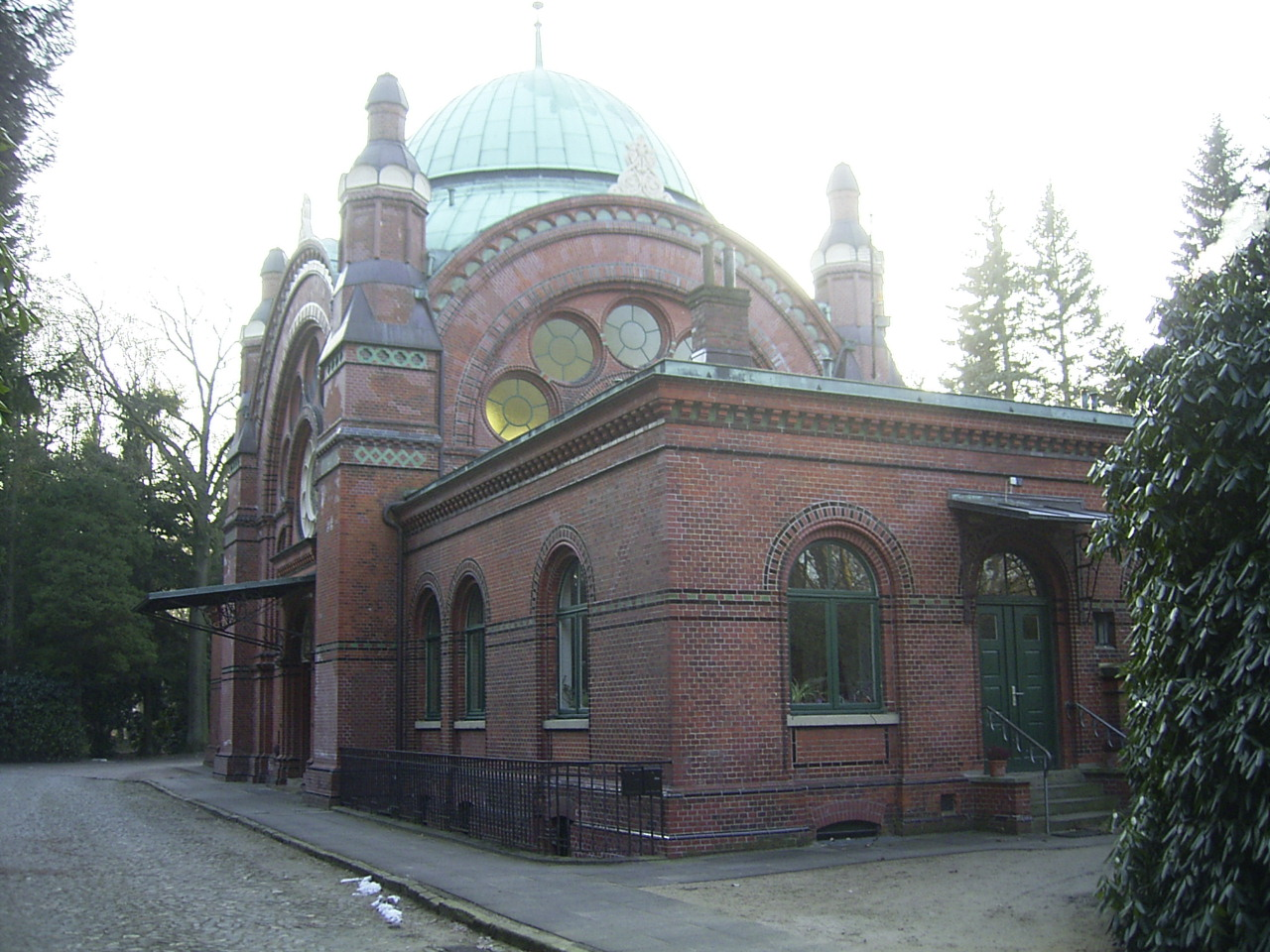
- Interactive map of Jüdischer Friedhof Ilandkoppel

Details
- Established: 1883
- Location: Ohlsdorf, Hamburg, Germany
- Type: Jewish cemetery
- Size: 11 ha
- No. of graves: 18,000
- Website: Official website

The Jewish cemetery Ohlsdorf (German: Jüdischer Friedhof Ohlsdorf or Jüdischer Friedhof Ilandkoppel) also known as Ilandkoppel Jewish Cemetery is a Jewish cemetery in the Ohlsdorf district of Hamburg, Germany. It is the only operating Jewish cemetery in Hamburg and still used for burials according to the Jewish ritual and tradition. It is adjacent to the large non-denominational Ohlsdorf Cemetery where more than 1.5 million people are buried.

== History and description ==
The Jewish Cemetery in Ohlsdorf was opened on 30 September 1883. The burial ground of the Sephardi Jews are rather special because of the remarkable and striking architectural elements. The Jews who had been expelled from Portugal and Spain around 1490 took their burial tradition along with them when immigrating to Hamburg: tombs, grave stones laying flat on the ground and stones in a sarcophagic style. In June 1937, the Jewish cemetery at the Grindelquarter was completely destroyed by the Nazis. Under the conduct of Rabbi Joseph Carlebach, 200 stones could be transferred to Ohlsdorf. A further 175 gravestones from the cemetery Ottensen were transferred in 1939 and 1941. Male visitors are requested to wear a head covering. Kippahs can be borrowed from the green box at the entrance gate and should be replaced when leaving the cemetery.

== Memorials for the victims of Nazism ==
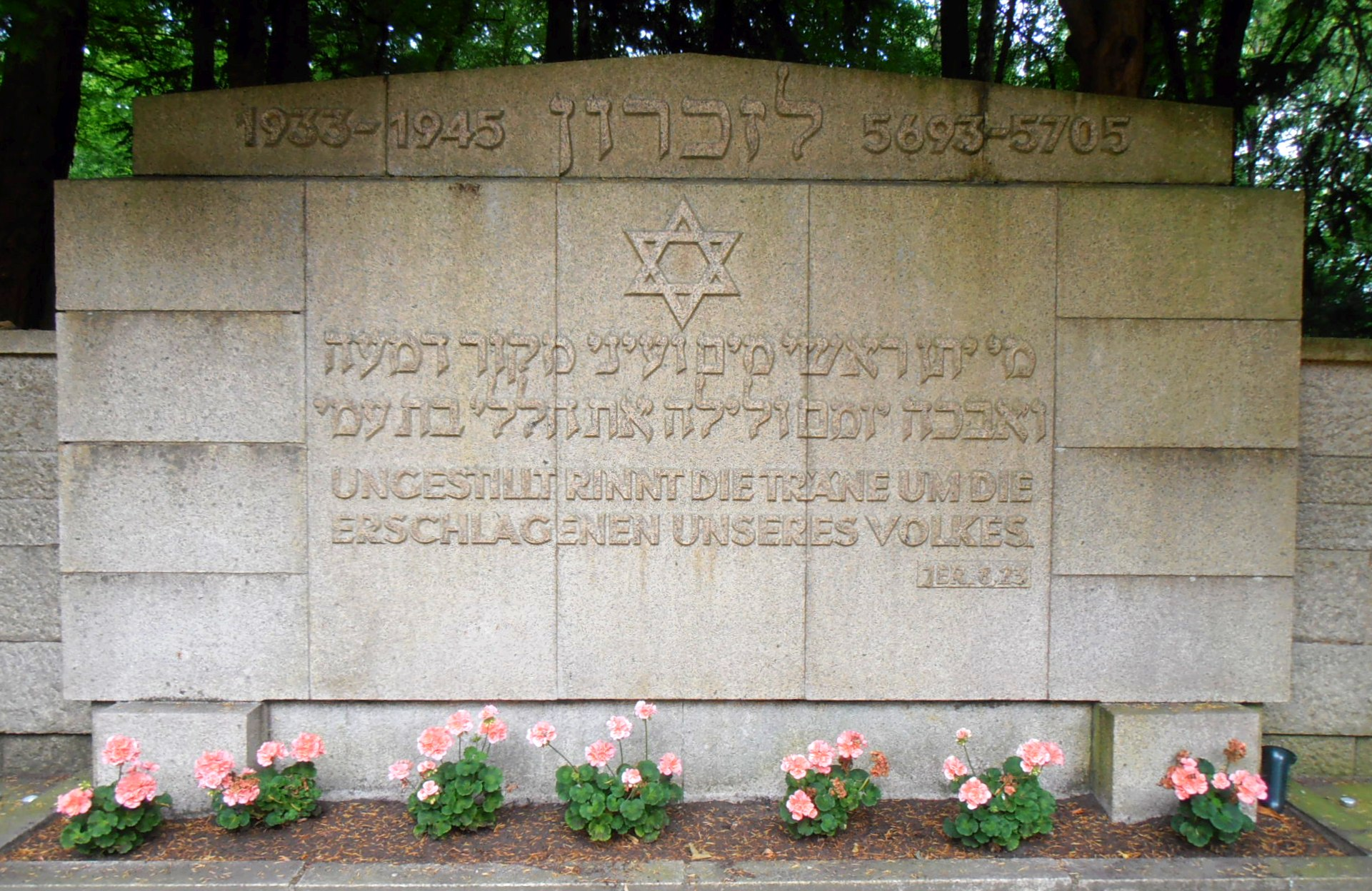
Shoah memorial

A memorial for the victims of The Holocaust opposite the ceremony hall commemorates the 190,000 German and over 5 million murdered European Jews. A single detached urn contains soil and ash from the Auschwitz concentration camp. The memorial wall behind shows the Star of David, dates and a quote from Jeremiah 8:23 "...that I might weep day and night for the slain of the daughter of my people".

== Selected notable burials ==
A few of the notables buried here are:

- Isaac Bernays (1792–1849), Chief rabbi of Hamburg
- Georg Hartog Gerson (1788–1844), Medical doctor and surgeon in the King's German Legion during the Napoleonic Wars
- Gabriel Riesser (1806–1863), Jewish German politician and lawyer

== See also ==
- Ohlsdorf Cemetery, nearby Friedhof Ohlsdorf

== Gallery ==
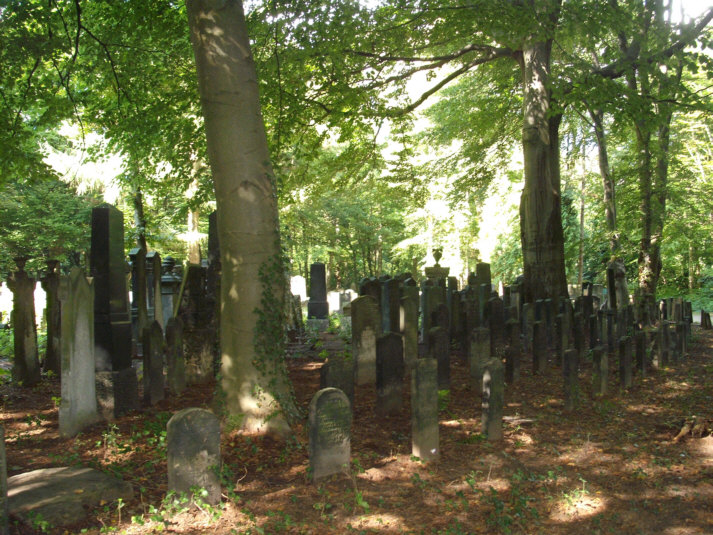

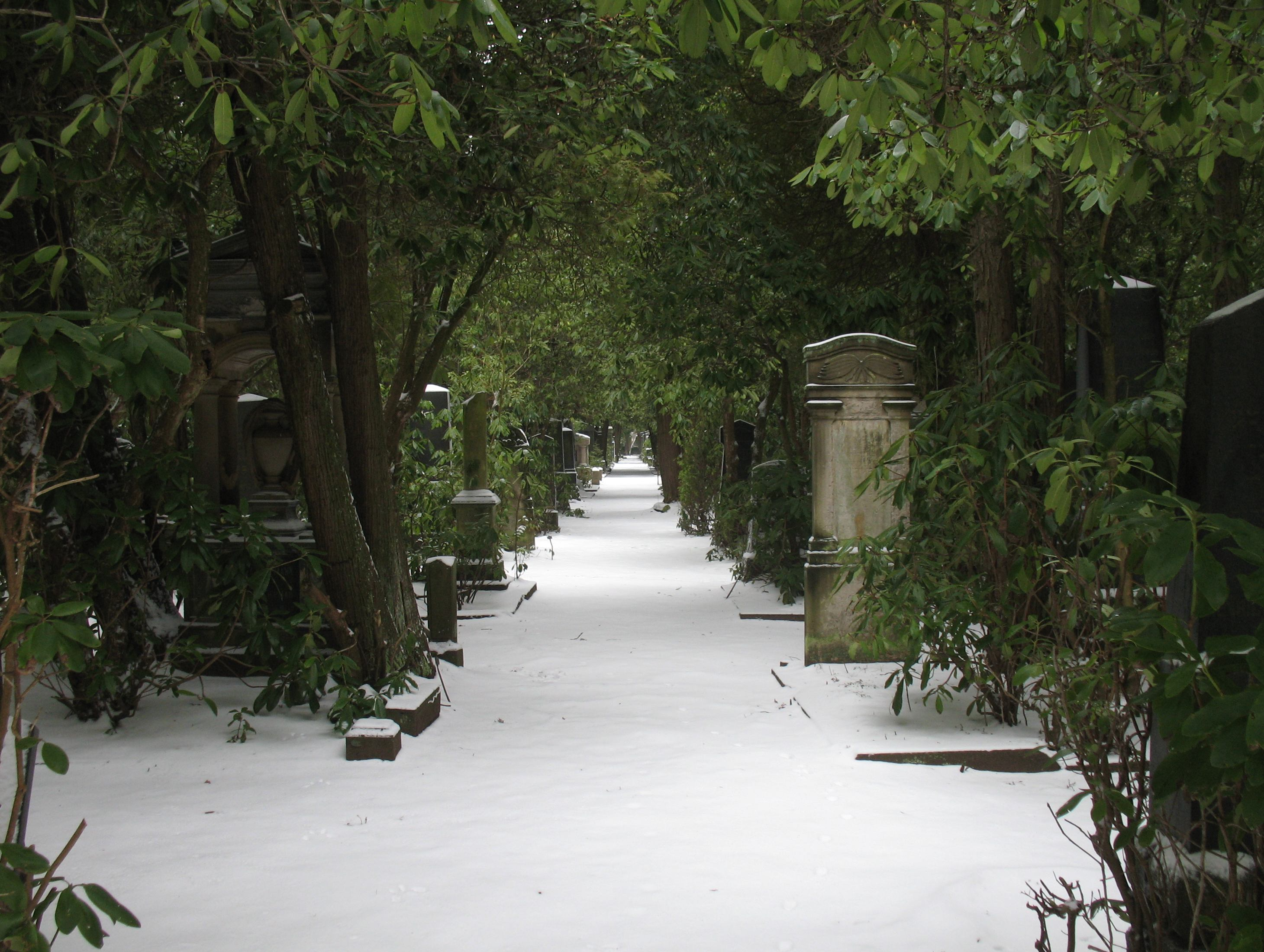

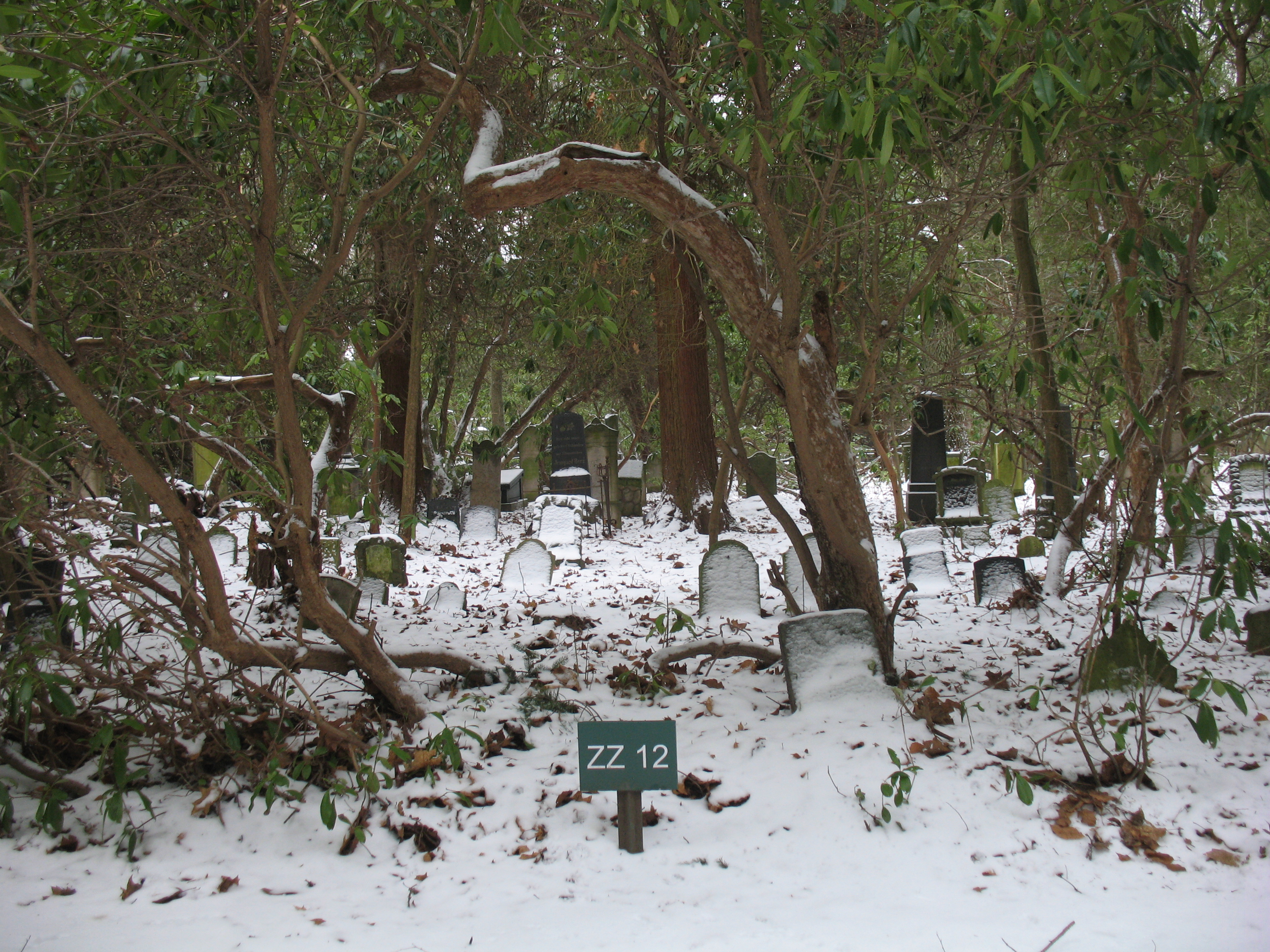

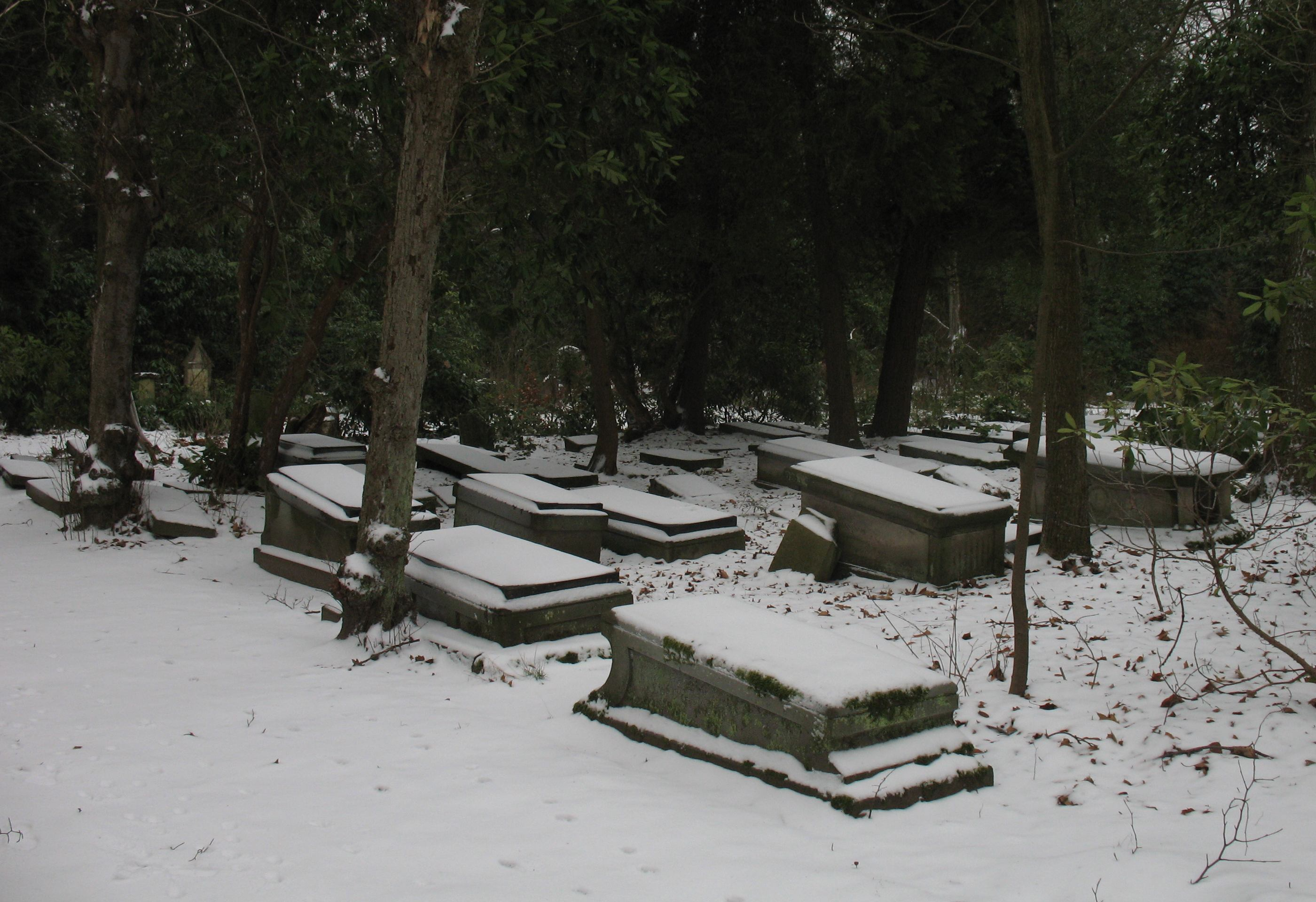

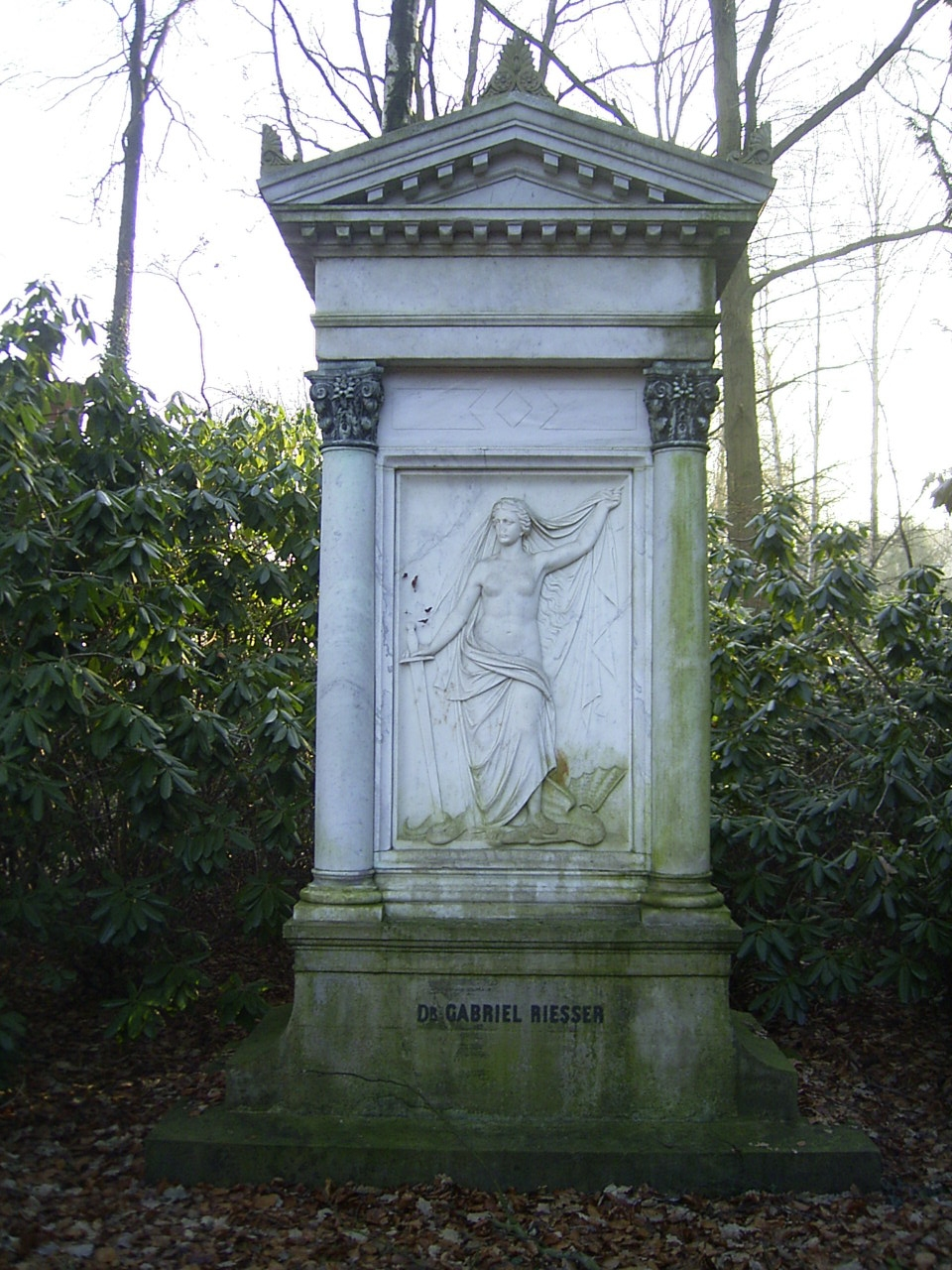

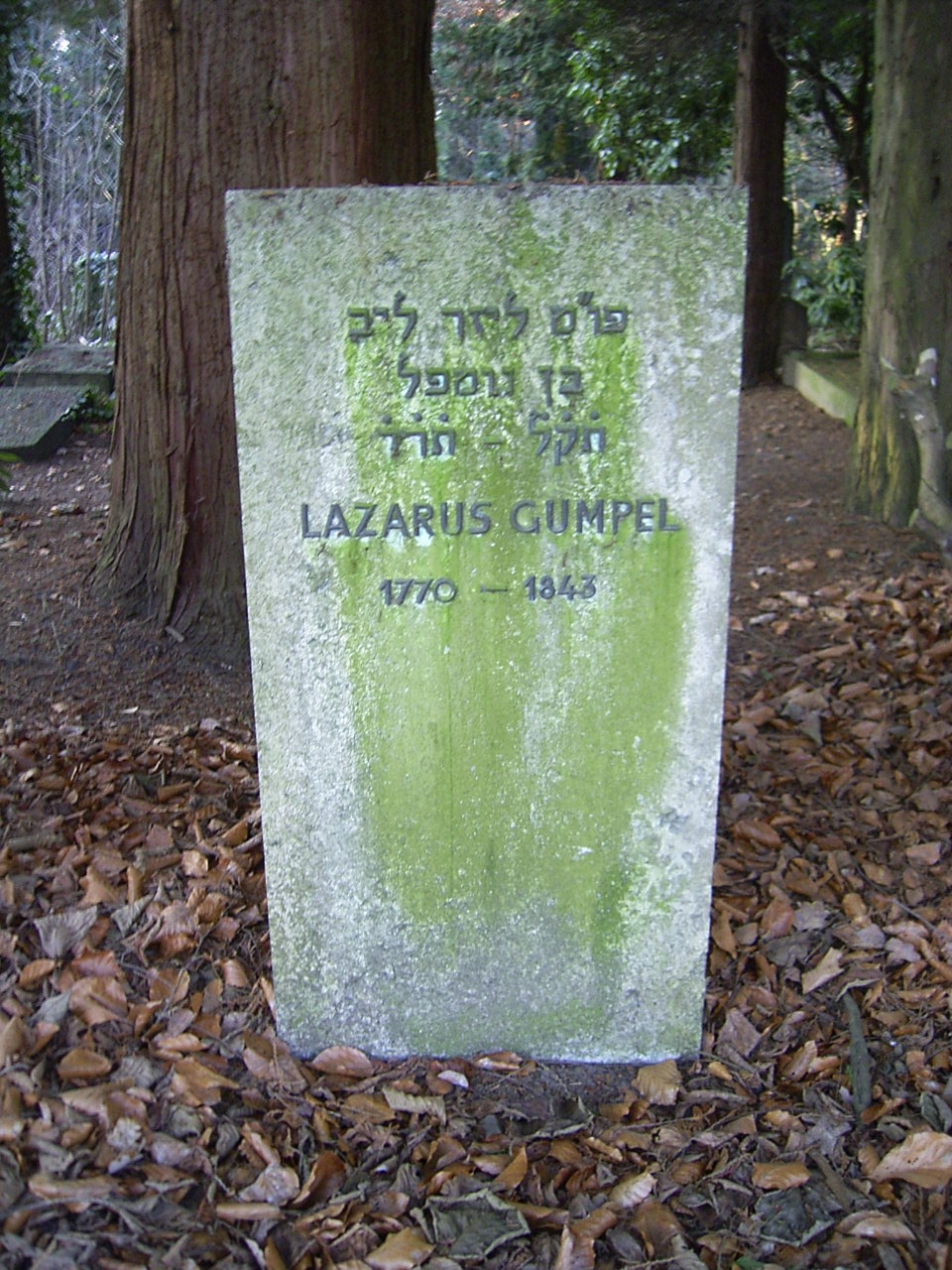

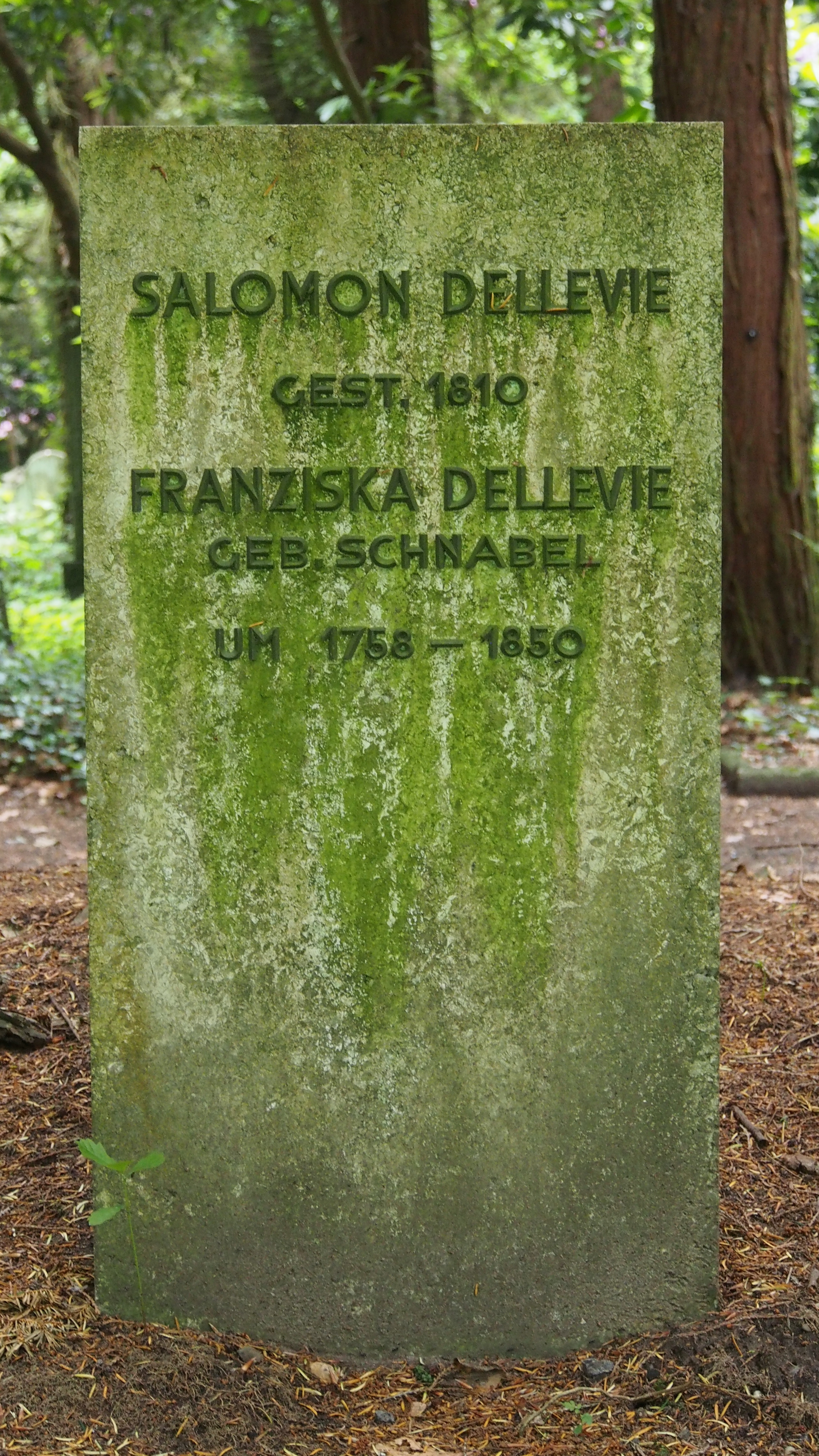
department Grindel cemetery / gravestone of the Jeweller family Dellevie

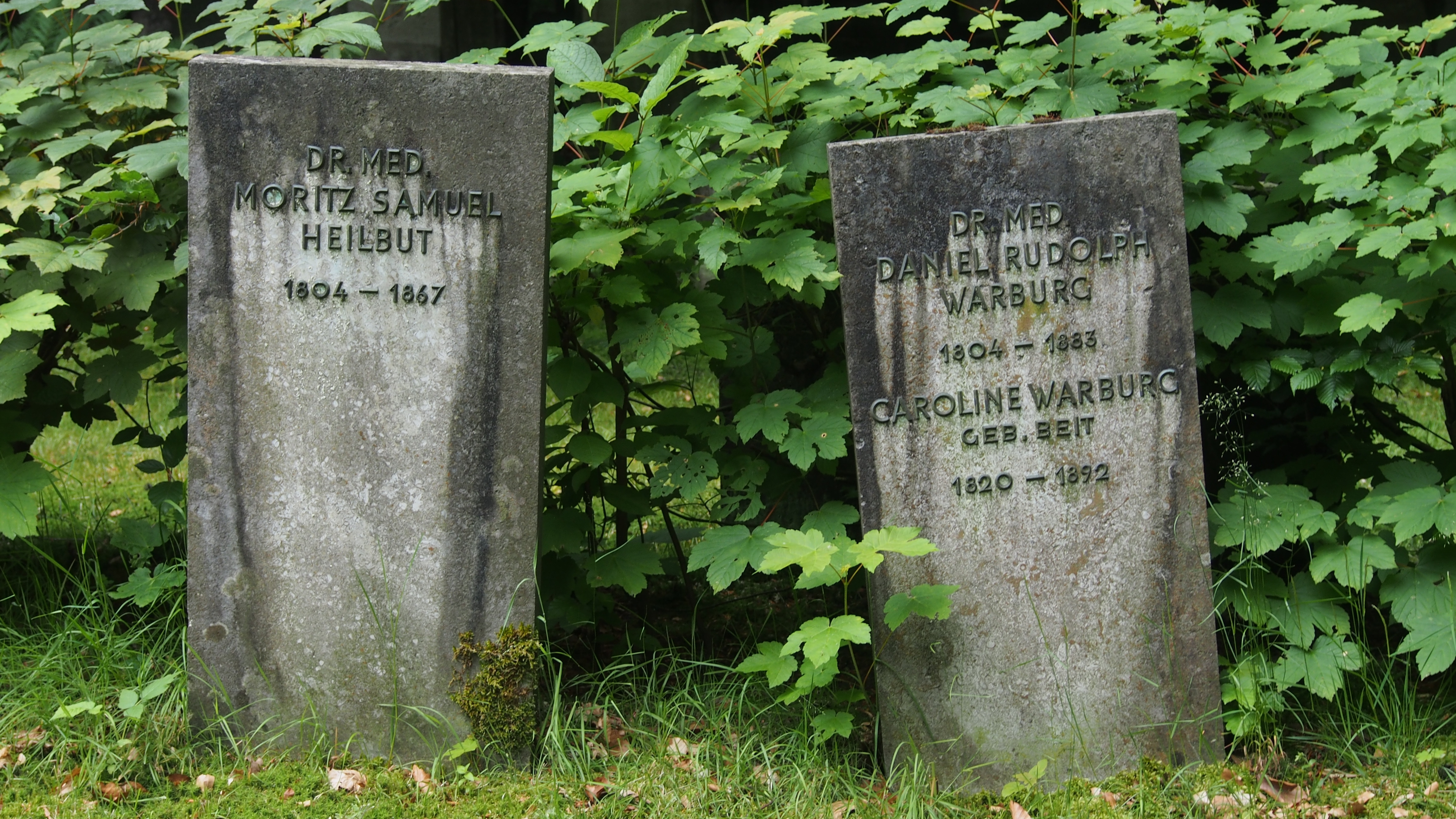
department Grindel cemetery / Moritz Samuel Heilbut and family Warburg

== Source and references ==
- Official website
