= Hamburg Commonwealth War Graves Commission Cemetery =

WWI & WWII CWGC cemetery in Germany

Coordinates: 53°37′20″N 10°04′01″E

Hamburg Commonwealth War Graves Commission Cemetery is a war cemetery which was built and is looked after by the Commonwealth War Graves Commission (CWGC). The war graves of 676 Commonwealth service personnel from World War I and 1,889 from World War II are located near Chapel 12 (German: Kapelle 12) in the greater Ohlsdorf Cemetery in the Ohlsdorf quarter of Hamburg.

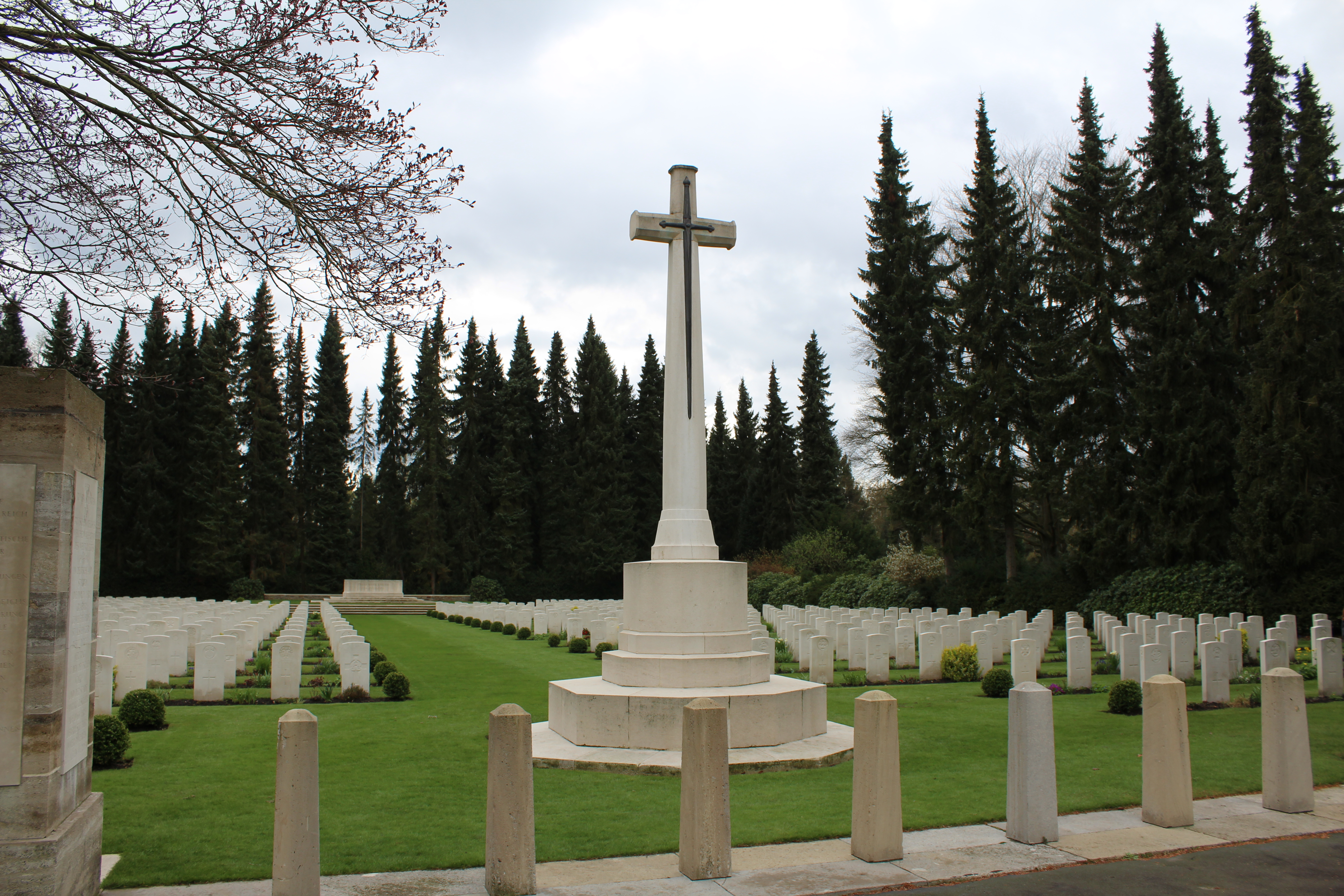
Hamburg Cemetery within Ohlsdorf Cemetery

== Graves of World War I ==
During World War I a part of Ohlsdorf cemetery was reserved to bury more than 300 soldiers of the Allied Forces who died as prisoners of war. In 1923 the CWGC decided to build four central war cemeteries for all servicemen of the Commonwealth nations who were killed in action and were otherwise victims of war. One, Friedhof Ohlsdorf (Ohlsdorf Cemetery) in Hamburg, incorporated from then on the Hamburg Commonwealth War Graves Commission Cemetery.

Later on, those killed in action as well as the other deceased persons were transferred from 120 provisional war cemeteries in the provinces of Schleswig-Holstein, Mecklenburg, Oldenburg, Hannover, Braunschweig, Saxony and Westfalen to bury them in the new installed cemetery.

In total 708 killed or deceased persons from World War I were buried here or mentioned on commemorative tables. In particular, three prisoners of war who died in Parchim and whose graves could not be identified are mentioned here. Twenty-five unidentified sailors, of the submarine HMS E24 sunk in 1916 in the neighbourhood of Helgoland, are also buried here, following recovery of the submarine in 1973. The German War Graves Commission (Volksbund Deutsche Kriegsgräberfürsorge) counts 676 buried Commonwealth soldiers of World War I.

== Graves of World War II and postwar ==
After World War II 1,466 soldiers of Commonwealth nations, who were Air Force crews who had been shot down, as well as part of occupying forces, were buried here. Several years later an additional 378 persons from Commonwealth nations were buried here. Also, 14 soldiers from other nations have their graves located here. The German War Graves Commission (Volksbund Deutsche Kriegsgräberfürsorge) counts 1,889 Commonwealth soldiers of World War II buried here. A list of names of the Commonwealth soldiers who fell in Second World War exists.

== Gravestones and gardening ==
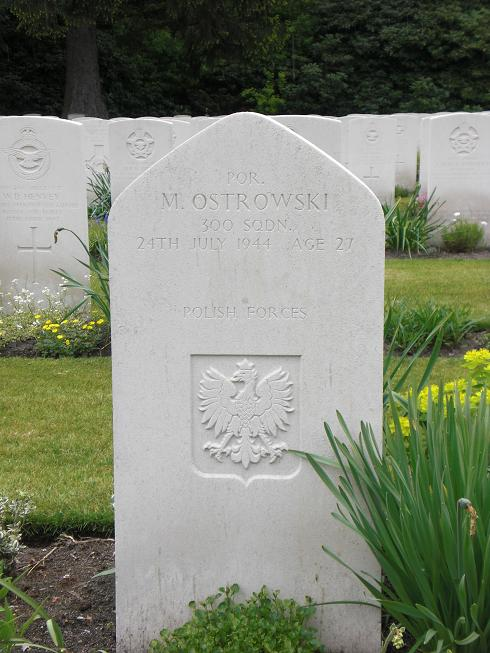
Grave of F/Lt (bomb.) Mieczysław Ostrowski (No. 300 Polish Bomber Squadron "Land of Masovia")

The structures and plantings in this war cemetery are in compliance with the CWGC standards. Looking out over the cemetery, numerous rows of graves are visible. In the background, there is a Hall of Remembrance as a landmark. This cemetery was designed by Robert Lorimer.

In direct view on an axis lies a Cross of Sacrifice, followed by the Stone of Remembrance with the inscription "Their Name Liveth For Evermore."

The white limestone gravestones show the emblem of the military unit, day of death, religion (if known), name and military rank and words of remembrance by relatives. In front of the individual graves are roses.

There is a visitors' book in one of the two pavilions.

== Notable interments ==
- Lieutenant-Colonel Neville Elliott-Cooper VC DSO MC (1889–1918), British World War I recipient of the Victoria Cross
- Squadron Leader John Shepherd, DFC and Bar (1919-1946), British flying ace of World War II
- Sergeant Pilot James Allen Ward VC (1919-1941), New Zealand World War II recipient of the Victoria Cross.
