= Robert Elliott-Cooper =

British civil engineer

Sir Robert Elliott-Cooper KCB VD
- Born: 29 January 1845; Leeds, Yorkshire, England
- Died: 16 February 1942 (aged 97); Knaphill, Surrey, England
- Engineering career
- Discipline: Civil
- Institutions: Institution of Civil Engineers (president)

Sir Robert Elliott-Cooper KCB VD (29 January 1845 – 16 February 1942) was a British civil engineer. He spent much of his career as a railway engineer with projects in his native Yorkshire, India and West Africa. Elliott-Cooper was members of the committees that developed British Standards for steel bridges and Portland Cement and also sat on many government committees. He had a long involvement with the British Army's Volunteer Force, serving as an officer in the 1st Yorkshire (West Riding) Artillery Volunteer Corps and later as a technical specialist and colonel he commanded the Engineer and Railway Staff Corps. During the First World War he served on the War Office Committee of Hutted Camps for which he was rewarded with appointment as Knight Commander of the Order of the Bath.

== Engineering career ==
Born in Leeds, Yorkshire, on 26 January 1845, he was the only son of Robert Cooper, a stockbroker, and his wife Louisa Lucretia Elliott, younger sister of General Sir William Henry Elliott. He received an education from Leeds Grammar School before entering into a pupillage with the civil engineer John Fraser for whom he acted as resident engineer on railway construction projects in Yorkshire until November 1874. On 30 May 1874 Elliott-Cooper applied for a patent for "improvements in apparatus for locking railway signals and switches, and for locking railway signals and gates at level crossings", this patent was granted provisional protection on 26 June 1874.

Between November 1874 and May 1875 Elliott-Cooper was in India inspecting engineering works. In June 1876 he established his own engineering consultancy in Westminster. One of his positions was as consultant to the Regents Canal and Dock Company. Elliott-Cooper was appointed a tax commissioner for the City of Westminster and its liberties on 9 August 1899. Elliott-Cooper became the Crown Agent Engineer for the construction of railways by the government in British West Africa on the death of Benjamin Baker in 1907, a position he held until 1916 and in which role he acted as arbitrator in railway disputes.

Elliott-Coope rwas elected president of the Institution of Civil Engineers (ICE) for the November 1912 to November 1913 session – he had been an associate member since 1870, a full member since 1876, member of the council since 1900 and vice-president from 1909. In October 1913 he held the institution's inaugural meeting in the newly built headquarters at One Great George Street, for which he had chaired the building committee. He was chairman of the Engineering Standards Association committee on steel bridges from 1911 to 1928 and a member of the British Standards committee which established standards for the use of Portland Cement in 1919. In 1912 he was appointed to the advisory board of the Science Museum, London, and in 1914 to the India Office Committee where he worked on appointments made to the Public Works Department and the Indian state railways. In 1914 he was also appointed to the general board of the National Physical Laboratory and of the London County Council Tribunal of Appeal (in relation to the Building Act). In 1916 he was a member of the Committee on the Deterioration of Structure Exposed to Sea Action and in 1919 on the government's Mining Sub-Committee.

Elliott-Cooper was elected president of the Smeatonian Society of Civil Engineers in 1923. In 1925 he served as technical advisor to the British Treasury in which role he supervised payments made to contractors under the Trades Facilities Act. In marking his 85th birthday in 1930 the journal Nature noted that he was "among the oldest of English engineers". He drew up the plans for the widening of Knowle Locks on the Warwick and Birmingham Canal in the 1930s. The ICE recognised his service with election as an honorary member on 22 February 1938.

== Volunteer military service ==
On 27 September 1870 he was commissioned into the 1st Yorkshire (West Riding) Artillery Volunteer Corps as a first lieutenant, a rank replaced by that of lieutenant during British Army standardisation in 1871. The 1st Yorkshire (West Riding) Artillery Volunteer Corps was a Volunteer Force coastal artillery unit formed at Leeds in 1860 and armed with 32-pounder guns. Elliott-Cooper was promoted to captain on 5 June 1875 and major on 16 April 1879. He resigned his commission as a major on 27 February 1886 and was permitted to retain his rank and continue to wear the uniform.

Elliott-Cooper later returned to the army by serving in the Engineer and Railway Staff Corps, an unpaid volunteer unit which provides technical expertise to the British Army. He was commissioned into this corps as a lieutenant colonel on 6 January 1900. He was awarded the Volunteer Officers' Decoration on 15 November 1904 in recognition of his twenty years service as a volunteer officer. Elliott-Cooper continued in the Engineer and Railway Staff Corps as a lieutenant colonel after that corps' transferral from the Volunteer Force to the newly formed Territorial Force on 1 April 1908. He was made Commandant of the corps on 27 July 1912 and promoted to the honorary rank of colonel. He resigned his commission with the corps on 21 March 1914 and was again permitted to retain his rank and wear the uniform. During the First World War he was chairman of the ICE War Office Committee and of the War Office Committee of Hutted Camps, a service for which he was rewarded with an appointment as Knight Commander of the Order of the Bath on 1 January 1919.

== Personal life and death ==
In 1878 at or near Christchurch, then in Hampshire, he married Fanny, daughter of William Leetham, and they had six children: Evelyn, Gilbert, Malcolm, Millicent, Vera and Neville. Fanny died at age 92 in 1948. Neville became a British Army lieutenant-colonel and was awarded the Victoria Cross, Distinguished Service Order and Military Cross. He died in German captivity of wounds received in action during the First World War.

Elliott-Cooper at one point lived at 44 Princes Gate in Knightsbridge. He died aged 97 on 16 February 1942 at Knapwood House, Knaphill, Surrey, and his will was proved on 8 June 1942 by his only surviving son and executor Malcolm, his effects being valued at 76,000 pounds which would be worth over 3.2 million pounds in 2015.

== Bibliography ==
- Greenacombe, John (2000), Survey of London: volume 45: Knightsbridge, English Heritage
- Watson, Garth (1988), The Civils, Thomas Telford Ltd, ISBN 978-0-7277-0392-7
- Watson, Garth (1989), The Smeatonians: The Society of Civil Engineers, London: Thomas Telford Ltd, ISBN 978-0-7277-1526-5

Professional and academic associations
Preceded by William Unwin	President of the Institution of Civil Engineers; November 1912 – November 1913	Succeeded by Anthony George Lyster
