= Rumsko =

- Village
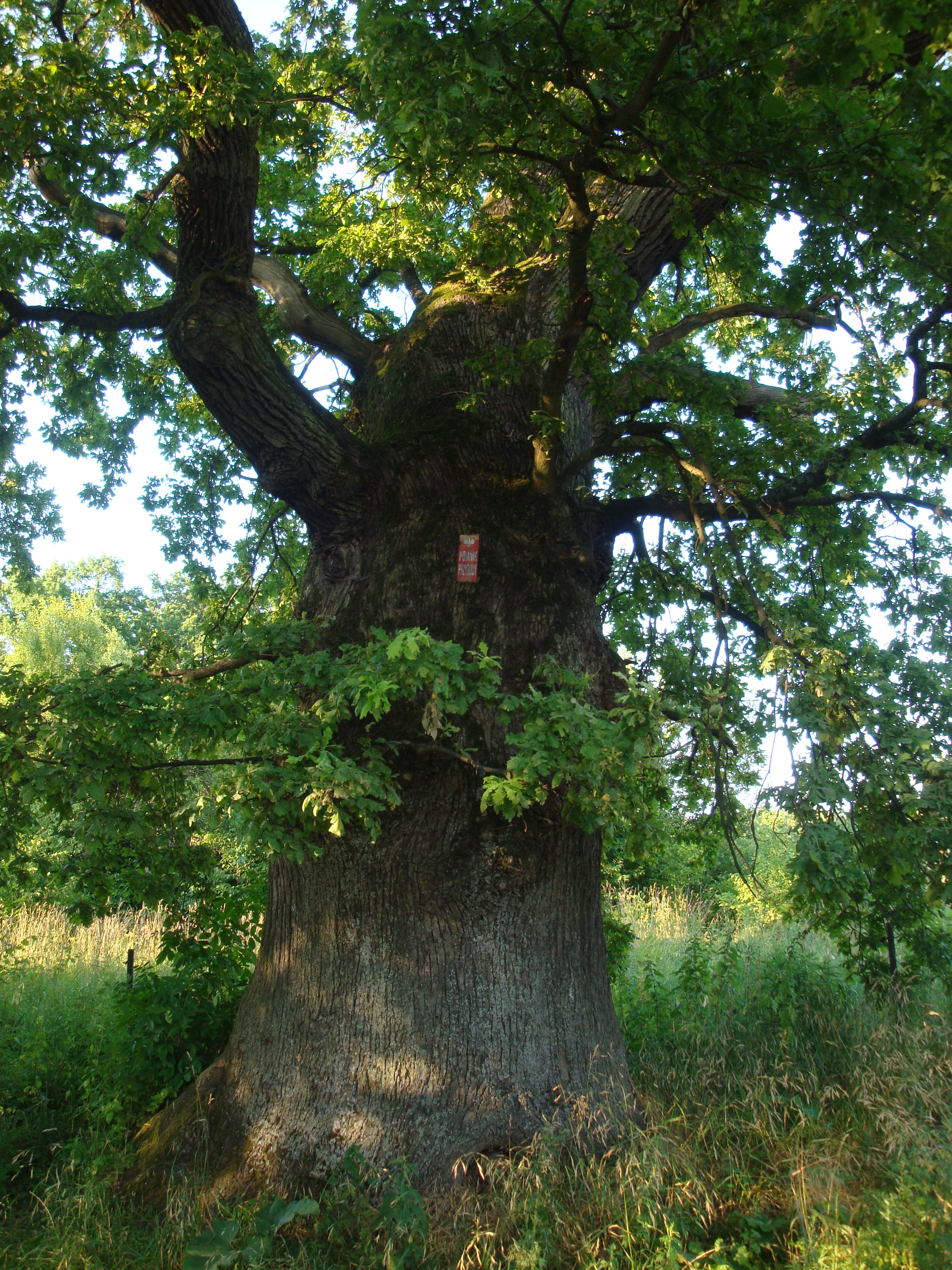
- Oak-nature monument

- Location within Poland
- Coordinates: 54°36′33″N 17°18′51″E
- Country: Poland
- Voivodeship: Pomeranian
- County: Słupsk
- Gmina: Główczyce

Population
  - Total: 300
- Postal code: 76-220
- Vehicle registration: GSL

Rumsko [ˈrumskɔ] (German: Rumbske) is a village in the administrative district of Gmina Główczyce, within Słupsk County, Pomeranian Voivodeship, in northern Poland. It is located in the historic region of Pomerania.

== History ==
In the 960s the area became part of the emerging state of Poland. After the fragmentation of Poland into smaller duchies, it was at various times part of the duchies of Pomerania (Western), Pomerania (Eastern) and Słupsk. In 1648 it passed to Brandenburg, then in 1701 to Prussia, and in 1871 to the German Empire. Historically, it was also known in Polish as Rumska. Following Germany's defeat in World War II in 1945, it became again part of Poland.

== Notable residents ==
- Christian Graf von Krockow (1927-2002), German author
