= Neville Elliott-Cooper =

Recipient of the Victoria Cross

Lieutenant-Colonel Neville Elliott-Cooper VC DSO MC
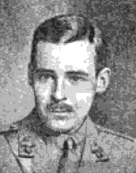
- Born: 22 January 1889; Lancaster Gate, London, England
- Died: 11 February 1918 (aged 29); Hannover, Germany
- Burial place: Hamburg Commonwealth War Graves Commission Cemetery, Germany
- Relatives: Sir Robert Elliott-Cooper (father)
- Military career
- Allegiance: United Kingdom
- Branch: British Army
- Service years: 1908–1918
- Rank: Lieutenant-Colonel
- Units: Royal Fusiliers
- Commands: 8th Battalion, Royal Fusiliers
- Conflicts: World War I
- Awards: Victoria Cross; Distinguished Service Order; Military Cross

Lieutenant-Colonel Neville Bowes Elliott-Cooper, VC, DSO, MC (22 January 1889 – 11 February 1918) was a British Army officer and an English recipient of the Victoria Cross (VC), the highest award for gallantry in the face of the enemy that can be awarded to British and Commonwealth forces.

== Early life ==
Elliott-Cooper was born on 22 January 1889 at 81 Lancaster Gate, London, the youngest son of Sir Robert Elliott-Cooper, a civil engineer and builder of railways, and his wife, Lady Fanny Elliott-Cooper (née Leetham). From 1901 until 1907 he was educated at Eton, becoming a member of the Eton College Volunteers. From here he moved on to attend the Royal Military College at Sandhurst. In October 1908, at the age of nineteen, he received a commission as a second lieutenant in the Royal Fusiliers of the British Army. In the years prior to the First World War he served with his regiment in such places as South Africa, Mauritius, and India.

When he was 28 years old, and a temporary lieutenant colonel commanding the 8th Battalion the Royal Fusiliers, British Army, he was awarded the Victoria Cross for his actions on 30 November 1917 east of La Vacquerie, near Cambrai, France, during the Battle of Cambrai.

== Citation ==
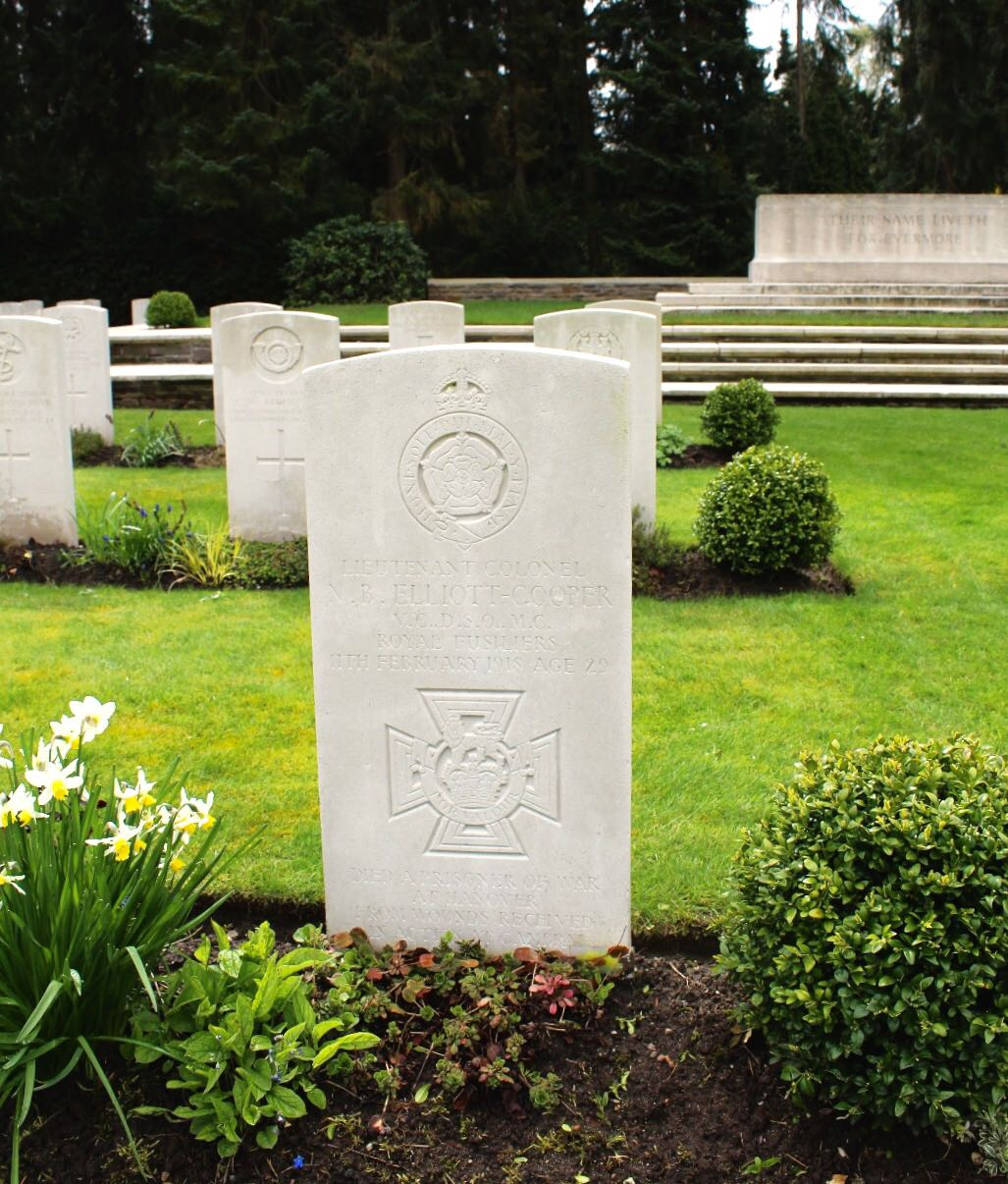
Elliott-Cooper's grave in Hamburg Commonwealth War Graves Commission Cemetery

For most conspicuous bravery and devotion to duty. Hearing that the enemy had broken through our outpost line, he rushed out of his dug-out, and on seeing them advancing across the open he mounted the parapet and dashed forward calling upon the Reserve Company and details of the Battalion Headquarters to follow. Absolutely unarmed, he made straight for the advancing enemy, and under his direction our men forced them back 600 yards. While still some forty yards in front he was severely wounded. Realising that his men were greatly outnumbered and suffering heavy casualties, he signalled to them to withdraw, regardless of the fact that he himself must be taken prisoner. By his prompt and gallant leading he gained time for the reserves to move up and occupy the line of defence.

— The London Gazette, 12 February 1918

He died of his wounds while a prisoner of war on 11 February 1918, aged twenty-nine, in Hannover, Germany.

His VC is displayed at the Royal Fusiliers Museum, Tower of London, England.

== Bibliography ==
- Gliddon, Gerald (2004). VCs of the First World War: Cambrai 1917. Sutton Publishing. ISBN 978-0-75-247668-1.
