= Ohlsdorf Cemetery =

Cemetery in Hamburg, Germany

Ohlsdorfer Friedhof Ohlsdorf cemetery
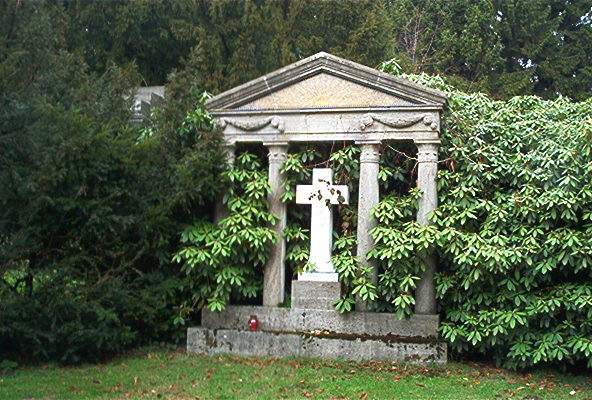
- Burial site at Ohlsdorf cemetery
- Interactive map of Ohlsdorfer Friedhof; Ohlsdorf cemetery

Details
- Established: 1877
- Location: Ohlsdorf, Hamburg, Germany
- Coordinates: 53°37′29″N 10°3′42″E
- Type: Public
- Size: 391 hectares (966 acres)
- No. of graves: 280,000+
- No. of interments: 1.5 million
- Website: Official website

Ohlsdorf Cemetery (German: Ohlsdorfer Friedhof or (former) Hauptfriedhof Ohlsdorf) in the Ohlsdorf quarter of the city of Hamburg, Germany, is the biggest rural cemetery in the world. Most of the people buried at the cemetery are civilians, but there is also a large number of victims of war from various nations. The cemetery notably includes the Old Hamburg Memorial Cemetery (Althamburgischer Gedächtnisfriedhof, formerly Ehrenfriedhof) with the graves of many notable Hamburg citizens.

== History and description ==
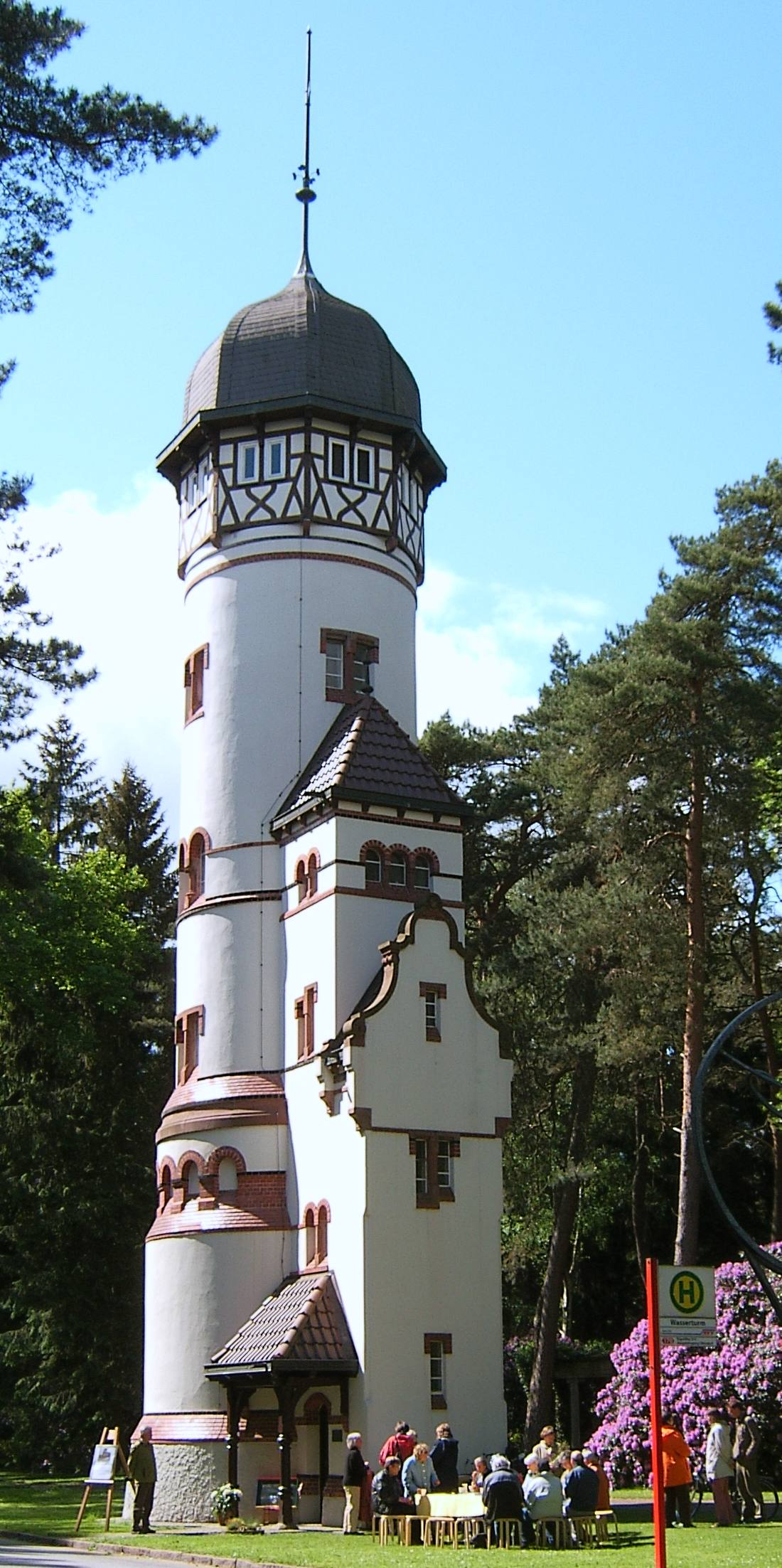
Water tower of the Ohlsdorf cemetery (with a bus stop)

In 1877 the Ohlsdorf Cemetery was established as a non-denominational and multi-regional burial site outside of Hamburg.

The cemetery has an area of 391 hectares (966 acres) with 12 chapels, over 1.5 million burials in more than 280,000 burial sites and streets with a length of 17 km (11 mi). There are 4 entrances for vehicles and public transport is provided with 25 bus stops of two bus lines of the Hamburger Verkehrsverbund. The cemetery is not only used as a burial ground, but also as a recreational area and tourist attraction. With its impressive mausoleums, rhododendron bushes, its ponds and birds, sculptures and funerary museum, about two million people from all over the world visit the cemetery every year.

About 40% of all burials in Hamburg take place in Ohlsdorf Cemetery; in 2002 there were 1600 interments and 4300 urn burials. Two hundred thirty gardeners take care of graves and all facilities.

== Hamburg Commonwealth War Graves Commission Cemetery ==
One of four permanent Commonwealth cemeteries in Germany, the Hamburg Commonwealth War Graves Commission Cemetery is located near chapel 12 (Kapelle 12) of the Ohlsdorf Cemetery.

During World War I over 400 Allied prisoners-of-war who died in German captivity were buried here, as well as sailors whose bodies had been washed ashore on the Frisian Islands. In 1923 the remains of British Commonwealth servicemen from 120 burial grounds in north-western Germany were brought to Hamburg. Further deceased Commonwealth soldiers of World War II and of the post-war period were buried here too.

== Memorials for the victims of Nazism ==
There are six memorial sites for the victims of the Nazi era, the "Monument for the Victims of Nazi Persecution" (Gedenkstätte für die Opfer nationalsozialistischer Verfolgung); the monument, "Passage over the River Styx" (Fahrt über den Styx) for the victims of the Hamburg firestorm; the "Memorial Grove for the Hamburg Resistance Fighters", which includes a memorial erected on the initiative of the Sophie Scholl Foundation, the "Ehrenfeld Hamburg Resistance Fighters"; the "Cemetery for Foreign Victims", erected in 1977 to honor the victims of Nazi concentration camps and forced labor; and the Erinnerungsspirale ("memory spiral") erected in 2001 in the "Garden of Women", as a memorial for the female victims and opponents of the Nazi regime. An additional memorial site was erected in 1951 at the nearby Jewish cemetery, Ilandkoppel, the "Monument for the Murdered Hamburg Jews".

=== Memorial for the victims of Nazi persecution ===
The "Monument for the Victims of Nazi Persecution" lies across from the "new crematorium". Erected in 1949, it has a stele with a marble slab lying in front, engraved with the names of 25 concentration camps. The adjacent graveyard has 105 above-ground urns and 29 buried ones containing the ashes of victims and German concentration camp soil. This memorial evolved from what was established there during a week-long remembrance in November 1945.

=== Monument for the victims of the Hamburg firestorm ===
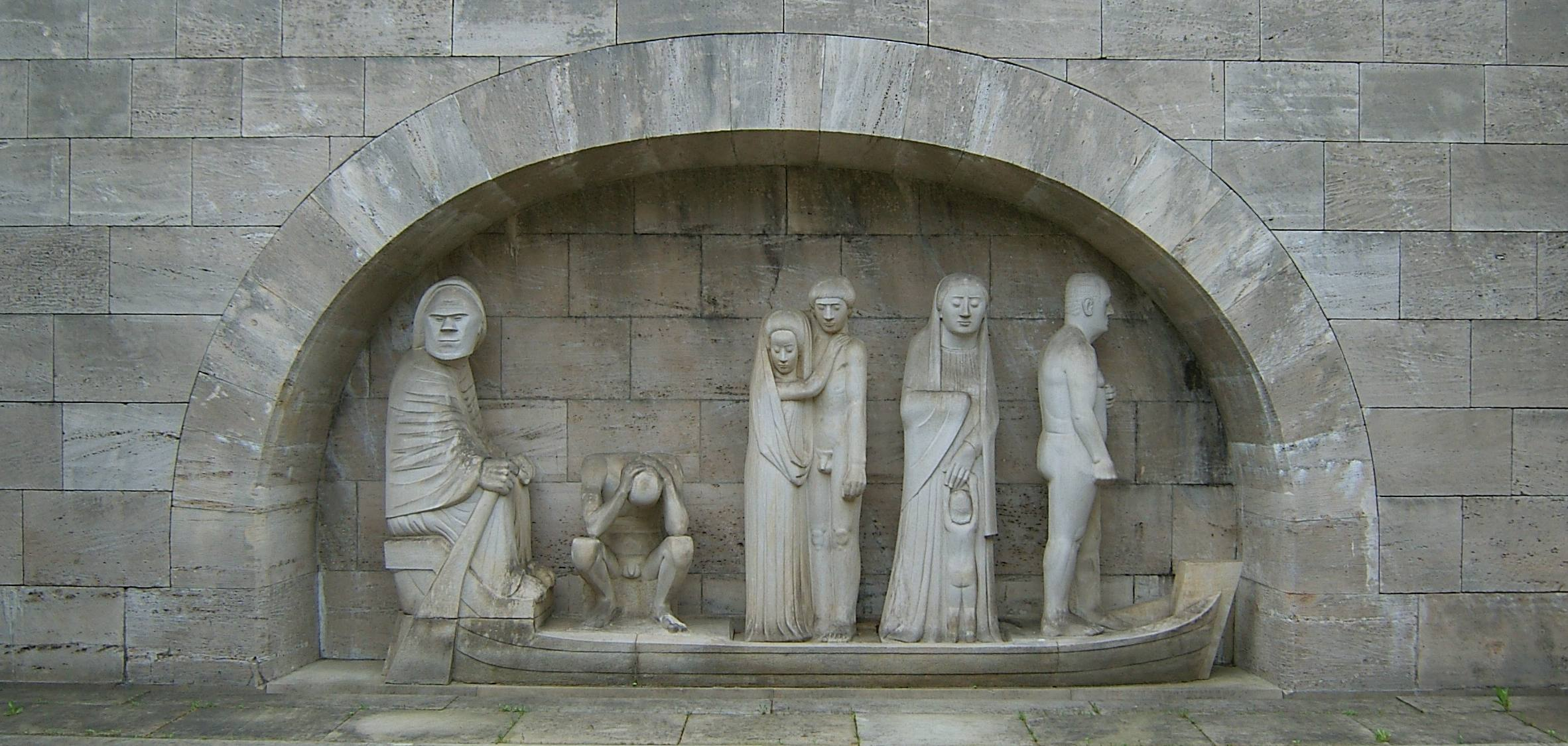
"Ride over the River Styx"

The remains of some 38,000 victims of Operation Gomorrah, the bombing campaign that took place from July 24 to August 3, 1943, lie in a cross-shaped, landscaped mass grave. In 1952, a monument by Gerhard Marcks called "Passage over the River Styx" was erected in the middle of the site.

=== Memorial grove for the Hamburg Resistance fighters ===
To the right of the main entrance on Bergstraße, is the memorial grove for the Resistance fighters from Hamburg, 1933–1945. Located here since September 8, 1946, this memorial is the burial site for 55 anti-fascists who were either executed by the Nazis or died in custody. A bronze sculpture, created in 1953 by Hamburg sculptor Richard Steffen (1903–1964), stands at the entrance to the grove. A stone wall borders the grove, on which are the words of the Czech Resistance fighter and journalist, Julius Fučík, executed in 1943, "Mankind, we loved you – be vigilant".

== Cemetery museum ==
Individuals with a strong interest in preserving the Ohlsdorf cemetery formed the Förderkreis Ohlsdorfer Friedhof (Society for the Promotion of the Ohlsdorf Cemetery), and opened the Museum Friedhof Ohlsdorf (Museum of the Ohlsdorf Cemetery). The museum is dedicated to raising public interest for the Ohlsdorf cemetery, and for promoting historical and contemporary funeral culture. The collection in the museum, on display since 1996, focuses mainly on the history of Hamburg's cemetery culture. Since the Ohlsdorfer cemetery was opened in 1877 as the first American-style park cemetery in Germany, it is of significant importance to the European cemetery culture. The museum has old maps and tools, as well as urns and some of the cemetery's oldest tombstones.

== Notable burial sites ==
Part of the cemetery are three plots of the Commonwealth War Graves Commission (CWGC), which were used as burial sites for British Commonwealth and Allied servicemen of both World Wars. There are more than 2473 identified casualties commemorated by the CWGC.

=== Notable burials ===
Notable people buried at Ohlsdorf include the following:

- Anny Ahlers (1907–1933), opera singer
- Hans Albers (1891–1960), actor
- Wilhelm Amsinck (1752–1831), mayor of Hamburg
- Albert Ballin (1857–1918), German shipping magnate
- Monica Bleibtreu (1944–2009), Austrian born actress
- Hermann Blohm (1848–1930), German shipbuilder
- Hertha Borchert (1895–1985), actress
- Wolfgang Borchert (1921–1947), author and playwright
- Hans von Bülow (1830–1894), conductor, pianist and composer
- C. W. Ceram (1915–1972), journalist and author
- Wilhelm Cuno (1876–1933), German chancellor
- Ida Ehre (1900–1989), actress
- Neville Elliott-Cooper (1889–1918), World War I recipient of the Victoria Cross
- Heinz Erhardt (1909–1979), actor and comedian
- Renate Ewert (1936–1966), actress
- Jan Fedder (1955–2019), actor
- Willy Fritsch (1901–1973), silent-film era actor
- Helmut Griem (1932–2004), actor
- Gustaf Gründgens (1899–1963), actor
- Carl Hagenbeck (1844–1913), merchant of wild animals and inventor of the modern zoo
- Albert Hehn (1908–1983), actor
- Gustav Hertz (1887–1975), physicist and Nobel Prize winner
- Heinrich Hertz (1857–1894), physicist
- Michael Jary (1906–1988), composer
- Carlo Karges (1951–2002), songwriter and guitarist
- Wolfgang Kieling (1924–1985), actor
- Christian Graf von Krockow (1927–2002), writer and political scientist
- Richard Kuöhl (1880–1961), sculptor
- James Last (1929–2015), composer and big band leader
- Alfred Lichtwark (1852–1914), art historian, museum curator, and art educator
- Hanns Lothar (1929–1967), film actor
- Felix von Luckner (1881–1966), navy officer and author
- Lev Lunts 1901–1924), Russian born Jewish writer
- Willy Maertens (1893–1967), actor and stage director
- Harry Meyen (1924–1979), film actor
- Inge Meysel (1910–2004), actress
- Johann Georg Mönckeberg (1839–1908), mayor
- Emil Naucke (1855–1900), strong man, circus and burlesque performer
- Domenica Niehoff (1945–2009), prostitute and activist
- Richard Ohnsorg (1876–1947), stage director
- Marie Priess (1885–1983), resistance fighter
- Kurt Raab (1941–1988), actor, screenwriter and playwright

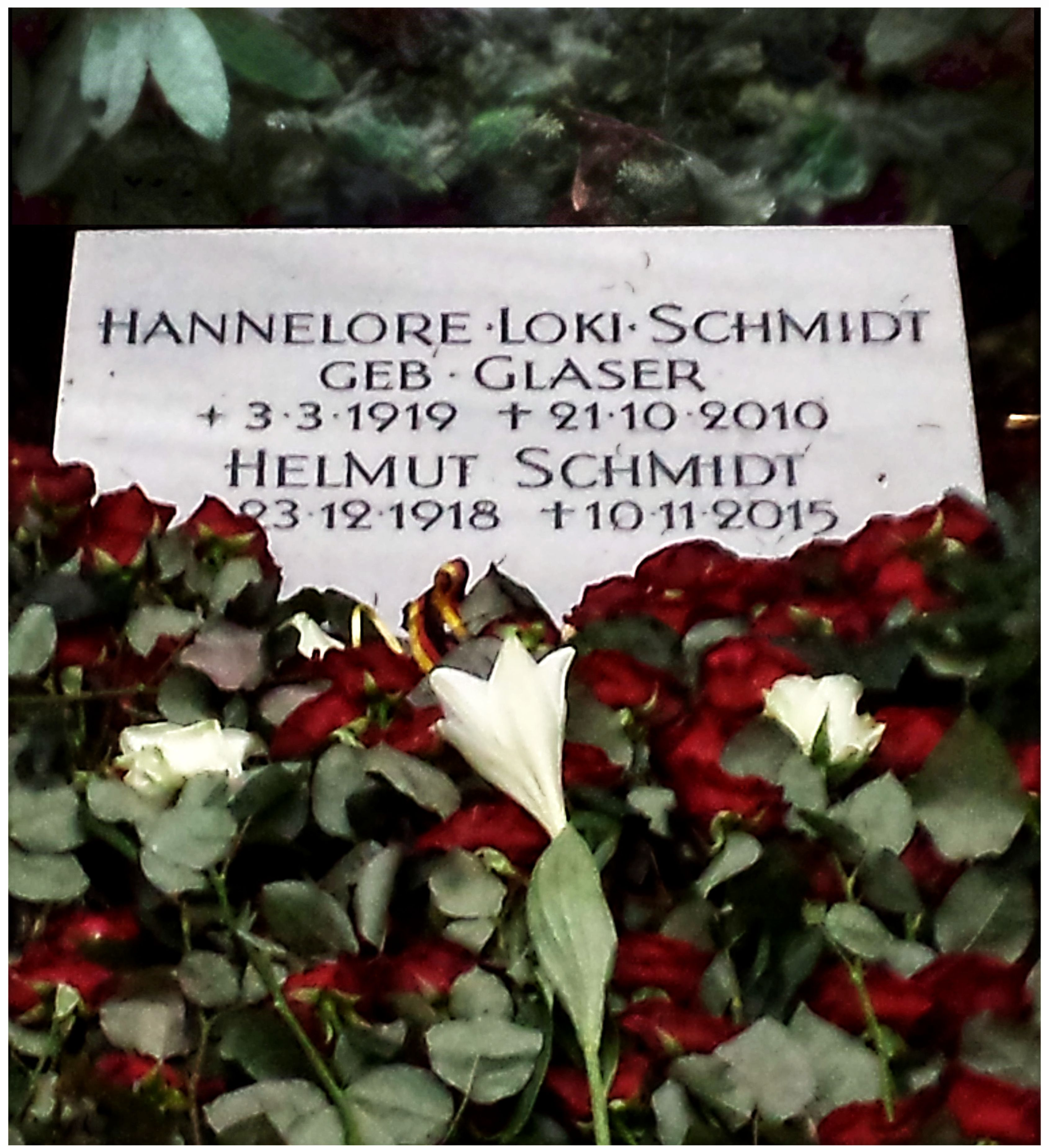
Loki and Helmut Schmidt gravestone

- Norbert Rohringer (1927–2009), Austrian child actor
- Philipp Otto Runge (1777–1810), painter
- Helmut Schmidt (1918–2015), senator, minister, between 1974 and 1982 chancellor of West Germany, since 1983 publisher of Die Zeit
- Loki Schmidt (1919–2010), wife of former chancellor Helmut Schmidt
- Fritz Schumacher (1869–1947), architect
- Kurt Sieveking (1897–1986), mayor of Hamburg
- Henry Vahl (1897–1977), actor
- Werner Veigel (1928–1995), television journalist
- Ernst Voss (1842–1920), German shipbuilder
- James Allen Ward (1919–1941), New Zealand airman and Victoria Cross recipient
- Herbert Weichmann (1896–1983), first mayor of Hamburg
- Hilde Weissner (1909–1987), actress
- Lawrence Winters (1915–1965), opera singer
- Carolin Wosnitza (1987–2011), pornographic actress
- Helmut Zacharias (1920–2002), violinist

== See also ==
- Ohlsdorf Jewish Cemetery, nearby Jüdischer Friedhof Ilandkoppel
